= Tribalistas (2002 album) =

Studio album by Tribalistas

Studio album by Tribalistas
- Released: 4 November 2002
- Recorded: 8—24 April 2002 (Gávea, Rio de Janeiro)
- Genres: Pop; samba; bossa nova; tropicália
- Length: 61:01
- Labels: Phonomotor · EMI Brazil (Brazil); Metro Blue · Capitol (US)
- Producers: Marisa Monte, Arnaldo Antunes (co-prod.), Carlinhos Brown (co-prod.), Alê Siqueira (co-prod.)

Tribalistas chronology
Tribalistas (2002)	Tribalistas (2017)

Singles from Tribalistas
- 1. "Já Sei Namorar" Released: October 28, 2002; 2. "Velha Infância" Released: March 26, 2003

Tribalistas (pronounced [tɾibaˈlistɐs], lit. 'Tribalists') is the debut studio album by the Brazilian musical supergroup Tribalistas, released on 4 November 2002, on the independent record label Phonomotor, distributed by EMI. Brazilian musicians Arnaldo Antunes, Carlinhos Brown, and Marisa Monte were personal friends and had regularly attended one another's performances. In 2001, Monte was invited to contribute vocals to one of the tracks on Antunes' fifth studio album, Paradeiro, which Brown was producing in Salvador, Bahia. The visit, which was scheduled to last just two days, ended up lasting a week. During this time, they composed 13 songs at once and, after discussing what to do with the songs, they decided to record them together. The project was recorded between 8–24 April 2002, in the studio designed in Monte's house in Rio de Janeiro, under the musical production of the singer herself, with the help of Antunes, Brown, and musician Alê Siqueira.

During the development of Tribalistas, the trio decided to incorporate different musical genres into their composition, such as pop, samba, bossa nova, and 1970s tropicália. The trio's use of tropicália was suggested by the media as an attempt to emulate the sound of Novos Baianos, just as the concept of a supergroup was compared to the formation of Doces Bárbaros. Lyrically, it explores disparate themes, such as love relationships, and the Brazilian Carnival. As well as composing all the songs, the performers provided a variety of instruments for the work, with Dadi Carvalho and Cézar Mendes being the only two other musicians credited on its instrumentation. Singer Margareth Menezes, for her part, contributes vocals and guitar to one track, to which she was invited to contribute after visiting the Tribalistas in the studio.

After its release, Tribalistas was met with generally positive reviews from critics, with the majority praising the cohesive union between the disparate styles of the three performers and their vocals. Many singled out Monte's vocals for praise, though others said that her excessive participation made it sound like one of her solo works. The album received five nominations at the 4th Annual Latin Grammy Awards, winning Best Contemporary Pop Album in Portuguese. It was also well received commercially; in Brazil, it topped the album sales charts published by IstoÉ Gente magazine for several weeks, 23 of which were consecutive. Internationally, it was also well received, reaching number one in Portugal, number two in Italy, and the top 100 in France, Spain and Switzerland. The album received a diamond certification issued by Pro-Música Brasil (PMB) and a platinum certification awarded by from the Portuguese Phonographic Association (AFP), among other associations. Worldwide, it has sold more than 3 million units.

Two singles were released by Tribalistas. The first, "Já Sei Namorar", entered the charts in several countries, such as Italy, the Netherlands and Portugal, and received a gold certificate from the Federazione Industria Musicale Italiana (FIMI) for sales of 100,000 units in Italy. "Velha Infância", the second track on the album, also achieved commercial success and became the most played song of the 2000s. The trio undertook minimal promotion for the album, giving only a few interviews with media outlets and performances at the Latin Grammy ceremony in Miami and at the Verona Arena amphitheater in Verona, Italy. A video version of the work, containing behind-the-scenes footage of its production and recording, was shown by TV Globo.

== Background ==
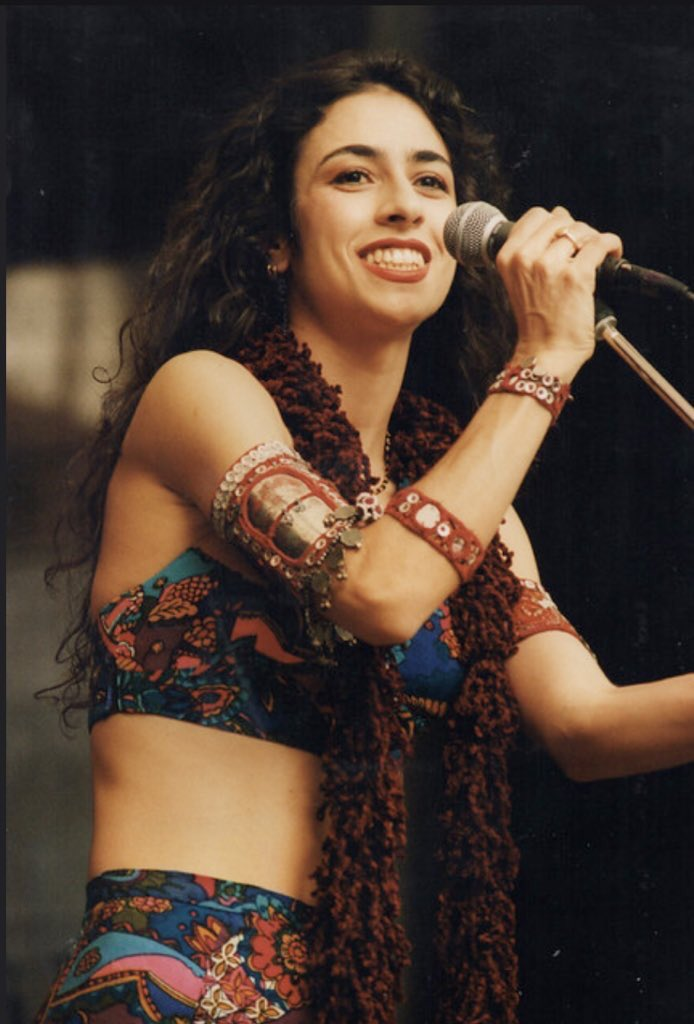
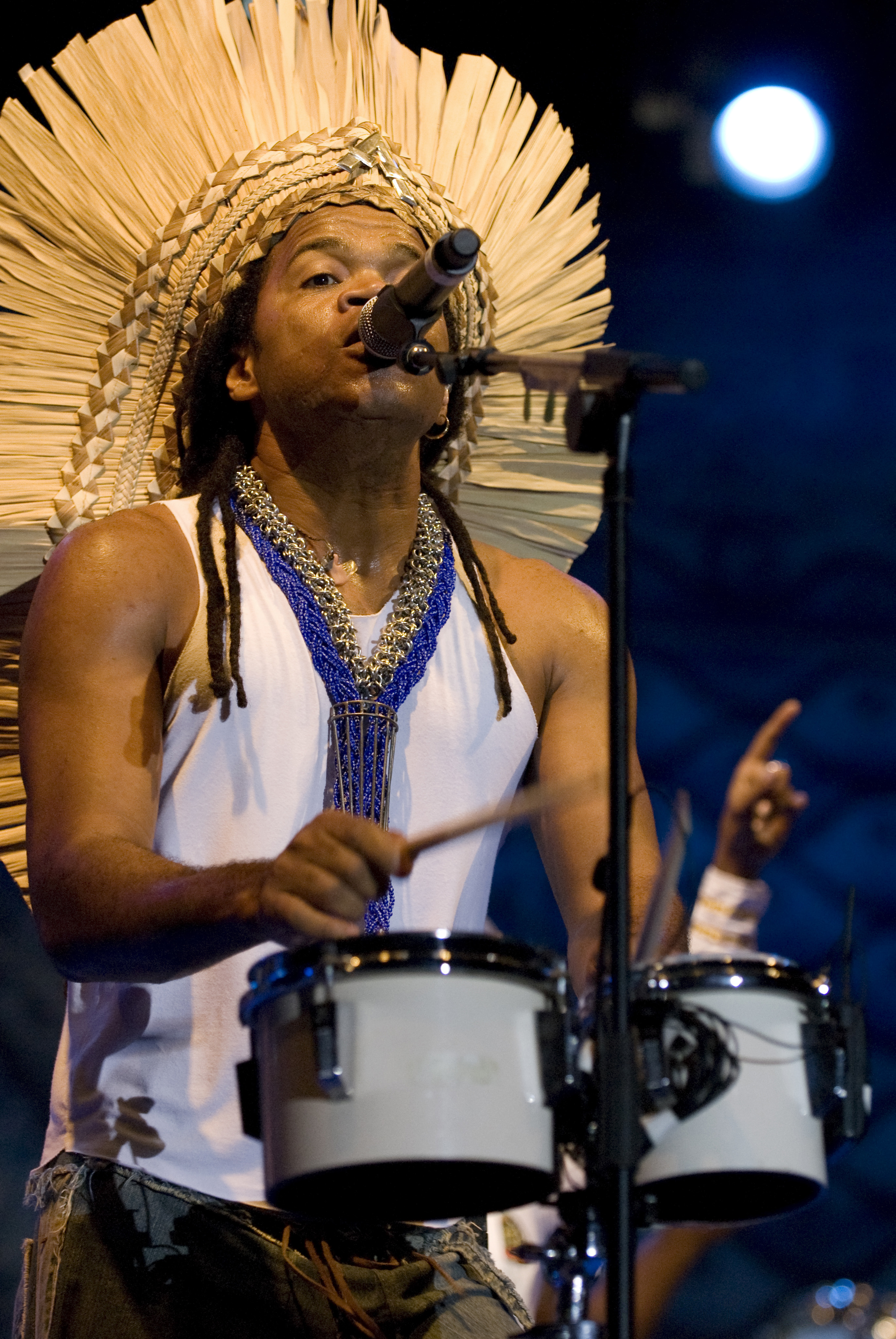
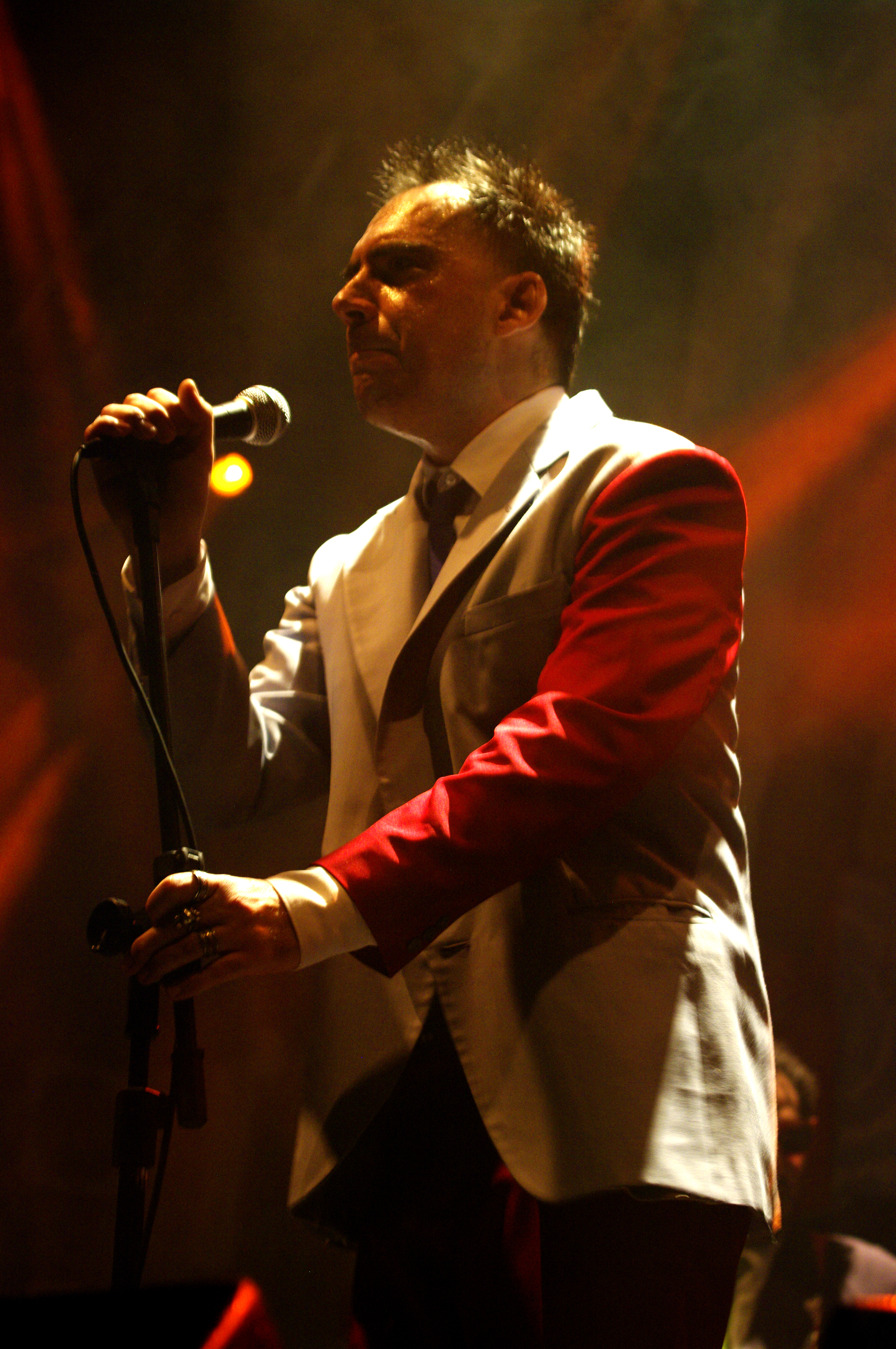
The musicians Marisa Monte (left), Carlinhos Brown (center) e Arnaldo Antunes (right) came together to integrate and develop the album.

Brazilian musicians Arnaldo Antunes, Carlinhos Brown and Marisa Monte have collaborated relatively frequently on each other's work since the beginning of their careers. The first contribution came on Monte's debut album, Mais (1990), which was preceded by the single "Beija Eu", co-composed by Antunes. Her partnership with Brown began in 1994, when he was invited to collaborate on her next album, Verde, Anil, Amarelo, Cor de Rosa e Carvão. From then on, the two also began a close friendship. Brown even described her as his "spiritual sister" years later. Monte's relationship with Antunes came shortly afterwards, when the three of them wrote and produced tracks for Monte's double album, Barulhinho Bom (1996). She was co-producer of Brown's second studio album, Omelete Man, which featured compositions by Antunes, who subsequently added lyrics written by Brown to his project Um Som (1998).

In 2000, Monte released his next album Memórias, Crônicas, e Declarações de Amor. The Brown song "Amor I Love You" became the project's first single and the driving force behind its sales, which exceeded 1 million units in Brazil and earned it a diamond certification from Pro-Música Brasil (PMB). It also earned Monte a nomination for Best Brazilian Song at the 2nd Latin Grammy ceremony. During the recording of the song, Antunes participated by reciting an excerpt from the book Cousin Bazilio (1978), written by the Portuguese diplomat Eça de Queiroz.

== Recording and production ==
"We had never gotten together to compose such a large volume of songs in a few days, as we did in Salvador. Now, somehow, we've been composing things for many years, either me and Carlinhos, or me and Marisa, or Carlinhos and Marisa, or the three of us together. This has been happening with a certain frequency, even though we live in different cities. And I think there's a question of language affinity, which is rare. I compose with many people, I have many partners. And no one is as fluent"

— Antunes explaining the collaboration with Brown and Monte to create Tribalistas.

In March 2001, Antunes recruited Brown and the musician Alê Siqueira to produce his fifth studio album, Paradeiro. The production and composition sessions began shortly after at the Ilha dos Sapos studio, located in the Candeal neighborhood of Salvador, Bahia. Shortly after, they invited Monte to the location for a special guest appearance, contributing vocals to the title track of this album, which she also co-wrote. The recording was quick, but the singer ended up staying with them for an entire week, thus collaborating with Antunes and Brown on the creation of new compositions. In a conversation with Nelson Motta, Monte detailed how the process emerged: "We didn't meet to compose an album. I went to record with Arnaldo, then I knew I would spend a few days with him, I brought some things from here, he had some ideas there, and naturally, when the three of us got together, these songs started to be made and finished".

Monte brought to the studio a demo tape containing drafts of lyrics that she had previously started working on alone or something she had begun creating with Brown on another occasion but had not had the opportunity to finish. She explained: "Sometimes something Brown and I had started, we would finish with Arnaldo; sometimes something I brought from earlier; sometimes something they had started, and I added some detail". She also mentioned that the creative process took place every night, "and each night we would make two more [songs] and sing the ones that had been made the day before". During the process, the trio received a visit from Margareth Menezes. According to them, the singer visited the studio on more than one occasion, spending the entire day watching them compose and play the pieces they were creating, which motivated them to involve her in some of them. By the end of that week, Antunes, Brown, and Monte had written about 20 songs together, three of which were developed with additional contributions from other collaborators such as Menezes, Davi Moraes, Cezar Mendes, and Pedro Baby.

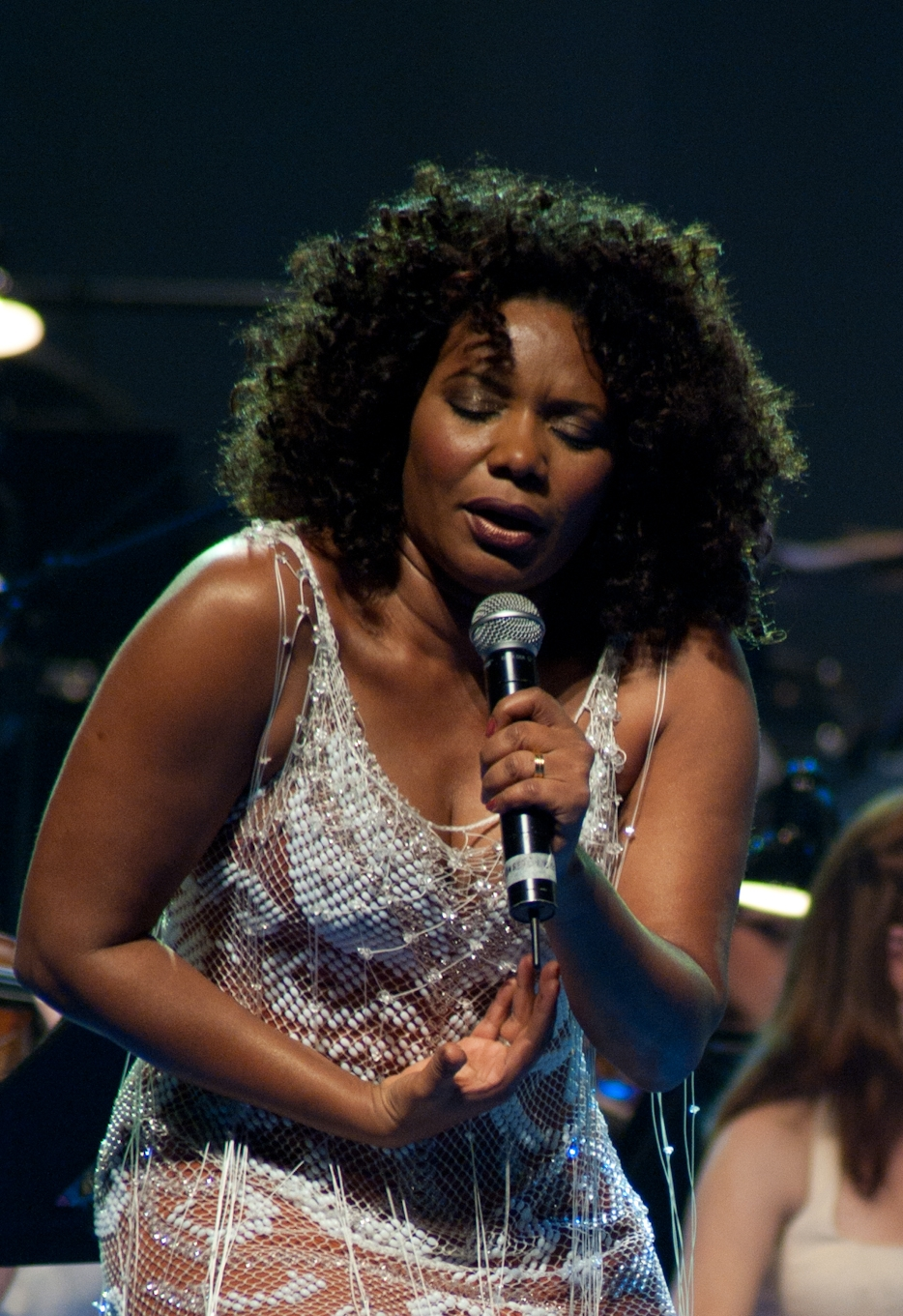
Singer Margareth Menezes participates in the vocals and guitar of "Passe em Casa", being invited to contribute after visiting the Tribalistas in the studio

Subsequently, the three resumed their individual career commitments; Monte continued the tour supporting Memórias, Crônicas, e Declarações de Amor (2000), which was recorded in audiovisual format and released later that year. Antunes released Paradeiro in October and began a tour to promote it. Brown dedicated himself to producing albums for Timbalada and Menezes. However, through phone calls and occasional meetings, they continued refining the compositions, and after discussing what to do with each one, they agreed to record them together. In April 2002, during a time when each member had fewer professional obligations, they decided to finally bring the project to fruition. The artists gathered at Monte's personal studio, located in her house in the Gávea neighborhood of Rio de Janeiro, on the 8th of that month. With just two days of rehearsal, the recordings lasted until the 24th, totaling 13 days, with one track recorded each day.

In the studio, only two other musicians were present, Dadi Carvalho and Cézar Mendes, who contributed by playing various instruments, along with Menezes, who provided vocals, composition, and guitar on the track where she is credited. Monte emerged as the focal point of the group by solely taking on the role of producer, while Brown, Antunes, and collaborator Siqueira were credited as co-producers. According to her manager Leonardo Netto, the artist's intention was not to monopolize the spotlight but rather to act as the "catalyst for the realization of this project". The months of May and June were dedicated to the completion and mixing by Monte, Siqueira, and Flávio de Souza. Initially thinking only about having enough material to promote the work, the production company Trattoria Di Frame Produções was contacted to film the recording of the project. Cinematographer Guilherme Ramalho, together with director Dora Jobim, set up a structure with three mini-DV cameras to capture the entire process in the studio. Five months were spent editing and completing the footage, including the producers' return to the studio for audio mixing in Dolby 5.1.

== Musical style ==
=== Themes and influence on composition ===
It all started with the guitars, the arrangements came from us playing and singing the songs at the time of composition. And we thought, that's cool. That's not far off what the record should be. So that's what guided the creation of the arrangements, we let them spring from the beginning of the compositions, which were the voices and the guitars.

— Tribalistas about the process of designing the work’s arrangements.

Musically, Tribalistas is an album composed of different styles, such as pop, samba, bossa nova, and tropicália of the 1970s. The inclusion of the latter genre was suggested by the media as an attempt to emulate the sound of Novos Baianos, while the supergroup concept drew comparisons to the formation of Doces Bárbaros. Although no direct influences were revealed during the creation of the album, Antunes mentioned Gil & Jorge: Ogum, Xangô (1975), Elis & Tom (1974), Doces Bárbaros (1976), and Refestança (1977) as examples of "albums that were made collaboratively, where artists created something they wouldn't have done alone". Analyzing each member's contribution, Marco Antônio Barbosa, from the website CliqueMusic, wrote: "If we were to define the percentages of each in the final sum, it could be said that the album is 65% Monte—phase Verde, Anil, Amarelo, Cor de Rosa e Carvão (1994)—, 25% Brown, and 10% Arnaldo. Direct, captivating melodies—pop, essentially—define the album, especially when Marisa takes the lead". Similarly, Matt Cibula, from PopMatters, felt the album displays the combination of Monte's pop style, Brown's Afro-inspired approach, and Antunes' experimentalism, resulting in what he described as a ménage à trois of Brazil's three musical centers and three major music trends. Mauro Ferreira, from the magazine Istoé Gente, noted that "the project balances Arnaldo's concrete poetry with Marisa's refined pop and Brown's rhythmic experimentation".

To support the songs, Tribalistas also showcases diversity by incorporating various instruments such as guitars, strings, bass, drums, keyboards, harpsichord, and minimalist percussion—including the use of a pestle—resulting in a predominantly acoustic sound filled with acoustic guitar that permeates most of its content. Jon Lusk, from BBC News, echoed this sentiment, emphasizing that while the album's sound features distinct elements like music box, berimbau, and glockenspiel, it never overdoes the mix or allows these experiments to feel confusing. The lyrical content covers diverse themes, such as romantic relationships, the Carnival in Brazil, and playful concepts like the guardian angel and the Nativity of Jesus.

=== Content and musical structure ===
The album opens with a warm greeting, "bom dia, comunidade", (lit. 'good morning, community') in "Carnavália", its first track. Lyrically, it is a celebration of the spirit and joy of Brazilian Carnival. The lyrics convey the excitement and festivity of this annual event, inviting listeners to join the celebration. Musically, it blends elements of samba with tropicália, featuring an arrangement characterized by guitar work, keyboard, and percussion performed by Brown. The second track, "Um A Um", is a moderately paced song about the desire for a deep and intimate connection between two individuals. The lyrics express a longing to be close to someone without losing oneself, emphasizing the significance of one-on-one connection. Next is "Velha Infância", a pop ballad that describes the intense longing felt for a loved one when they are not around. The chorus counters this with a joyful celebration of the relationship, expressing feelings of love, happiness, and security shared by the two lovers. The repeated phrase "eu gosto de você" ('I like you') reinforces the sentiment of deep affection. The song suggests that the relationship is so fulfilling because it evokes a return to a time when life was simpler—childhood. The fourth track, "Passe Em Casa", features a special guest appearance by Margareth Menezes. Musically, it is a pop song with hip-hop influences, centered around themes of longing and anticipation for someone's presence. The lyrics reflect impatience and desperation for a visit, emphasizing the emotional impact this has on the person waiting. The repetition of the phrase "passe em casa" ('drop by') in the chorus acts as a plea, expressing the desire to be visited and to spend time together, reflecting the yearning for companionship and relief from loneliness and monotony. In this track, the harmonized vocals of Menezes and the Tribalistas are accompanied by a harmonica and electronic effects, with the sound of a motorcycle growling at its conclusion.

I think the lyrics of "Tribalistas" speak of something that is very clear, which is to exchange this thing of certainties, dogmas, institutions, God, for the daily joy of living in communion, hence this idea of tribe. No certainty, judgment, religion, none of that, just the joy of doing things together.

— Antunes explaining the meaning of the title track of "Tribalistas".

"O Amor É Feio" is a slow-paced track that deconstructs traditional notions of beauty typically associated with love songs, evident in lines like: "O amor é sujo / Tem cheiro de mijo / Ele mete medo / Vou lhe tirar disso" ('Love is dirty / It smells like piss / It scares me / I'll take you out of it'). "É Você", the sixth track, is a ballad derived from tropicália, with its melodic appeal being compared by critics to Brown's song "Hawaii e You" (1998). It speaks about a deep connection and devotion between two people. The lyrics convey a sense of exclusivity and intimacy, suggesting that the singer's world revolves around this particular person. "Carnalismo" is musically a blend of waltz and modinha, similar to those developed in the early 20th century. With instrumentation including guitars, piano, and an accordion played by Dadi Carvalho, the track features the sounds of rain and extracts lines such as "me abraça e me faz calor" and "segredos de liquidificador" ('embrace me and make me warm' and 'blender secrets') from the song "Codinome Beija-Flor" (1985), performed by Cazuza. Lyrically, it celebrates the physical and sensual aspects of love and desire, focusing on the strong attraction and connection between two people.

"Mary Cristo" is a simple and playful Christmas carol, with its title being a pun on the English phrase "Merry Christmas". The following track is "Anjo da Guarda". Starting with the voice of a child, its lyrics seem to convey a message of protection, perseverance, and finding beauty in everyday life, creating a contrast between the darkness of night and the brightness of morning, highlighting the role of the guardian angel. "Lá de Longe" is a lullaby; in it, the Tribalistas sing about the beauty of a world hidden in a distant place. Its arrangements, almost acoustic, are rich in guitars and pianos, played by the trio along with Dadi and Cezar Mendez. The eleventh track, "Pecado É Lhe Deixar de Molho", is a bossa nova ballad primarily sung by Monte, exploring themes of love, patience, and forgiveness. The lyrics carry a sense of devotion and reverence toward the relationship in question. "Já Sei Namorar" has a sound inspired by pop and references being independent and living life on one's own terms. The lyrics emphasize that one should not rely on television or solitude to satisfy their needs but instead find joy in the world around them and embrace the notion that everyone is there to give love and be loved. The album closes with the eponymous title track "Tribalistas", which, under the sound of tropicália, reflects on the future of the supergroup. They express that they have no grand ambitions and that their time together will end at that moment, stating: "O tribalismo é um antimovimento / Que vai se desintegrar no próximo momento / O tribalismo pode ser e deve ser o que você quiser / Não tem que fazer nada basta ser o que se é" ('Tribalism is an anti-movement / That will disintegrate in the next moment / Tribalism can be and should be what you want / You don't have to do anything, just be who you are').

== Title, release and cover ==
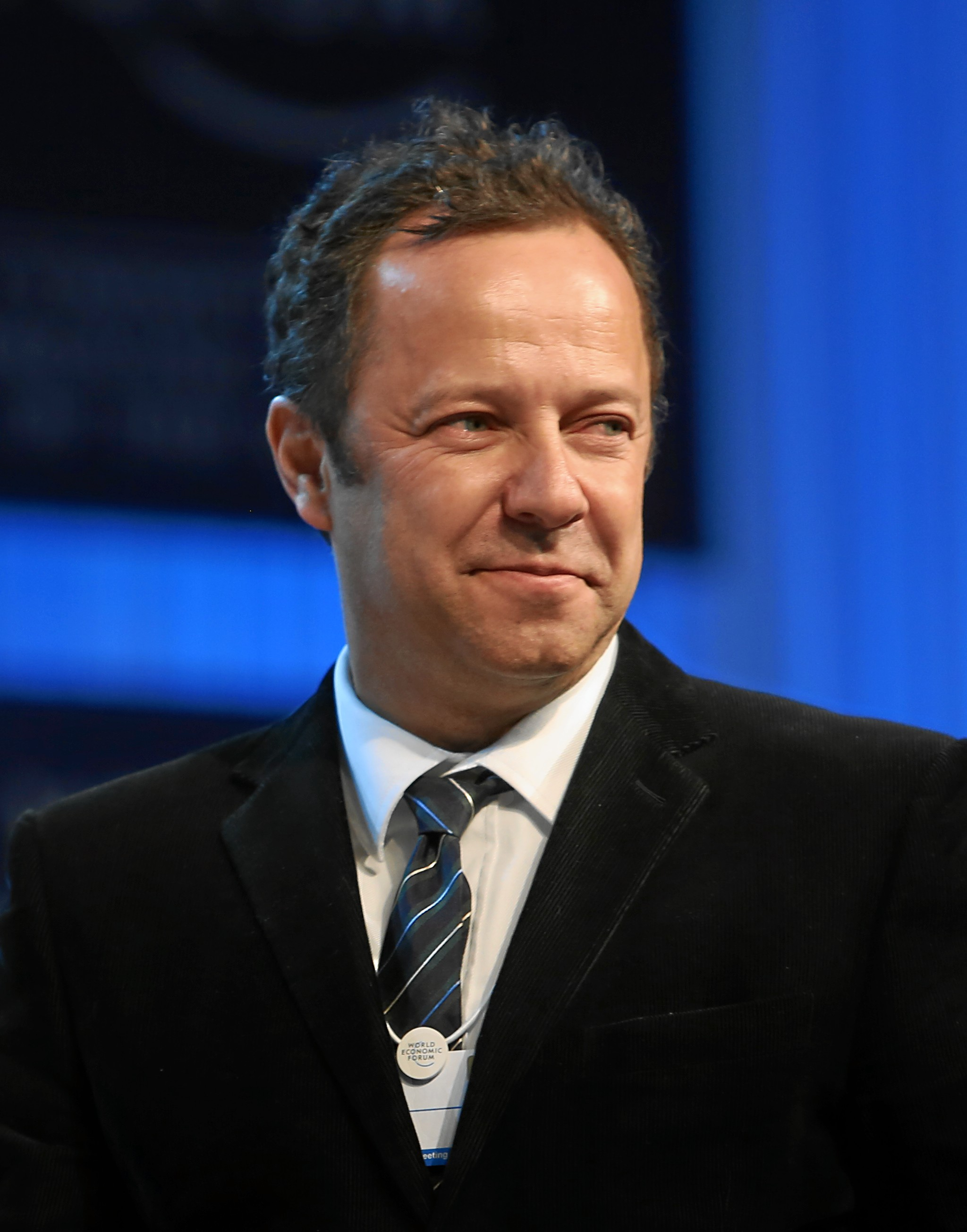
Brazilian-American plastic artist Vik Muniz designed the cover art for Tribalistas

In mid-October 2002, Tribalistas announced that their album would be released a few days later, on 4 November, through Phonomotor Records—an independent record label owned by Monte—with distribution by EMI Brazil. Since Antunes had an active recording contract with BMG at the time, it was necessary to negotiate his authorization and license with the label's executives, who kindly granted permission. Brown, in turn, also needed authorization from BMG, but from the Spanish branch of the company, through which he had signed and would later release his fourth studio album, Carlinhos Brown é Carlito Marrón (2003). In addition to the CD, the album was released in VHS and DVD formats, with the latter documenting the entire writing and recording process of the work. A month after its release, the DVD version was shown in some movie theaters in shopping centers in Rio de Janeiro and São Paulo, through a partnership with Rede UCI Cinemas, making EMI the first record label to use this method for an album release in Brazil. All three editions were released in the United States on 17 December, in Europe on 11 March 2003, while in countries like Argentina, it was not released until 3 February, and in Mexico on 3 March. In total, the album was made available in over 40 countries. In May 2018, to celebrate the trio's reunion tour, Tribalistas was reissued on vinyl by Universal Music.

Additionally, 5,000 copies of a song book containing sheet music for all the album's songs, as well as details of the recording process for each, were published by Gryphus Editora on 3 September 2003, in Brazil, and simultaneously in the United States, Spain, and Latin America. The artwork for the album cover, created by visual artist Vik Muniz, features an illustration of the Tribalistas made with chocolate syrup. Originally, the artist had envisioned an image where the members were drawn with strings of musical instruments, but when the image was reduced to CD cover size, Muniz felt that the lines lost their original meaning, so he decided to use accessible food items, such as chocolate and sugar. The album's title and supergroup's name Tribalistas (lit. 'tribalists') derive from the numeral prefix tri-, which represents both the three members and the concept of a tribe. Brown elaborated, stating that the name came after they reviewed several words in a Portuguese dictionary: "Triangle, triphasic, tridimensional, trilogy [...] until we saw the adjective 'tribal' next to it and it immediately occurred to us, we are Tribalistas! I was a bit hesitant about the name, because it was strongly associated with my image as the Timbalada guy and the many percussion instruments, but Marisa and Arnaldo voted against me".

== Promotion ==
To promote Tribalistas, a low-key promotional strategy was opted. The members limited their public engagement to a handful of interviews with select media outlets and eschewed concerts or television appearances. According to Monte, this decision had already been prearranged by the trio before the project's release and would not be reversed regardless of its commercial outcome. In an interview with the Jornal do Brasil, the singer elaborated on the matter: "When we released the album, everyone was very busy with their solo careers. But the only way to do it was at that moment. I know we'll see each other on stage, at each other's shows, but we won't do a tour around the country". The video version of the album was broadcast in full on 3 November 2002, by the Rede Globo, at 12:50 a.m. following Fantástico. An official webpage for the supergroup was launched on 18 November, featuring a contest where fans could win CD or DVD copies of the album by submitting the most creative response to the question: "What did you think about the meeting of Arnaldo Antunes, Carlinhos Brown, and Marisa Monte?" In September 2003, they organized their first press conference at the Hotel Le Lavoisier in Paris, France, where they engaged with journalists from various parts of the world and performed tracks from the album. MTV Brasil was the only Brazilian broadcaster present at the event and aired it as a year-end special on 12 December.

At the 4th Annual Latin Grammy Awards, held on 5 September in Miami, the supergroup performed "Já Sei Namorar" during their first of two televised appearances at the time. Seated on stools at the center of the stage, Monte played the guitar, and Brown took on percussion, with Dadi and Mendes accompanying on guitars. Tatiana Tavares from Tribuna da Imprensa praised their choice to sing in Portuguese rather than re-recording the track in another language, in contrast to Brazilian Alexandre Pires, who performed in Spanish at the same event. Their second and final performance that year took place at the Verona Arena amphitheater in Verona, Italy, in front of an audience exceeding 20,000 people.

== Singles ==
"Já Sei Namorar" was released on 28 October 2002, serving as the first single from Tribalistas. Its commercialization occurred through the release of two CD singles, which were distributed separately in Brazil and several other countries. Commercially, it performed exceptionally well, reaching the top position among the ten most-played songs on radio stations just a few weeks after its release. In retrospect, it was ranked as the 19th most-played song of 2003 in the country, according to Crowley Broadcast Analysis. Across continental Europe, it also achieved success, reaching second place in Portugal, 15th place in the Netherlands, 33rd in Italy, 75th in Switzerland, and 84th in France. It was certified gold by the Federazione Industria Musicale Italiana (FIMI), representing 25,000 copies sold in Italy. According to the defunct Americel telecommunications service, the composition ended the year as the most-purchased on their platforms, combining digital download and cellphone ringtone sales.

The second single of the album, "Velha Infância", was released on 26 March 2003. It became another major success even before its official release, climbing to the top of radio station playlists, like its predecessor. According to Crowley and the Escritório Central de Arrecadação e Distribuição (ECAD), it was the most-played song in the country that year and of the 2000s, respectively. Additionally, it was part of the soundtrack of the telenovela Mulheres Apaixonadas (2003), broadcast by Rede Globo, as the theme for the characters Cláudio (Erik Marmo) and Edwiges (Carolina Dieckmann). The publication Spin also placed the theme in the 41st position on its list of the 50 best songs of 2002. "É Você", although not released as a single, was included in another Rede Globo telenovela, Da Cor do Pecado (2004), in sequences where the characters Moa (Aline Moraes) and Paco (Reynaldo Gianecchini) interacted.

== Reception ==
=== Critical reception ===
Professional ratings
Review scores
Source	Rating
All About Jazz	3.5/5 stars
AllMusic	4.5/5 stars
BBC News	Favorable
CliqueMusic	3/5 stars
Correio Braziliense	3/5 stars
DownBeat	5/5 stars
Folha de S.Paulo	4/5 stars
Istoé Gente	4/5 stars
Tribuna da Imprensa	3/4 stars
Wilson & Alroy's Record Reviews	3.5/5 stars

Tribalistas was met with acclaim from critics, who mostly praised the quality of its songs and the cohesive union between the disparate styles of the three performers. Many praised their vocals, particularly Monte's, while others felt her excessive participation made it sound like one of her solo works. Philip Jandovský, from the database AllMusic, for example, gave it four and a half stars out of five, defining it as a "very good, but simple and unpretentious" album that, although in a different way than many had predicted, meets the expectations created around its release. He also praised the songs for being "direct" and "very appealing", the vocals of Monte and Antunes for blending in an "interesting and quite unusual" way, and the production by Monte and Siqueira, which he considered "tasteful". He also notes that while there are "sporadic special effects" in its production, they sound "elegant" and help make the songs feel "fresh and different". Another database, All About Jazz, gave the work three and a half stars out of five. In a favorable review, the editorial team expressed surprise at the cohesion between the different styles of the artists, stating that what seemed like it would not work miraculously results in "a collection of memorable songs that are in very good taste". They further attributed the quality of the album's songs to the combination of Monte's "buttery smooth" vocals with Antunes's "rough and guttural" ones, considering it similar to the union of "sandpaper with velvet", and also praised Brown's vocals, particularly on "É Você", for revealing "an effective tenor". They conclude by stating that, even though the voices are the centerpiece of Tribalistas and there is nothing experimental or innovative in it, the songs are "interesting" and the album is "consistently warm, inviting, ceaselessly romantic", and "highly recommended".

Awarding three stars out of four, Tatiana Tavares, a journalist for Tribuna da Imprensa, noted that the project manages to sound "simple due to the objectivity of its songs" and "sophisticated because of the uniqueness of its arrangements", also pointing out its ability to create a distinct concept from what each of the performers develops in their individual works. The final result, according to the author, is an album that is "minimalist, focused on the details of each melody, the perfectionist arrangements, and the undeniable quality of well-crafted lyrics and songs that are sure to become a reference". Reviewing for the British portal BBC News, Jon Lusk was favorable to the album in his analysis, which he deemed Monte's best work since Verde, Anil, Amarelo, Cor de Rosa e Carvão (1994). The artist's vocals were considered "the strongest presence" and "the best thing" about the album, also highlighting the arrangements, the contribution of Dadi Carvalho—whom he called the most notable among the supporting musicians—as well as the quality of the songs, stating that they would stay in the listener's memory after multiple listens and "would soon become ingrained". Also considering it similar to Verde, Anil, Amarelo, Cor de Rosa e Carvão, Marco Antonio Barbosa, from CliqueMusic, awarded three and a half stars out of five and opined that the album's "direct" and "appealing" melodies are even more highlighted when Monte "takes the lead" or interacts with Antunes's "strange" performance. While classifying its tracks as "interesting and contradictory" for deviating from the "mythomania created around the trio", Barbosa rejected the expectations surrounding the album as a "modernized reissue of tropicalism", as well as what he suggests to be a "tendency toward pomposity" and a desire to establish a "manifesto" and "cultural landmark" that, in his view, could affect it from receiving an "unbiased listening" and "appreciation without preconceived expectations or notions".

Tribalistas asserts itself as one of the best albums of the year due to the quality of its original repertoire. [...] Although the title suggests a percussive revelry, the album has a delicate and handcrafted atmosphere. The gathering of the three voices results in elegance. In fact, Marisa leads the vocals with her absolute pitch. The tribe is a ten!

— Excerpt from the critical analysis made by music journalist Mauro Ferreira, from the magazine Istoé Gente.

Pedro Alexandre Sanches, writing for Folha de S.Paulo, gave the album four stars out of five and wrote that Monte is able to skillfully transition between the "rationality" of Antunes and the "spontaneity" of Brown, and that, here, the "traces of banal conceptualism" of the former are diluted, freeing the latter from "the embarrassment of conveying his points of view". He concluded the analysis by saying that the album, which he classifies as "sincere" and representative of the artistic personalities of the three, is not one to promote revolutions, since its proposal "is essentially conservative" and attached to the dogmas of the 1960s and 1970s. For editors at Estadão, Monte's voice is "the north and the east" of Tribalistas to the point where it could be called her solo album; the songs were seen as "mannered", "without shocks", "without slopes or hills", and the material was described as an "anti-movement" in a moment when transgressive artists were taking more discreet positions, concluding: "There are historical moments that call for confrontation—and maybe this is one of them?" Fabiano Finco, from the Pioneiro newspaper, described it as "pleasant", while echoing similar thoughts to previous analysts, emphasizing that Monte's contributions overshadow those of the others, making Tribalistas sound like a work that is uniquely hers.

Giving three stars out of five, the website Wilson & Alroy's Record Reviews noted that Tribalistas is so excessively soft that faster tracks like "Carnalismo" end up being overshadowed. "Mary Cristo" and "Já Sei Namorar" are "wonderfully catchy", while "Carnavália" is deemed "the best song Monte has released to date" and concludes that, in vocal terms, she and Brown give their best performances here compared to any of their solo works. The American magazine Billboard published an article in which it classified the album as "infinitely Brazilian", "sophisticated and, yes, accessible enough to become a hit". Reviewing: "From the delicate and almost ethereal 'Anjo da Guarda' and 'Mary Cristo' to the joyful opening track 'Carnavália', Tribalistas is a delight", and the "baritone and deeply low" vocals of Brown and Antunes, when paired with Monte's delicate ones, "work" and prove that the union of "three voices can be better than one", justifying that "each of them can sing well individually and, at the same time, they achieve a cohesive and beautiful whole". Rosualdo Rodrigues expressed less enthusiasm in his Correio Braziliense review, advising listeners not to expect any manifesto in the lyrics of the album, nor anything surprising in it, as, in his view, the artists, in conceiving it, were "seeking more the pleasure provided by the music than conceptual exercises". During the analysis, he praises the trio's synergy and Monte's vocals but expresses that tracks like "É Você" and "Velha Infância" seem like leftovers from her solo album, Memórias, Crônicas, e Declarações de Amor (2000). Meanwhile, Saulo Gomes, from the ZeroZen portal, was extremely negative when reviewing the video version of the work, saying that the songs have a "sleep-inducing" and "awkward" atmosphere and that the overall mood of the CD is "romantic, almost cheesy, and definitely hippie". He further states that "this is an album of Monte as a composer", a role he considers to be "of an extraordinary badness", but that, alongside the "unqualified" partners she chooses to write with, "anyone can come off as a genius".

=== Accolades ===
The critical success of Tribalistas was reflected in numerous entertainment industry awards. In Brazil, the album was named Best Album of 2002 by the São Paulo Art Critics Association (APCA). "Velha Infância" and its performers were nominated for Best Song and Best Musical Group at the 43rd annual edition of Troféu Imprensa, winning the latter. They also received the Best MPB Group award during the 43rd edition of the Prêmio TIM de Música. At the 10th ceremony of the Multishow Brazilian Music Awards, "Já Sei Namorar" was nominated for Best Song and Best Music Video, winning the latter, while Tribalistas, both in its audio and video versions, won Best CD and Best DVD, respectively. At the 2003 MTV Video Music Awards Brazil, the aforementioned song competed in the Audience Choice and Pop Music Video categories, again without success.

Internationally, the trio received two nominations at the Italian Music Awards, winning Best International Revelation of the Year but not Best International Group. They also won the Best Latin Group award at the Premios Ondas. At the 4th ceremony of the Latin Grammy Awards, the supergroup received six nominations; "Já Sei Namorar" competed for Record of the Year and Best Brazilian Song, while the album was nominated in the categories Best Recording Engineering, Album of the Year and Best Brazilian Pop Contemporary Album. They won only the last category, a result that drew attention from the Brazilian press, which had considered them a favorite to win multiple awards that night. In addition, Tribalistas was voted the second-best Brazilian album of 2002 in a Folha de S. Paulo poll of over 9,000 readers, garnering 785 votes. Retrospectively, the newspaper's editors ranked it 10th among the 50 albums that "formed Brazilian musical identity" in the 2000s.

== Commercial performance ==
Commercially, Tribalistas achieved significant success. In Brazil, according to the ranking published by Istoé Gente based on data from Sucesso CD magazine, the album debuted at number two among the ten best-selling albums in the territory—second only to the self-titled album by Rouge—during the week of 13–19 November 2002. It retained this position for six consecutive updates before moving to the top of the chart during the week of 2–7 January 2003. From there, boosted by the heavy rotation of "Já Sei Namorar" on the radio, it remained in first place for an uninterrupted 23 weeks until the week of 28 May–3 June, when the soundtrack for the telenovela Mulheres Apaixonadas displaced it to second place. Selling 500,000 copies within just over a month of release, it garnered media attention for achieving such success during a period of declining CD sales due to piracy and for being promoted without interviews or tours.

It was announced as the best-selling album in Brazil in December 2002, a time when the country's music industry experienced its highest revenues due to Christmas festivities, surpassing Roberto Carlos, traditionally the best-seller during that period. According to a report by Pro-Música Brasil (PMB), Tribalistas closed the year as the fifth best-selling album, despite being released only a month before year's end, leading Jornal do Brasil to call it, alongside Rouge, the "biggest commercial phenomenon" of 2002. The following year, it was the 15th best-seller, with 1 million units sold in Brazil by September. After reaching this milestone, PMB awarded the album a diamond certification. Its total sales in Brazil are estimated to exceed 2.1 million copies.

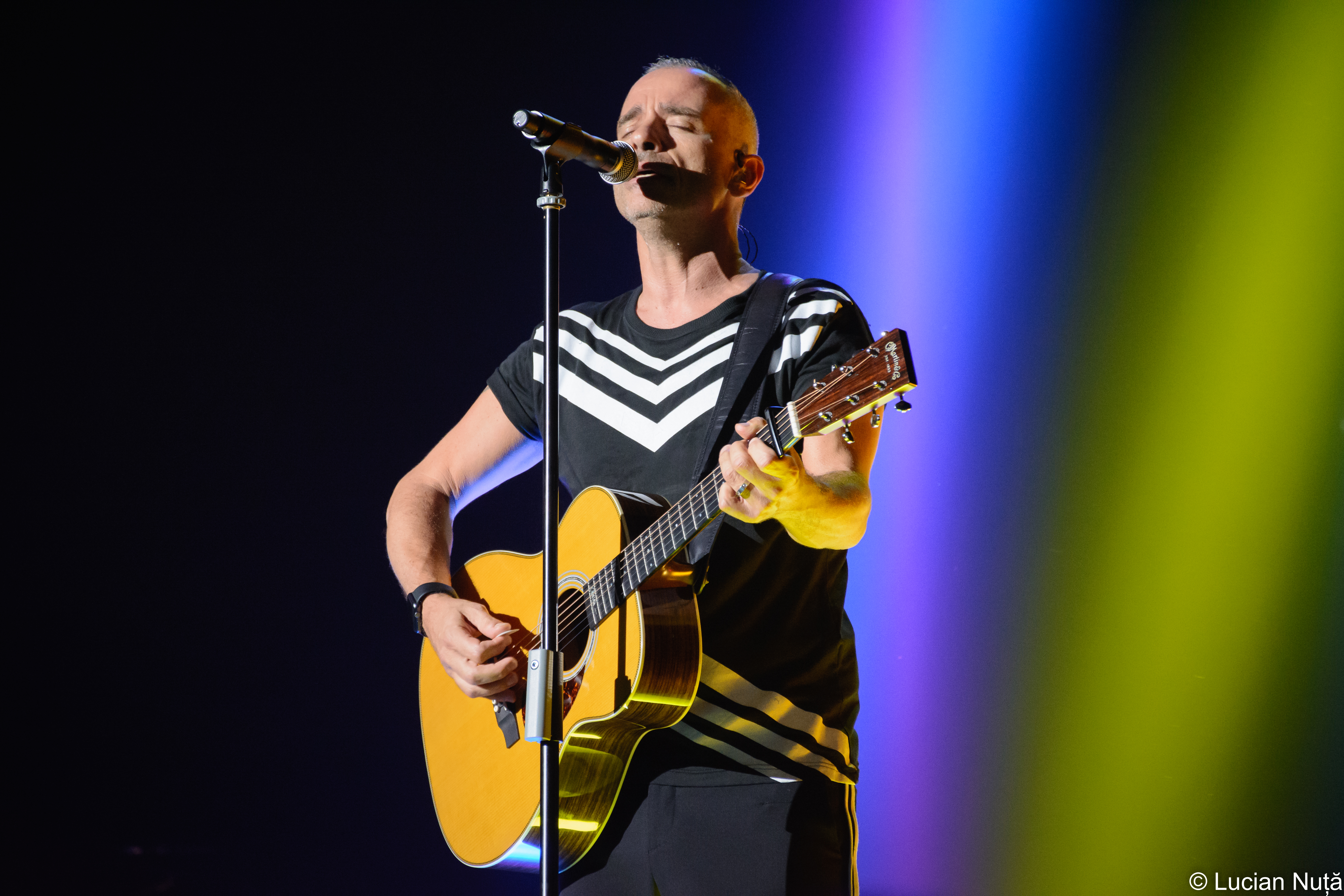
In Italy, Tribalistas reached second place in the album chart, behind only 9 by Eros Ramazzotti.

Tribalistas also achieved success in the international market. In Argentina, the Cámara Argentina de Productores de Fonogramas y Videogramas (CAPIF) awarded the album a platinum certification for selling 80,000 copies. In the United States, it reached the twelfth position on the Billboard World Albums chart. In Spain, it peaked at the 15th position on the album compilation chart, where it remained for a total of 49 consecutive weeks. Later, after selling 50,000 units there, it was awarded a gold certification by the Productores de Música de España (PROMUSICAE). In France, it spent 11 consecutive weeks on the album chart, debuting at the 139th position on 13 July 2003 and reaching its peak at the 39th position on 10 August. Meanwhile, in Italy, it debuted at the 8th position on 29 May 2003 and experienced gradual growth over the following weeks. On 26 June update, it finally rose to the second position—trailing only 9 by singer Eros Ramazzotti—which was its best result, remaining there for five consecutive weeks. It stayed on the chart for 33 weeks and finished 2003 as the 15th best-performing album. It received a gold certification from the Federazione Industria Musicale Italiana (FIMI) for sales of 25,000 units in the country, and by September of that year, this number had exceeded 100,000.

In Portugal, Tribalistas debuted at the 28th position on the chart published by the Associação Fonográfica Portuguesa (AFP), and by its eighth week, it had climbed to second place, losing the top spot only to St. Anger by Metallica. However, in the following edition, it rose to first place, a position it maintained for 15 consecutive weeks. It spent a total of 57 weeks on the chart, including reentries in 2017 and 2018 when the supergroup was touring for their reunion. The AFP certified it quadruple platinum in recognition of over 140,000 copies sold. Furthermore, it became the best-selling album of 2003 in Portugal. On the other hand, in Switzerland, despite spending six weeks on the Schweizer Hitparade, the album's best position was 90. Worldwide, Tribalistas sold a total of 3 million copies in 46 countries.

== Track listing ==
All songs produced by Marisa Monte and co-produced by Alê Siqueira, Arnaldo Antunes and Carlinhos Brown.

No.	Title	Writer(s)	Length
1.	"Carnavália"	Arnaldo Antunes · Carlinhos Brown · Marisa Monte	4:16
2.	"Um a Um"	Antunes · Brown · Monte	2:41
3.	"Velha Infância"	Antunes · Brown · Monte · Davi Moraes · Pedro Baby	4:10
4.	"Passe em Casa"	Antunes · Brown · Monte · Margareth Menezes	3:54
5.	"O Amor É Feio"	Antunes · Brown · Monte	3:11
6.	"É Você"	Antunes · Brown · Monte	2:51
7.	"Carnalismo"	Antunes · Brown · Monte · Cezar Mendes	2:36
8.	"Mary Cristo"	Antunes · Brown · Monte	3:00
9.	"Anjo da Guarda"	Antunes · Brown · Monte	2:47
10.	"Lá de Longe"	Antunes · Brown · Monte	2:17
11.	"Pecado É Lhe Deixar de Molho"	Antunes · Brown · Monte	2:58
12.	"Já Sei Namorar"	Antunes · Brown · Monte	3:16
13.	"Tribalistas"	Antunes · Brown · Monte	3:23
Total length:			41:20

== Personnel ==
The process of creating Tribalistas attributes the following credits:

=== Production ===
- Musical production: Marisa Monte
- Musical co-production: Alê Siqueira, Arnaldo Antunes, Carlinhos Brown
- Executive production: Surly Aguiar
- Mixing: Alê Siqueira, Flávio de Souza, Marisa Monte
- Composition: Arnaldo Antunes, Carlinhos Brown, Cézar Mendes, Davi Moraes, Marisa Monte, Margareth Menezes, Pedro Baby
- Mastering: Ricardo Garcia
- Recording engineering: Antoine Midani
- Studio assistance: Leonardo Netto

=== Instrumentation ===
- Vocals: Arnaldo Antunes, Carlinhos Brown, Margareth Menezes, Marisa Monte
- Guitar: Carlinhos Brown, Dadi Carvalho, Marisa Monte
- Clapping: Arnaldo Antunes, Carlinhos Brown, Dadi Carvalho, Marisa Monte
- Afoxé: Carlinhos Brown
- Bass drum: Carlinhos Brown
- Accordion: Dadi Carvalho, Marisa Monte
- Acoustic guitar: Carlinhos Brown, Marisa Monte
- Viola: Dadi Carvalho
- Bass: Dadi Carvalho
- Organ: Arnaldo Antunes, Marisa Monte
- Drums: Carlinhos Brown
- Whistle: Dadi Carvalho, Arnaldo Antunes
- Snare drum: Carlinhos Brown
- Agogô: Carlinhos Brown
- Caxixi: Carlinhos Brown
- Chapuis: Carlinhos Brown
- Cymbals: Carlinhos Brown
- Harmonica: Marisa Monte
- Harp: Carlinhos Brown
- Cajón: Marisa Monte
- Toy trumpet: Marisa Monte
- Trumpet: Marisa Monte
- Marimba: Carlinhos Brown
- Moringa: Carlinhos Brown
- Cuíca: Carlinhos Brown
- Glockenspiel: Carlinhos Brown
- Congas: Carlinhos Brown
- Tumba: Carlinhos Brown
- Tumbadora: Carlinhos Brown
- Djembe: Carlinhos Brown
- Bells: Carlinhos Brown
- Berimbau: Carlinhos Brown
- Bongos: Carlinhos Brown
- Tambourine: Carlinhos Brown
- Tombak: Carlinhos Brown
- Bacurinha: Carlinhos Brown
- Sound effects: Marisa Monte
- EBow: Dadi Carvalho
- Steel guitar: Dadi Carvalho
- Slide guitar: Dadi Carvalho
- Ukulele: Dadi Carvalho
- Piano: Dadi Carvalho
- Sitar: Dadi Carvalho
- Viol: Dadi Carvalho
- Steel-string acoustic guitar: Margareth Menezes

== Charts ==
Weekly charts for Tribalistas
Chart (2002–2004)	Peak position
Brazil (HITS)	1
France (SNEP)	39
Italy (FIMI)	2
Portugal (AFP)	1
Spain (PROMUSICAE)	15
Switzerland (Schweizer Hitparade)	90
World Albums (Billboard)	12

Monthly charts for Tribalistas
Chart (2007)	Peak position
Uruguay (CUDISCO)	10

Year-end charts for Tribalistas
Chart (2002)	Position
Brazil (Pro-Música Brasil)	5
Chart (2003)	Position
Brazil (Pro-Música Brasil)	12
Italy (FIMI)	14

== Certifications ==
Certifications for Tribalistas
Region	Certification	Certified units/sales
Argentina (CAPIF)	Platinum	40,000^{^}
Brazil (Pro-Música Brasil)	Diamond	2,100,000
Brazil (Pro-Música Brasil) for the DVD	Platinum	100,000
Italy (FIMI)	Gold	100,000
Portugal (AFP)	4× Platinum	160,000^{^}
Spain (Promusicae)	Gold	50,000^{^}
Summaries
Worldwide	—	3,000,000
^{^} Shipments figures based on certification alone.

== Release history ==
Country	Date	Format	Label(s)
Brazil	4 November 2002	CD · DVD · VHS	Phonomotor · EMI Brazil
United States	17 December 2002	CD	Blue Note Records
Europe	17 December 2002	CD	Blue Note Records
Argentina	3 February 2003	CD · DVD	Blue Note Records
Mexico	3 March 2003	CD	Blue Note Records
Brazil	May 2018	Vinyl	Universal Music Brasil

== See also ==
- 2002 in Latin music
- List of best-selling Latin albums
