= Tribalistas (2017 album) =

Studio album by Tribalistas
- Released: 25 August 2017
- Recorded: 20 March – 2 April 2017 (Rio de Janeiro, Brazil)
- Genres: MPB; pop
- Length: 38:45
- Labels: Phonomotor Records; Universal Music
- Producers: Marisa Monte; Arnaldo Antunes: Carlinhos Brown; Alê Siqueira; Daniel Carvalho (co-producers)

Tribalistas chronology
Tribalistas (2002)	Tribalistas (2017)

Marisa Monte chronology
O Que Você Quer Saber de Verdade (2011)	Tribalistas (2017)

Arnaldo Antunes chronology
Já É (2015)	Tribalistas (2017)	RSTUVXZ (2018)

Carlinhos Brown chronology
Artefireaccua - Incinerando o Inferno (2015)	Tribalistas (2017)	Semelhantes (2017)

Singles from Tribalistas
- 1. "Aliança" Released: 10 August 2017; 2. "Diáspora" Released: 10 August 2017; 3. "Um Só" Released: 10 August 2017; 4. "Fora da Memória" Released: 10 August 2017

Tribalistas is the second studio album by Brazilian supergroup Tribalistas, a trio consisting of Marisa Monte, Arnaldo Antunes and Carlinhos Brown. It was released on 25 August 2017, 15 years after their successful debut album.

== Background ==
In 2002, longtime partners Marisa Monte, Arnaldo Antunes and Carlinhos Brown formed supergroup Tribalistas. Their first album was released by the end of that year in Brazil and in the rest of the World in the following year. It was a huge success, topping charts and reaching diamond status after selling 1,5 million copies in the country, even with no promotion or interviews. They also received five nominations for the Latin Grammy Awards, winning one: Best Portuguese Language Contemporary Pop Album.

In 2013, they released a single titled "Joga Arroz" ("Throw Rice") in support of same-sex civil marriage. The song was featured at the website of the Casamento Civil Igualitário ("Egalitarian Civil Marriage") campaign, promoted by federal congressman Jean Wyllys. It did not receive TV and radio airplay, either.

Throughout 2016, Monte, Antunes and Brown traveled a couple of times to Salvador, Bahia, where they composed two or three songs a day. These sessions resulted in around 20 new songs.

Later, in November, Monte had Antunes and Brown as surprise guests at her show at Concha Acústica de Salvador. Together, they performed "Velha Infância", "Já Sei Namorar" and "Passe em Casa". The surprise performance led the media to speculate on a possible Tribalistas reunion.

== Release and promotion ==
The three members announced their return during a surprise live session held simultaneously at each of their official Facebook pages. In the video, they revealed four new tracks: "Diáspora", "Aliança", "Um Só" and "Fora da Memória".

The group also announced partnerships with Pedro Baby and Pretinho da Serrinha on two songs. A DVD, shot during the album recording sections between March and April 2017, was also confirmed. Additionally, a TV special called "Especial Tribalistas" was aired on 31 August on Rede Globo.

The album also received a hand album edition, an exclusive digital booklet with the songs, videos, chord charts, technical information and pictures of the trio during the recording sessions. The hand album is a partnership with Facebook and Spotify.

Later, on 28 March 2018, Monte, Antunes and Brown officially announced the much speculated and requested Tribalistas Tour 2018, the first by the trio. It brought them to ten Brazilian state capitals, including Salvador, Rio de Janeiro, Recife, Fortaleza, São Paulo, Porto Alegre, Belém, Curitiba, Brasília and Belo Horizonte.

== Cover art and booklet ==
=== CD and DVD ===
The cover art of the album features artwork by Luiz Zerbini, a friend of the three members and a renowned Brazilian multimedia artist. He followed the album recordings and produced illustrations of the band members as the songs were created and recorded.

=== Hand album ===
The album was released on a special edition called Hand Album and created in partnership with Facebook and Spotify. It was a request by the members to give a different meaning to the consuming of digital music. The platform was developed by Brazilians after a programming marathon held in Rio de Janeiro and prototypes tests until they reached a language that was easy to the public. The platform was then finished by professionals from the United States and Europe.

== Track listing ==
No.	Title	Writer(s)	Length
1.	"Diáspora" (Diaspora)	Arnaldo Antunes, Carlinhos Brown, Marisa Monte	4:04
2.	"Um Só" (One)	Antunes, Brown, Monte, Brás Antunes	3:19
3.	"Fora da Memória" (Out of the Memory)	Antunes, Brown, Monte, Pedro Baby, Pretinho da Serrinha	3:53
4.	"Aliança" (Alliance)	Antunes, Brown, Monte, Baby, Serrinha	3:57
5.	"Trabalivre" (A portmanteau of the words "trabalho" (work) and "livre" (free))	Antunes, Brown, Monte, Carminho	3:43
6.	"Baião do Mundo" (World Baião)	Antunes, Brown, Monte	3:17
7.	"Ânima" (Anima)	Antunes, Brown, Monte, Cezar Mendes	3:54
8.	"Feliz e Saudável" (Happy and Healthy)	Antunes, Brown, Monte	2:50
9.	"Lutar e Vencer" (To Fight and to Win)	Antunes, Brown, Monte	2:54
10.	"Os Peixinhos" (The Little Fish (featuring Carminho))	Antunes, Brown, Monte, Carminho	4:27
Total length:			38:45

== Reception ==
=== Critical reception ===
Professional ratings
Review scores
Source	Rating
Zero Hora	3/5 stars
Folha de S.Paulo	2/5 stars
Helder Maldonado	Unfavorable
O Estado de S. Paulo	Favorable
O Globo	Regular
Hoje em Dia	Unfavorable

Tribalistas received mixed to negative reviews from critics, with many considering it inferior to the trio's 2002 debut and some even labeling it as "unnecessary".

Writing for Zero Hora, Alexandre Lucchese expressed disbelief that the album would repeat the commercial success of its predecessor, but stated it shouldn't be a failure, either. He pointed the political and non-partisan tone as evidence of the band's maturing, called the title "lazy" and praised the track "Um Só", although he considered it a repetition of "Tribalistas", from the first album. He concluded his analysis by saying that "the album hardly creates estrangement or disgust, although it is also little likely to generate great empathy – and euphoria would be asking too much".

Marco Aurélio Canônico was more critical of the album, calling it "less creative, less inspired, less necessary". He said the similar sound of both albums could be seen both as "identity" and as "sign of creative fatigue". On the other hand, he considered that the songs authored by the three members alone work better than the partnerships. He concluded his text by stating that "in the cynical and bellicose times that lie ahead, Tribalistas look out of place with their peace and love spirit –perhaps precisely because of this they are necessary. But their new album show a trio that is not only smaller than the sum of its isolated parts, but than what it once was".

In his blog at R7, Helder Maldonado said the album "drags on on songs with little inspired arrangements and ideologically engaged lyrics". For him, the album fails to repeat the "elegance" of their debut and is "almost hermetic and overly focused on introspection". Besides that, he considered that the guest performances of other musicians decharacterized the project. Finally, he said that "maybe Tribalistas really wanted to innovate and release something completely different from the album that consecrated them. And they did it. And changing is always healthy. The problem is that it's not always for the better."

Writing for O Globo, Bernardo Araujo considered that the album comes "without a crisis, but without great moments, either" and that "big fans of the trio will, once more, enjoy it a lot, but Tribalistas, once more, appear to be having more fun than the public". Speaking specifically about the opening track "Diáspora", he considered it "bad luck" that the song was released on the same day as "As Caravanas", by Chico Buarque (a song that deals with the same theme).

At Hoje em Dia, Lucas Buzatti stated that the album "stumble upon the attempt of reproducing the feat [of their debut] with old formulas and repetitive themes". He praised the tracks "Diáspora", "Fora da Memória" and "Trabalivre", but criticized "Um Só", "Aliança", "Baião do Mundo" and "Ânima", writing mixed comments about "Feliz e Saudável", "Lutar e Vencer" and "Os Peixinhos". He ended his text by saying that "Tribalistas gets stuck at the more of the same. If on one hand the trio establishes its signature sound, on the other hand they expose a frustrating predictability for people waiting for something new."

Adriana Del Ré, from O Estado de S. Paulo, wrote a positive review about the album. She said that the return preserving "the tribalistic DNA" was a "relief" and that reuniting without doing so wouldn't make sense. On the other hand, she noted a change in the lyrics, which went from "a certain innocence" on the 2002 album to "a more politicized attitude" on the 2017 release.

=== Charts ===
Chart (2017)	Peak position
United States (Billboard World Albums)	13

=== Soundtrack ===
- "Aliança" was part of the soundtrack for the 9 pm telenovela O Outro Lado do Paraíso (2017), by Rede Globo.
- "Um Só" is part of the soundtrack for the series Malhação: Vidas Brasileiras (2018), also by Rede Globo.

=== Awards and nominations ===
Year	Award	Category	Result
2018	A2IM Libera Awards 2018	Best World Album	Nominated
2018	Prêmio da Música Brasileira	Visual Project	Nominated
2018	Prêmio da Música Brasileira	Best Pop/Rock/Reggae/Hip-hop/Funk Group	Nominated
2018	19th Annual Latin Grammy Awards	Best Portuguese Language Song – "Aliança"	Nominated

== Personnel ==
Taken from the album booklet:

Managing

- Monte Criação e Produção Ltda. (Phonomotor): label, owner of copyrights/phonographic copyrights
- Rosa Celeste (Universal Music Publishing Group): national/international distribution, licensing
- Ed. Candyall Music (SLEM): editor
- Published by Monte Songs and Sony/ATV Tree Publishing

Visuals and images

- Cover artwork: Luiz Zerbini
- Graphical project: Lêka Coutinho and Fabiano Feroli
- graphic coordination: Geysa Adnet
- Reviewing: Luiz Augusto
- Social media: Marco Froner and Carol Coelho
- Chord charts: Dadi Carvalho
- Clearances: Solange Ruiz

Produção

- Production: Marisa Monte
- Co-production: Arnaldo Antunes, Carlinhos Brown, Alê Siqueira and Daniel Carvalho
- Production director: Leonardo Netto
- Recording: Alê Siqueira e Daniel Carvalho
- Editing: Alê Siqueira, Daniel Carvalho e Marisa Monte
- Mixing and mastering: Daniel Carvalho
- Executive production: Suely Aguiar
- Studio coordination: Marcio Barros

Instrumentation

- Marisa Monte: lead vocals, acoustic guitar, claps, reco-reco, mouth percussion, Fender Rhodes, Hammond, pandeiro, wooden spoon and melodica
- Arnaldo Antunes: lead vocals, claps, mouth percussion
- Carlinhos Brown: lead vocals, handicraft electronics, berimbau, tambourine, drums, bongo drum, conga, shaker, Hammond, karkabou, bacurinha, beatbox, ganzá, afoxés, gong, ride cymbal, cajón, pandeirola, zampogna, Tenori-On, temple block, wood block, gã, Qchord, timbau, tumbadora, heat spreader, gaita de la sierra, rainstick, music box, chimes, snare drum, off-beaat, cowbell, accordion, pans, repinique, agogô, wristband and clef
- Carminho: lead vocals, metallophone, reco-reco and mouth percussion
- Dadi Carvalho: acoustic and electric guitar, sitar, claps, bass, Hammond, piano, mandolin and Fender Rhodes
- Cezar Mendes: acoustic guitar, claps
- Pedro Baby: acoustic and electric guitars
- Pretinho da Serrinha: cavaquinho

== Release history ==
Country	Date	Format(s)	Label
Brazil	1 May 2018	LP	Polysom
Brazil	25 August 2017	CD; Digital download	Phonomotor Records; Universal Music
Argentina	25 August 2017	Digital download	Phonomotor Records; Universal Music
Chile	25 August 2017	Digital download	Phonomotor Records; Universal Music
United States	25 August 2017	Digital download	Phonomotor Records; Universal Music
Canada	25 August 2017	Digital download	Phonomotor Records; Universal Music
Mexico	25 August 2017	Digital download	Phonomotor Records; Universal Music
United Kingdom	25 August 2017	Digital download	Phonomotor Records; Universal Music
Ireland	25 August 2017	Digital download	Phonomotor Records; Universal Music
Portugal	25 August 2017	Digital download	Phonomotor Records; Universal Music
France	25 August 2017	Digital download	Phonomotor Records; Universal Music
Spain	25 August 2017	Digital download	Phonomotor Records; Universal Music
Italy	25 August 2017	Digital download	Phonomotor Records; Universal Music
Belgium	25 August 2017	Digital download	Phonomotor Records; Universal Music
Germany	25 August 2017	Digital download	Phonomotor Records; Universal Music
Netherlands	25 August 2017	Digital download	Phonomotor Records; Universal Music
Switzerland	25 August 2017	Digital download	Phonomotor Records; Universal Music
Australia	25 August 2017	Digital download	Phonomotor Records; Universal Music
New Zealand	25 August 2017	Digital download	Phonomotor Records; Universal Music
Japan	25 August 2017	Digital download	Phonomotor Records; Universal Music
China	25 August 2017	Digital download	Phonomotor Records; Universal Music
