= Barulhinho Bom =

Live album and studio album by Marisa Monte
- Released: 1996
- Producers: Marisa Monte, Carlinhos Brown and Arto Lindsay

Marisa Monte chronology
Verde, Anil, Amarelo, Cor-de-Rosa e Carvão (1994)	Barulhinho Bom (1996)	Memórias, Crônicas, e Declarações de Amor (1999)

Barulhinho Bom is a live album by Brazilian singer Marisa Monte, released in 1996. It consists of two discs, the first one recorded on live and the second one in studio. It was also issued in the United States as A Great Noise, with a censor box in the cover, taken from the erotic comics of Carlos Zéfiro.

== Track listing ==
=== Disc 1 (live) ===
1. "Panis Et Circenses" (Gilberto Gil/Caetano Veloso)
2. "De Noite Na Cama" (Caetano Veloso)
3. "Beija Eu" (Marisa Monte/Arnaldo Antunes/Arto Lindsay)
4. "Give Me Love (Give Me Peace On Earth)" (George Harrison)
5. "Ainda Lembro" (Monte/Nando Reis)
6. "A Menina Dança" (Galvão/Moraes)
7. "Dança da Solidão" (Paulinho da Viola)
8. "Ao Meu Redor" (Reis)
9. "Bem Leve" (Antunes/Monte)
10. "Segue o Seco" (Carlinhos Brown)
11. "O Xote das Meninas" (Luiz Gonzaga)

=== Disc 2 (studio) ===
1. "Arrepio" (Brown)
2. "Magamalabares" (Brown)
3. "Chuva no Brejo" (Morais)
4. "Cérebro Eletrônico" (Gilberto Gil)
5. "Tempos Modernos" (Lulu Santos)
6. "Maraçá" (Brown)
7. "Blanco" (Haroldo Campos/Octavio Paz)
