= Verdade Uma Ilusão =

Live album by Marisa Monte
- Released: 2014

Verdade Uma Ilusão is a live album by Brazilian singer Marisa Monte, released on May 20, 2014. It was recorded in Rio de Janeiro in August 2013 in Cidade da Música Hall. In 2014, it was nominated for the Latin Grammy Award for Best MPB Album.

== Track listing ==
1. O que você quer saber de verdade (Marisa Monte / Carlinhos Brown / Arnaldo Antunes)
2. Descalço no parque (Jorge Ben Jor)
3. Arrepio (Carlinhos Brown)
4. Ilusão (Julieta Venegas /Arnaldo Antunes / Marisa Monte)
5. Depois (Arnaldo Antunes / Carlinhos Brown / Marisa Monte)
6. Amar alguém (Arnaldo Antunes / Dadi / Marisa Monte)
7. Diariamente (Nando Reis)
8. Infinito Particular (Arnaldo Antunes / Marisa Monte / Carlinhos Brown)
9. E.C.T. (Carlinhos Brown / Marisa Monte / Nando Reis)
10. De mais ninguém (Arnaldo Antunes / Marisa Monte)
11. Dizem (Quem Me Dera) (Arnaldo Antunes / Marisa Monte / Dadi)
12. Lencinho querido (El pañuelito) (Frederico Esposito / Versão: Haroldo Barbosa)
13. Sono Come Tu Mi Vuoi (Mina Mazzini)
14. Ainda Bem (Marisa Monte / Arnaldo Antunes)
15. Verdade, uma ilusão (Carlinhos Brown / Arnaldo Antunes / Marisa Monte)
16. Gentileza (Marisa Monte)
17. Não Vá Embora (Marisa Monte / Arnaldo Antunes)
