= Verde, Anil, Amarelo, Cor-de-Rosa e Carvão =

Studio album by Marisa Monte
- Released: 1994
- Genre: Pop; baroque pop; samba; MPB
- Length: 53:03
- Label: EMI-Odeon; Blue Note (US)
- Producer: Arto Lindsay

Marisa Monte chronology
Mais (1991)	Verde, Anil, Amarelo, Cor-de-Rosa e Carvão (1994)	Barulhinho Bom (1996)

Professional ratings
Review scores
Source	Rating
Allmusic	4.5/5 stars

Verde, Anil, Amarelo, Cor-de-Rosa e Carvão (transl. Green, Indigo, Yellow, Pink and Charcoal), distributed in the United States as Rose and Charcoal, is Brazilian singer Marisa Monte's second studio album and third overall, released in 1994. Contributors include well-known artists such as Gilberto Gil, Paulinho da Viola, Naná Vasconcelos, Carlinhos Brown, Arnaldo Antunes and the group Época de Ouro. The album includes the hits "Maria de verdade", "Na estrada", and "De mais ninguém".

It was listed by Rolling Stone Brazil as one of the 100 best Brazilian albums in history.

== Track listing ==
#	Title	Songwriters	Length
1.	"Maria de verdade"	Carlinhos Brown	3:54
2.	"Na estrada"	Marisa Monte, Nando Reis, Carlinhos Brown	3:33
3.	"Ao meu redor"	Reis	3:56
4.	"Segue o seco"	Brown	5:01
5.	"Pale Blue Eyes"	Lou Reed	5:10
6.	"Dança da solidão"	Paulinho da Viola	3:36
7.	"De mais ninguém"	Monte, Arnaldo Antunes	3:30
8.	"Alta noite"	Antunes	3:54
9.	"O céu"	Reis, Monte	3:35
10.	"Bem leve"	Monte, Antunes	2:32
11.	"Balança pema"	Jorge Ben Jor	3:05
12.	"Enquanto isso"	Monte, Reis	4:29
13.	"Esta melodia"	Bubú da Portela, Jamelão	6:42

== Personnel ==
- Marisa Monte: vocals
- Nando Reis: acoustic guitar
- Arthur Maia:bass
- Jorginho Gomes: drums
- Marcos Suzano: percussion
- Carlinhos Brown: percussion
- Arnaldo Antunes: vocals
