= O Que Você Quer Saber de Verdade =

O Que Você Quer Saber De Verdade

Studio album by Marisa Monte
- Released: 2011
- Producer: Marisa Monte and Dadi

O Que Você Quer Saber De Verdade ("What You Really Want to Know") is a studio album by Brazilian singer Marisa Monte, released in October 2011. Its featured songs include "Ainda Bem" and "O Que Você Quer Saber De Verdade". It reached number one in Brasil Hot 100 Airplay ranking.

== Track listing ==
1. O que você quer saber de verdade (Marisa Monte / Carlinhos Brown / Arnaldo Antunes)
2. Descalço no parque (Jorge Ben Jor)
3. Depois (Arnaldo Antunes / Carlinhos Brown / Marisa Monte)
4. Amar alguém (Arnaldo Antunes / Dadi / Marisa Monte)
5. O que se quer (Rodrigo Amarante / Marisa Monte)
6. Nada tudo (André Carvalho)
7. Verdade, uma ilusão (Carlinhos Brown / Arnaldo Antunes / Marisa Monte)
8. Lencinho querido (El pañuelito) (Frederico Esposito / Versão: Haroldo Barbosa)
9. Ainda Bem (Marisa Monte / Arnaldo Antunes)
10. Aquela velha canção (Carlinhos Brown / Marisa Monte)
11. Era óbvio (Marisa Monte / Arnaldo Antunes)
12. Hoje eu não saio não (Arnaldo Antunes / Marcelo Jeneci / Betão / Chico Salem)
13. Seja feliz (Dadi / Marisa Monte / Arnaldo Antunes)
14. Bem aqui (Dadi / Arnaldo Antunes)

== Charts ==
=== Year-end charts ===
| Chart (2011) | Peak position |
|---|---|
| Brazilian Albums (Pro-Música Brasil) | 14 |

| Chart (2012) | Peak position |
|---|---|
| Brazilian Albums (Pro-Música Brasil) | 15 |
