= Alfagamabetizado =

Studio album by Carlinhos Brown
- Released: (Brazil) 1996
- Genre: MPB
- Label: Delabel; EMI
- Producer: Wally Badarou, Arto Lindsay and Carlinhos Brown.

Carlinhos Brown chronology
Alfagamabetizado (1996)	Omelete Man (1999)

Professional ratings
Review scores
Source	Rating
Allmusic	4.5/5 stars

Alfagamabetizado is the first album released by Brazilian recording artist Carlinhos Brown. The 16-track album was produced by Wally Badarou, Arto Lindsay and Brown himself.

Among the songs, "Quixabeira" was a highlight, bringing Doces Bárbaros, Caetano Veloso, Gilberto Gil, Gal Costa and Maria Bethânia together again. Marisa Monte and Nando Reis participated on the track "Seo Zé". There are guest appearances throughout the album from international artists, such as on "Angel's Robot List", for which the Greek Alexandra Teodoropoulou recites the Greek alphabet. In the background, the violin of Kouider Berkane (from Mauritania) is mixed with percussion from surdo drums, and recorded in the Concha Acústica de Salvador theater.

For the album's release, Carlinhos Brown performed more than 150 shows throughout Brazil, the United States, Japan and Europe. The track "A Namorada" was the biggest success, and was included on the soundtrack of the film Speed 2.

== Track listing ==
All lyrics and music by Carlinhos Brown, except where noted.

1. "Angel's Robot List"
2. "Pandeiro-deiro"
3. "Covered Saints"
4. "Cumplicidade de Armário"
5. "Argila"
6. "Tour"
7. "Bog la Bag" (Carlinhos Brown, Celso Fonseca)
8. "O Bode" (Carlinhos Brown, Alain Tavares)
9. "Comunidade-Lobos"
10. "Frases Ventias"
11. "Quixabeira" (Public domain. Arrangement and adaptation: Carlinhos Brown, B. Von der Weid, Afonso Machado)
12. "Seo Zé" (Carlinhos Brown, Nando Reis, Marisa Monte)
13. "Mares de Ti"
14. "Zanza"
15. "A Namorada"
16. "Vanju Concessa"
