= MM (album) =

Live album by Marisa Monte
- Released: January 18, 1989
- Recorded: September 30 and October 1–3, 1988
- Venue: Teatro Villa-Lobos, Rio de Janeiro
- Length: 44:17
- Label: EMI
- Producer: Nelson Motta

Marisa Monte chronology
MM (1989)	Mais (1991)

MM (titled Marisa Monte MM (Ao Vivo) on digital platforms) is a live album by Brazilian singer Marisa Monte, released in 1989. It was her first album and was recorded live. It reached number one in Brasil Hot 100 Airplay. In 2022, it was elected as one of the best Brazilian music albums of the last 40 years by a O Globo poll which involved 25 specialists, including Charles Gavin, Nelson Motta, and others.

== Track listing ==
1. "Comida" (Arnaldo Antunes/Sérgio Britto/Marcelo Frommer)
2. "Bem Que Se Quis (E Po' Che Fa')" (Pino Daniele/ versão: Nelson Motta)
3. "Chocolate" (Tim Maia)
4. "Ando Meio Desligado" (Arnaldo Baptista/Sérgio Dias Baptista/Rita Lee)
5. "Preciso Me Encontrar" (Candeia)
6. "O Xote das Meninas" (Zé Dantas/Luiz Gonzaga)
7. "Negro Gato" (Getúlio Cortes)
8. "Lenda das Sereias, Rainha do Mar" (Vicente Matos Dinoel/Vicente Mattos/Arlindo Velloso)
9. "South American Way" (Al Dubin/Jimmy McHugh)
10. "I Heard It Through the Grapevine" (Barrett Strong/Norman Whitfield)
  - (CD version only)
11. "Bess, You Is My Woman Now" (George Gershwin/Ira Gershwin/DuBose Heyward)
12. "Speak Low" (Ogden Nash/Kurt Weill)
