= Tribalistas =

Brazilian supergroup

- Origin: Brazil
- Genres: Alternative rock, avant-garde, experimental rock, pop rock, MPB, adult contemporary
- Years active: 2002–2004, 2013, 2017-present
- Labels: EMI (2002-2004); Universal Music (2017-present)
- Members: Marisa Monte; Arnaldo Antunes; Carlinhos Brown

Tribalistas (Brazilian Portuguese: [tɾibaˈlistɐs, tɾibaˈliʃtɐʃ]) is a Brazilian supergroup consisting of Arnaldo Antunes (ex-Titãs), Marisa Monte and Carlinhos Brown (Timbalada). Their debut collaboration resulted in the popular album Tribalistas, released in Brazil in late 2002 by EMI and in international territories in 2003. The album attained considerable popularity despite the group never performing any song on TV or giving any radio interviews.

A DVD release featuring the 'making of' and all the tracks on the album was also released internationally. The song "Já Sei Namorar" was featured in the video game FIFA Football 2004 and FIFA 23 and the song "Velha Infancia" was used as part of the soundtrack of the Brazilian soap opera Mulheres Apaixonadas.

In May 2013, it was announced that the three members would release a song called "Joga Arroz" (Throw Rice), in order to express their support of same-sex marriage, though it was not referred to as a revival of the band.

In April 2017, a column of newspaper O Globo announced that the trio had reunited in the previous month to compose new songs. In August of the same year, the band officially announced their reunion and released a new album.

== Discography ==
=== Albums ===
Album Title	Album details	Peak chart positions					Sales	Certifications
Album Title	Album details	BRA	FRA	ITA	POR	SUI	Sales	Certifications
Tribalistas	Released: November 22, 2002; Label: EMI; Format: CD	1	39	2	1	90	World: 3,500,000; BRA: 2,300,000; POR: 160,000; SPA: 160,000; ITA: 210,000	ABPD: Diamond; AFP: 4× Platinum; FIMI: 3× Platinum; PROMUSICAE: 2× Platinum
Tribalistas	Released: August 25, 2017; Label: Universal Music; Format: CD	1	67	30	1	—	BRA: 50,000	ABPD: Gold

=== Video albums ===
Album title	Album details	Peak chart positions		Sales	Certifications
Album title	Album details	BRA	POR	Sales	Certifications
Tribalistas	Released: November 22, 2002; Label: EMI; Format: VHS, DVD	1	29	BRA: 100,000	ABPD: Platinum
Tribalistas	Released: August 25, 2017; Label: Universal Music; Format: DVD	1	—	BRA: 40,000	ABPD: Gold

=== Singles ===
List of singles as lead artist, with selected chart positions, showing year released and album name
Title	Year	Peak chart positions							Album	Certifications
Title	Year	BRA	EUR	FRA	ITA	NDL	POR	SWI	Album	Certifications
"Já Sei Namorar"	2002	1	56	84	46	34	2	75	Tribalistas	ITA: Gold
"Velha Infância"	2003	1	—	—	—	—	—	—	Tribalistas	
"É Você"	2004	8	—	—	—	—	—	—	Tribalistas	
"Aliança"	2017	—	—	—	—	—	93	—	Tribalistas (2017)	
"Diáspora"	2017	—	—	—	—	—	41	—	Tribalistas (2017)	
"Um Só"	2017	—	—	139	—	—	—	—	Tribalistas (2017)	
"Fora da Memória"	2017	—	—	—	—	—	117	—	Tribalistas (2017)	

=== Promotional singles ===
Title	Year	Album
"Joga Arroz"	2013	Single Only
