= A Gente Mora no Agora =

Studio album by Paulo Miklos
- Released: August 11, 2017
- Genres: MPB, samba, frevo, tropicália
- Length: 41:01
- Label: Deckdisc/Natura Musical
- Producers: Pupillo and Apollo Nove

Paulo Miklos chronology
Vou Ser Feliz e Já Volto (2001)	A Gente Mora no Agora (2017)

Singles from A Gente Mora no Agora
- 1. "A Lei Desse Troço" Released: 7 July 2017

A Gente Mora no Agora ("We Live in the Now") is the third album by Brazilian singer-songwriter Paulo Miklos, his first following his departure from Titãs. It was funded by the Natura Music project and released on 11 August 2017 via Deckdisc.

A Gente Mora no Agora comes following a series of significant events in Miklos' life, including the deaths of his parents and his wife and end of his career with Titãs. It features autobiographical elements, like his two previous albums. All songs are written or co-written by notable Brazilian musicians, including experienced names and more recent artists. These include Lurdez da Luz, Céu, Nando Reis, Erasmo Carlos, among others.

The album was met with positive reviews and a brief, 15-day domestic tour followed its release.

== Background and promotion ==
Between 2012 and 2014, Miklos lost his wife and his parents, and their deaths impacted the album, specifically the track "Vou Te Encontrar" (see "Song information" section below). His new girlfriend, Renata Galvão, was another inspiration for the album, which talks about "love and life".

On 11 July 2016, Miklos announced his departure from Titãs, intending to focus on individual projects. By then, he already started to work on the album. In June 2017, he announced that the album would be produced by Pupillo (Nação Zumbi drummer), musically directed by the journalist and researched Marcus Preto and would feature several collaborations, including Emicida, Dadi Carvalho, Erasmo Carlos on "País Elétrico", Guilherme Arantes on "Estou Pronto" and Russo Passapusso (BaianaSystem) on "Vigia". Former Titãs members Arnaldo Antunes and Nando Reis (who left the band before him) were also invited, but they were yet to be confirmed by that time.

In July 2017, the album's title was revealed and a release show was announced for July 17 in São Paulo. The album was funded by cosmetics giant Natura with support by the Lei Rouanet, via a public call for musical projects. Galvão was the one responsible for enlisting the album on the project.

The brief album promotional tour began on 17 August in São Paulo and ended on 1 September in Salvador, Bahia. Apart from album songs, the shows included Titãs songs and covers of songs by Adoniran Barbosa, Chet Baker and Noel Rosa, musicians he portrayed as an actor.

On 19 September, the album was released in vinyl format.

== Production, recording and concept ==
Although he had already released two solo albums, Miklos considers A Gente Mora no Agora to be his first solo effort, due to the fact that it is his first as a solo artist – the other two releases are seen by him more as Titãs side projects. As with the other ones, it is an album with elements of autobiography, with songs that express what the singer was experiencing at the time of the album's creation, but with a positive atmosphere, "beginning with the cover, I say it's a solar, upwards album, because it deals with overcoming in an already calm moment, in a moment of life rebuilding, of living in happiness. That's the album tonic for sure." Miklos says the album wouldn't sound like it sounds if he had not left Titãs to fully dedicate himself to the project.

In interviews, he stated he wanted to show his Brazilian musical formation on the album, besides looking for many collaborations without compromising its homogeneity. He commented: "The music of Brazil goes from Emicida, Lurdez da Luz to Erasmo Carlos. It's very rich and very current. We've got the most interesting electronic and mixture things. I'm exploring it all in this album. I believe to be speaking a language that is kind of universal. And the fact that I'm a interpreter is kind of a bridge for me to play and communicate with different generations. I believe in it". When asked if the album moved him away from rock, he replied:

No, not at all. Rock is my school, it's my thing. Whenever I sing a song, I bring this thing with me, and I find that interesting, as an interpreter, to broaden my possibilities, I always liked to think this way. As a band member I always sang the melodic songs and the aggressive ones. As an interpreter, I like to experiment with everything.

In another interview, he stated: "If we don't have that rock n roll feeling, that the sound if really important, on the other hand what's really noticeable are the songs. Melody, lyrics, it all comes really forward. It's a personal wish of mine to experiment and have a sonority that brings something new."

The songs' creation process took two months. Most of them were prepared via e-mails and instant messages. They were prepared using the acoustic guitar as the main instrument and then developed around it. Miklos comments that "this is something you have to do deliberately. You have to call the people, to know what you want and propose it. Now, whatever's going to happen following these meetings is a mystery". The musician also considered the process a mixture of "a conscious search for a place to arrive" and "the need to leave things open for the ideas to happen, to collect the results and deal with whatever could happen during that period". The album as a whole took six months to be done.

=== Title ===
The album title comes from the lyrics to the opening track, "A Lei desse Troço". According to Miklos, "this is a name that looks like an interesting call to me, taken from a verse by Emicida, which is very precise. It's an idea of not living in the anxiety for the future nor in the nostalgia of the past. Even with such a long career, I'm writing a new page, a blank one, with total freedom."

== Song information ==
Ten of the 13 tracks were created in collaboration with other musicians; the remaining three are solely credited to the collaborators. Miklos chose musicians he admires, both the experienced ones that inspired him and the more recent ones that caught his attention, besides names that came to prominence simultaneously with him.

The single "A Lei Desse Troço" was written in collaboration with rapper Emicida, first on the paper, and finally on the cellphone through instant messaging. It also features arrangements by Letieres Leite. Miklos sees the track as a profile of himself written by Emicida.

The partnership with Russo Passapusso resulted in the track "Vigia", but they only met three months after the song was created. Miklos sent he lyrics to "Todo Grande Amor" to Silva and allowed him to change its arrangement at will. After the track was sent back as a bossa nova song, Pupillo reworked it a little bit so it became more uplifting.

"Risco Azul", one of the collaborations with Céu, was defined as "a bolero, almost a tango" with a string arrangement. "Princípio Ativo" is the other track co-written by her, following a request from Miklos that she writes something about the female world from her perspective.

"Vou te Encontrar" was released on July 28 and co-written by Nando Reis, another former member of Titãs, inspired by the deaths of Miklos' parents and also his wife Rachel, who died of cancer in 2013. About its creating process, Miklos said:

I sent him some lyrics and then I asked: 'Hey, did you see it?' He said he did, but couldn't nail it. Later, after some time, [he] called me and said: 'Look, it was all of a sudden, I woke up with a complete song in my head. I've done it for you, about you'. It had nothing to do with the lyrics I'd sent. [...] It's very interesting because it's sung by my voice, but at the same time, written by him. 'Vou te encontrar', he says. It's this thing of the memories of the people you lost being in you, in the nature. There's a very beautiful and sensible thing of facing that affectionately. When I heard the song, I was moved. He knows my story. The people I've lost are dear to him too.

"País Elétrico" is a collaboration with Erasmo Carlos and inspired by his song "Pega na Mentira" ("Grab the Lie"). It plays on the fact that Brazil is the country with most lightning strikes in the world and the expression "May lightning strike me if I'm lying" to suggest that it is the country where people lie the most in the world.

About "Não Posso Mais", composed by Mallu Magalhães, Miklos said: "It's a portrait of the male way of thinking, the man's side of a relationship. In her voice, it had some irony". "Afeto Manifesto", a collaboration with rapper Lurdez da Luz, tells a love story in times of fierce political debates.

"Eu Vou" is another song inspired by Rachel. It was written solely by Tim Bernardes, of O Terno fame, and who also contributed to "Samba Bomba".

== Critical reception ==
Professional ratings
Review scores
Source	Rating
Omelete	4/5 stars
Mauro Ferreira	5/5 stars

Writing for the website Omelete, Felipe Cotta said the album is "delicious to listen to" and that it showcases Miklos' Brazilian influences at the same time that it keeps its essence, including elements from Titãs. He also said that "since the Cabeça Dinossauro times (1986) he can prove himself to be a multifaceted messenger. now he brings that with collaborations too" and concluded his analysis by saying that the album is "optimistic, full of mirrors of his own story, even if totally well adorned with elements of the present moment".

Mauro Ferreira, from G1, considers "reducing the tendency of characterizing the [...] album as a record in which the singer [...] takes 'a dive in Brazilian music'. [...] A gente mora no agora is a pop solo album which renews and expands the signature of the work authored by Miklos." Later, he would consider this and Mônica Salmaso's Caipira as the best albums of August 2017.

It was elected the 17th best Brazilian album of 2017 by the Brazilian edition of Rolling Stone.

== Track listing ==
No.	Title	Writer(s)	Length
1.	"A Lei Desse Troço" (The Law of This Thing)	Paulo Miklos, Emicida	3:07
2.	"Vigia" (Watch)	Miklos, Russo Passapusso	2:28
3.	"Risco Azul" (Blue Risk)	Miklos, Pupillo, Céu	3:50
4.	"Vou te Encontrar" (I'll Meet You)	Nando Reis	4:34
5.	"Todo Grande Amor" (Every Great Love)	Miklos, Silva	3:12
6.	"País Elétrico" (Electric Country)	Miklos, Erasmo Carlos	3:15
7.	"Estou Pronto" ("I'm Ready")	Miklos, Guilherme Arantes	3:16
8.	"Não Posso Mais" (No Longer Can)	Mallu Magalhães	2:37
9.	"Princípio Ativo" (Active Ingredient)	Miklos, Céu	3:27
10.	"Afeto Manifesto" (Manifested Affection)	Miklos, Lurdez da Luz	3:23
11.	"Samba Bomba" (Bomb Samba)	Miklos, Tim Bernardes	2:08
12.	"Deixar de Ser Alguém" (To Stop Being Someone)	Miklos, Arnaldo Antunes	2:41
13.	"Eu Vou" (I'm Going)	Bernardes	3:03
Total length:			41:01

== Personnel ==
Personnel per multiple sources:

- Paulo Miklos – lead vocals and acoustic guitar
- Everson Pessoa – acoustic guitar
- Dadi – bass
- Maurício Fleury – piano, keyboards
- Pupillo – drums

Guest performances

- Russo Passapusso – co-lead vocals in "Vigia"
- Céu – co-lead vocals on "Princípio Ativo"
- Guilherme Arantes – piano on "Estou Pronto"
- Apollo Nove – various instruments, including Oberheim synthesizers
- Letieres Leite & Orkestra Rumpilezz (André Becker, Gilmar Chaves, João Teoria, Léo Rocha, Rudney Machado, Vinícius Freitas) – wind instruments on "A Lei Desse Troço"
- Mauricio Bade – percussion

One year prior to the album release, the band then expected to take part of it was totally different and all female: Mônica Agena on guitar, Ana Karina Sebastião on bass, Luna França on keyboards and Nana Rizinni on drums.

Technical personnel

- Marcus Preto – artistic direction
- Pupillo and Apollo Nove – production
- Renata Galvão – executive production
- Mario Caldato Jr. – mixing
- Letieres Leite – wind instrument arrangement on A Lei Desse Troço"
- Miguel Atwood-Ferguson – strings arrangement on "Todo Grande Amor"
- Maestro Duda – arrangement
- Jorge Bispo – visual conception

Touring band

- Paulo Miklos – lead vocals
- Michele Cordeiro – electric and acoustic guitar
- Renato Neto – keyboards and musical direction
- Otavio Carvalho – bass
- Michele Abul – drums
