= Mais (album) =

Studio album by Marisa Monte
- Released: 1991
- Producer: Arto Lindsay

Marisa Monte chronology
MM (1989)	Mais (1991)	Verde, Anil, Amarelo, Cor-de-Rosa e Carvão (1994)

Mais is the first studio album by Brazilian singer Marisa Monte, released in 1991. By the time of the album's release, newspaper O Estado de S. Paulo praised the album, saying Monte was "less dramatic, with her voice even more tuned and crystalline, which seemed impossible, Monte even commoves. And, definitely, enters the pantheon of the titans, in all senses." In a 2020 retrospective review for his blog on G1, Mauro Ferreira said the album saw the emerging of "a Brazilian pop music which conciliated MPB, rock, samba and Northeastern [Brazil] music without having one genre overcome the other" and that Mais "reversed expectations of the ones waiting for another album of Brazilian music jewels polishing".

== Track listing ==
1. "Beija Eu" (Marisa Monte/Arnaldo Antunes/Arto Lindsay)
2. "Volte para o Seu Lar" (Antunes)
3. "Ainda Lembro" (Monte/Nando Reis) featuring Ed Motta
4. "De Noite na Cama " (Caetano Veloso)
5. "Rosa" (Pixinguinha/Otávio de Souza)
6. "Borboleta" (Folclore Nordestino)
7. "Ensaboa" (Cartola/Monsueto)
8. "Eu Não Sou da Sua Rua " (Branco Mello/Antunes)
9. "Diariamente" (Reis)
10. "Eu Sei (Na Mira)" (Monte)
11. "Tudo Pela Metade" (Monte/Reis)
12. "Mustapha" (Reis/Monte)

== Personnel ==
- Marisa Monte – vocals
- Bernie Worrell (tracks 1, 2, 4 & 11), Ryuichi Sakamoto (3, 5, 7, 10 & 12) – keyboards
- Marc Ribot (1, 2, 4 & 11), Robertinho do Recife (3, 6, 10 & 12), Romero Lubambo (8 & 9) – guitar
- Arto Lindsay – guitar, vocals (2, 4, 10 & 11)
- John Zorn – alto saxophone (2 & 7)
- Marty Ehrlich – tenor saxophone (2 & 7)
- Carol Emanuel – harp (9)
- Melvin Gibbs (1, 2, 4 & 11), Ricardo Feijão (7, 10 & 12) – bass
- Dougie Bowne (1, 2, 4 & 11), Gigante Brazil (7, 10 & 12) – drums
- Naná Vasconcelos (2, 4, 8 & 11), Armando Marçal (3, 4, 5, 7, 10 & 12), Prince Vasconcelos de Bois (6), Cyro Baptista (9) – percussion
- Criançada – backing vocals (11)
