= Memórias, Crônicas, e Declarações de Amor =

Memórias, Crônicas e Declarações de Amor

Studio album by Marisa Monte
- Released: 2000
- Producer: Marisa Monte and Arto Lindsay

Memórias, Crônicas e Declarações de Amor ("Memoirs, Short Stories and Love Confessions") is a studio album by Brazilian singer Marisa Monte, released in 2000. Its featured song include "Amor I Love You". It reached number one in Brasil Hot 100 Airplay ranking. It was followed by a DVD of the same name, released in 2000, featuring her performances at the ATL Hall, in Rio de Janeiro, over three nights.

== Track listing ==
1. "Amor I Love You" (Marisa Monte/Carlinhos Brown)
2. "Não Vá Embora" (Monte/Arnaldo Antunes)
3. "O Que Me Importa" (Cury)
4. "Não é Fácil" (Monte/Brown/Antunes)
5. "Perdão Você" (Brown/Alaim Tavares)
6. "Tema de Amor" (Monte/Brown)
7. "Abololô" (Monte/Lucas Santtana)
8. "Para Ver as Meninas" (Paulinho da Viola)
9. "Cinco Minutos" (Jorge Ben)
10. "Gentileza" (Monte)
11. "Água Também é Mar" (Monte/Brown/Antunes)
12. "Gotas de Luar" (Nelson Cavaquinho/Guilherme de Brito)
13. "Sou Seu Sabiá" (Caetano Veloso)

== Charts ==
=== Year-end charts ===
Chart (2000)	Peak position
Brazilian Albums (Pro-Música Brasil)	5
