= Grupo Corpo =

Brazilian dance theatre company

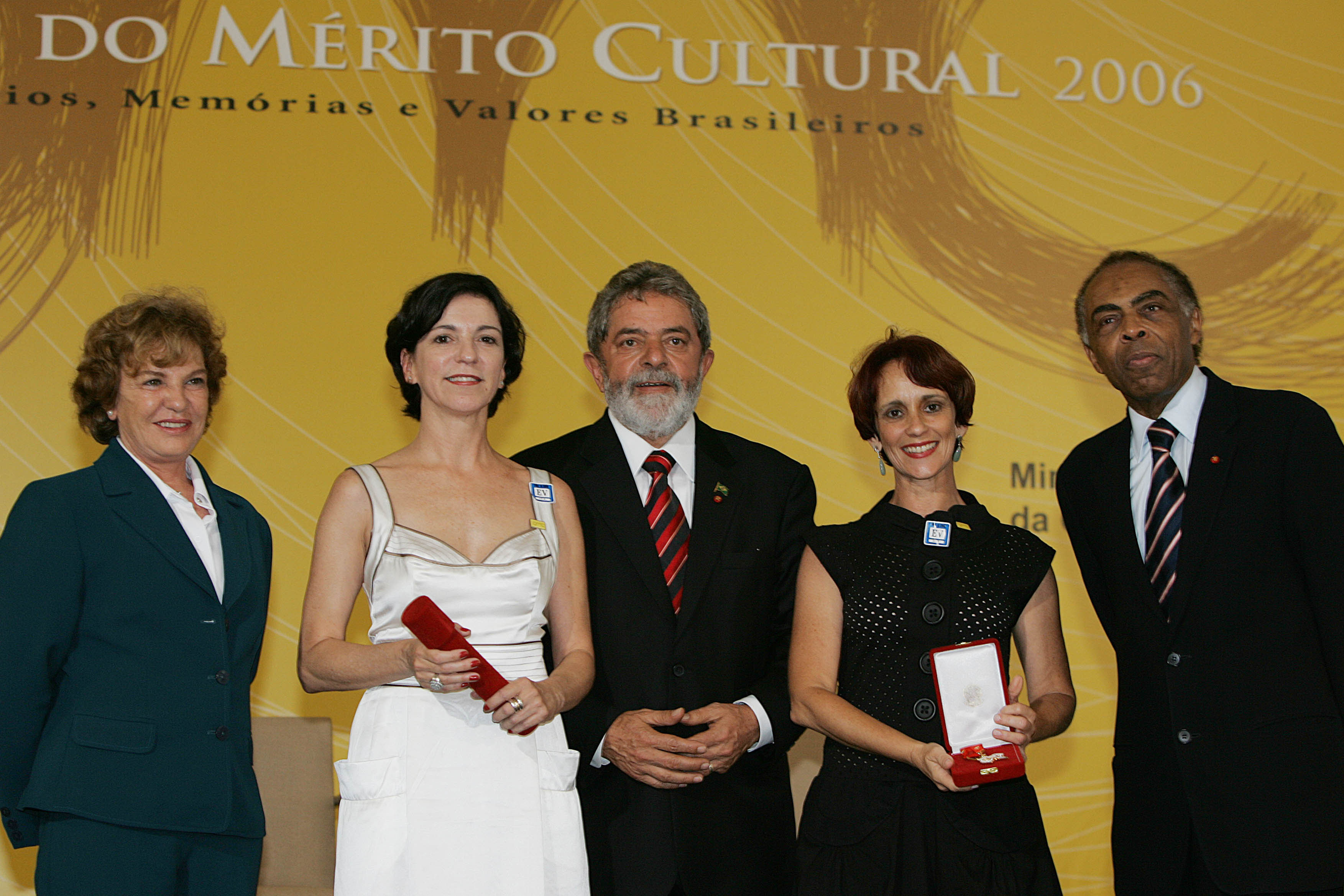
- Members of Grupo Corpo receiving the Ordem do Mérito Cultural in 2006
- Formation: 1975 in Belo Horizonte, Brazil
- Type: Theatre group
- Purpose: Contemporary dance
- Website: www.grupocorpo.com.br/en/

Grupo Corpo are a Brazilian dance theatre company founded in 1975. The group performs internationally and has been acclaimed by critics. Their routines are particularly known for challenging audience perceptions of ballet and modern dance.

== History ==
Grupo Corpo was created in Belo Horizonte by Paulo Pederneiras. It is a contemporary dance company, which is typically Brazilian in its creations. During Corpo's history, it went through several changes in style and structure but has always maintained the common thread of using a Brazilian base to its dancing and music.

The group's first ballet was Maria Maria. It reached a record as far as local production goes: the company traveled through 14 countries and ran in Brazil from 1976 to 1982.
