= Candeal =

Municipality of Bahia, Brazil

- Municipality
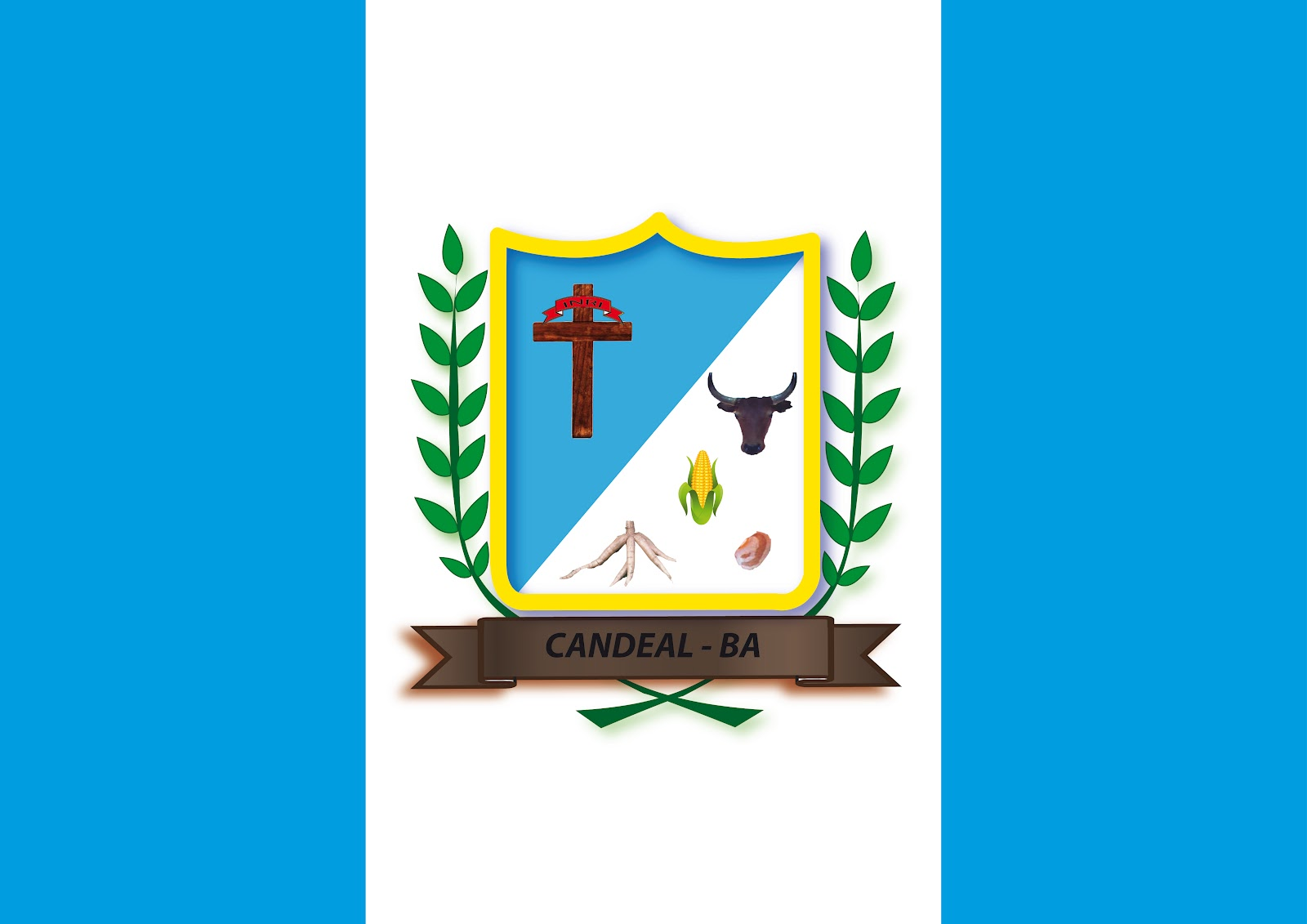
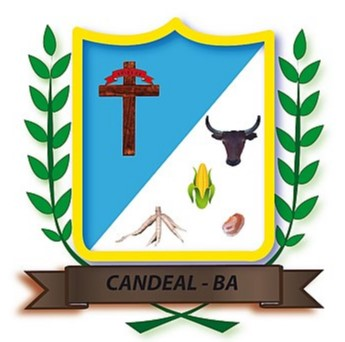
- Flag Coat of arms

- Location within Brazil
- Coordinates: 11°48′28″S 39°07′08″W
- Country: Brazil
- State: Bahia

Population (2020)
  - Total: 8,181
- Time zone: UTC−3 (BRT)

Candeal is a municipality in the Brazilian state of Bahia.
