= Marisa Monte =

Brazilian singer, musician and record producer (born 1967)

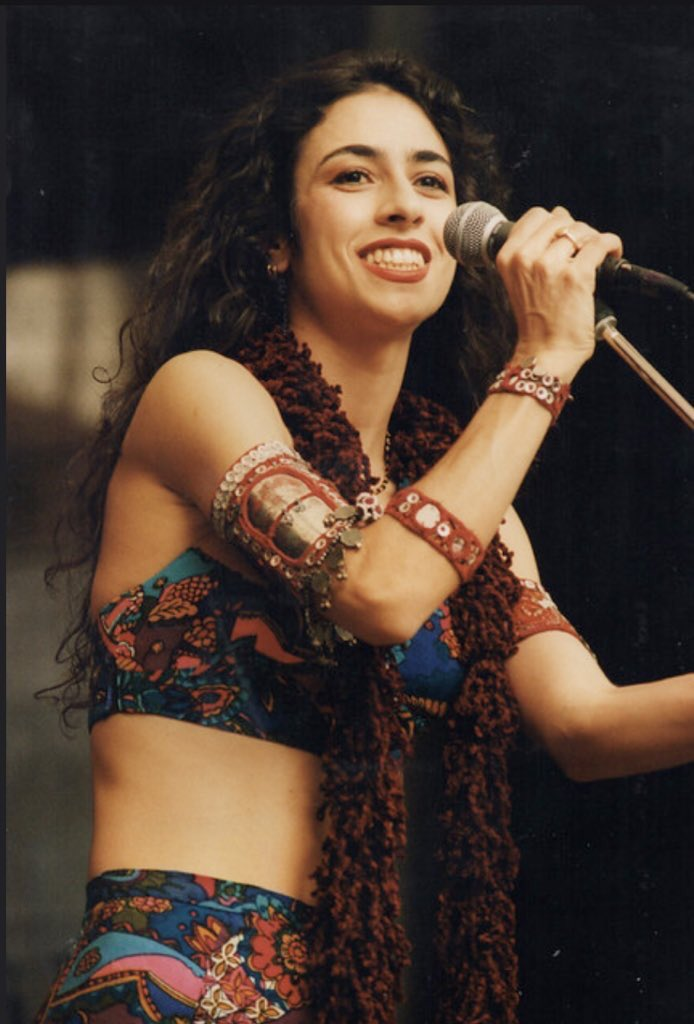
- Monte in 1995

Background information
- Born: Marisa de Azevedo Monte; 1 July 1967 (age 59); Rio de Janeiro, Brazil
- Genres: Música popular brasileira; samba
- Occupations: Singer; composer; instrumentalist; record producer
- Instruments: Vocals; guitar; cavaquinho; ukulele

Marisa de Azevedo Monte (Brazilian Portuguese: [maˈɾizɐ dʒ(i) azeˈvedu ˈmõtʃi]; born 1 July 1967) is a Brazilian singer, composer, instrumentalist, and record producer of Brazilian popular music and samba. As of 2011, she had sold 10 million albums worldwide and has won numerous national and international awards, including four Latin Grammys, eight Brazilian Music Awards, seven Brazilian MTV Video Music Awards, nine Multishow de Música Brasileira awards, and 5 APCAs. Marisa is considered by Rolling Stone Brasil to be the second greatest singer, behind only Elis Regina. She also has two albums (MM and Verde, Anil, Amarelo, Cor-de-Rosa e Carvão) on the list of the 100 best albums of Brazilian music.

== Biography ==
Monte was born in Rio de Janeiro, daughter of the engineer Carlos Saboia Monte and Sylvia Marques de Azevedo Monte. On her father's side, she is descended from the Saboias, one of the oldest Italian families in Brazil. She studied singing, piano, and drums as a child, and began studying opera singing at 14.

At the age of 19, Monte went to Italy to study bel canto, while also performing Brazilian music in bars and clubs, leading her to meet famous producer Nelson Motta. Upon her return to Rio in 1987, Motta produced her live concert, where Monte became a hybrid of MPB diva and pop rock performer. While most of her music is in the style of modern MPB, she has also recorded traditional samba and folk tunes, largely in collaboration with such musicians and songwriters as Carlinhos Brown, Arnaldo Antunes, and Nando Reis and producer Arto Lindsay. She has also collaborated with the New York pop music vanguard, including Laurie Anderson, David Byrne, Marc Ribot, Bernie Worrell and Philip Glass.

=== Career ===
In 1988, Monte signed with EMI and took the opportunity of Rede Manchete wanting a TV special covering her live concert to release it as the LP and VHS MM in 1989, a critical and commercial success pushed by the single "Bem Que Se Quis", a Motta-penned Portuguese version of Pino Daniele's "E Po' Che Fa'".

Monte owns the rights to all of her songs; it was her chief demand for renewing her contract with EMI Music.

Her 2008 single "Não é Proibido" was used in the soundtrack of a video game by EA Sports, 2010 FIFA World Cup South Africa.

== Discography ==
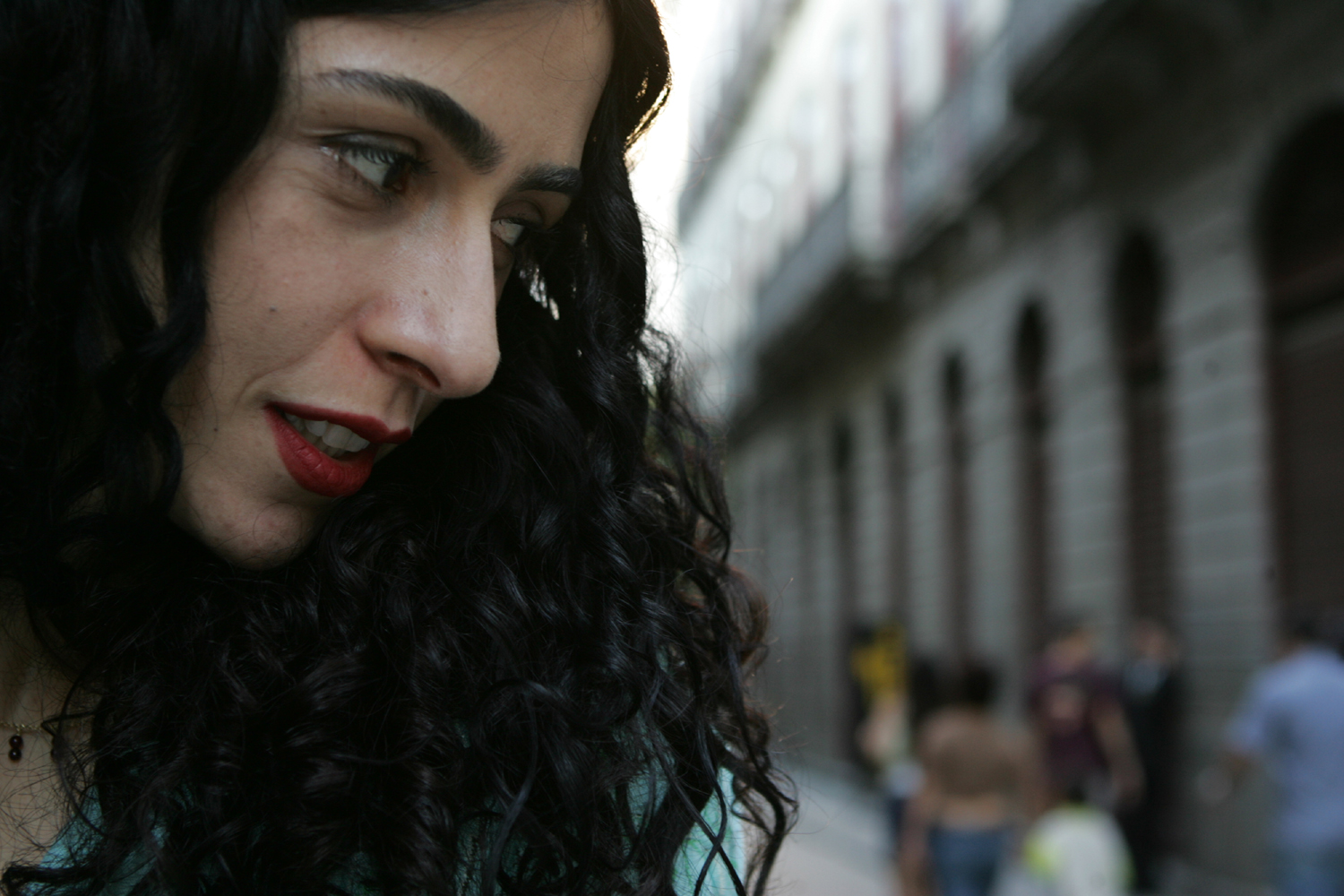
Marisa Monte

Album title	Album details	Peak chart positions				
Album title	Album details	BRA	FRA	ITA	POR	SUI
Mais	Released: 1991; Label: EMI; Format: CD, LP; Sales: 710,000	1	—	—	—	—
Verde, Anil, Amarelo, Cor-de-Rosa e Carvão	Released: 1994; Label: EMI; Format: CD, LP; Sales: 1,050,000	1	—	—	—	—
Barulhinho Bom	Released: 1996; Label: EMI; Format: CD; Sales: 750,000	1	—	—	—	—
Memórias, Crônicas, e Declaracões de Amor	Released: 9 May 2000; Label: EMI; Format: CD; Sales: 2,000,000	1	—	—	—	—
Tribalistas (with Carlinhos Brown and Arnaldo Antunes)	Released: 22 November 2002; Label: EMI; Format: CD; Sales: 3,500,000	1	39	2	1	90
Infinito Particular	Released: 10 March 2006; Label: EMI; Format: CD; Sales: 500,000	1	—	—	7	—
Universo ao Meu Redor	Released: 10 March 2006; Label: EMI; Format: CD; Sales: 500,000	2	161	—	9	—
O Que Você Quer Saber de Verdade	Released: 31 October 2011; Label: EMI; Format: CD, download digital; Sales: 260,000	2	—	—	8	—
Tribalistas (with Carlinhos Brown and Arnaldo Antunes)	Released: 25 August 2017; Label: Universal Music; Format: CD, download digital; Sales: 50,000	1	67	30	2	—
Portas	Released: 1 July 2021; Label: Sony Music Entertainment; Format: download digital	1	20	32	6	—

=== Live albums ===
Album title	Album details	Peak chart positions	
Album title	Album details	BRA	POR
MM	Released: 1989; Label: EMI; Format: CD, LP; Sales: 700,000	1	—
Verdade Uma Ilusão	Released: 16 May 2014; Label: Universal Music; Format: CD, download digital; Sales: 100,000	1	18

=== Compilation albums ===
Album title	Album details	Peak chart positions	
Album title	Album details	BRA	POR
Coleção	Released: 29 April 2016; Label: Universal Music; Format: CD, download digital; Sales: 40,000	1	10

=== Video albums ===
Album title	Album details	Peak chart positions	
Album title	Album details	BRA	POR
MM ao Vivo	Released: 1989; Label: EMI; Format: VHS, DVD	1	—
Mais	Released: 1991; Label: EMI; Format: VHS, DVD	1	—
Barulhinho Bom - Uma Viagem Musical	Released: 1997; Label: EMI; Format: VHS, DVD	1	—
Memórias, Crônicas, e Declarações de Amor	Released: 2001; Label: EMI; Format: VHS, DVD	1	—
Tribalistas (with Carlinhos Brown and Arnaldo Antunes)	Released: 22 November 2002; Label: EMI; Format: VHS, DVD	1	29
Infinito ao Meu Redor	Released: 7 November 2008; Label: EMI; Format: DVD	1	—
Verdade, Uma Ilusão	Released: 16 May 2014; Label: Universal Music; Format: DVD, Blu-ray	2	—

== Personal life ==
Monte endorsed the Lula da Silva 2026 presidential campaign in the 2026 general election.
