= Carlinhos Brown =

Brazilian musician

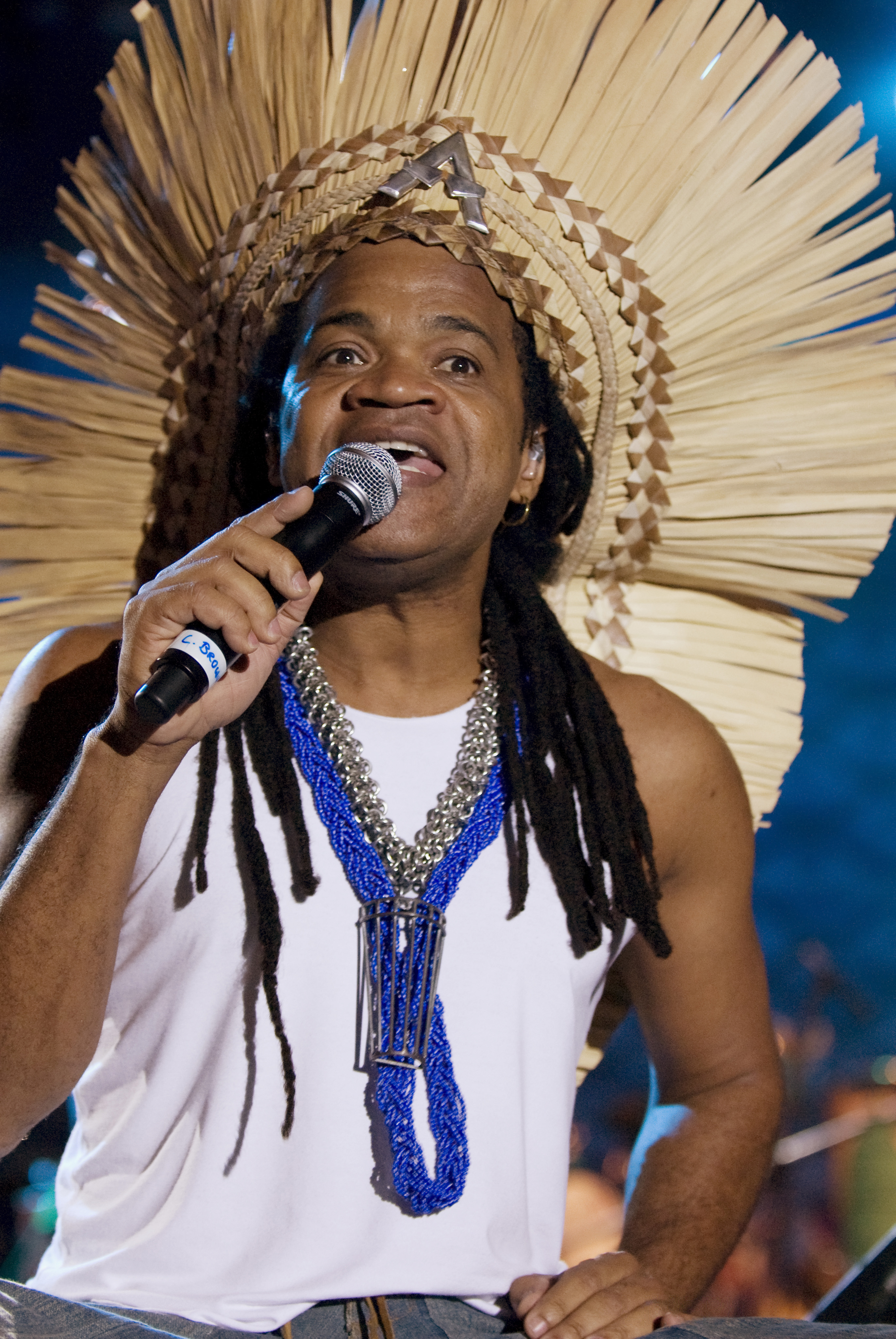
- Brown in 2007

Background information
- Born: Antônio Carlos Santos de Freitas; 23 November 1962 (age 63); Salvador, Bahia, Brazil
- Genres: Funk, Latin music, soul music
- Occupations: Singer, musician
- Website: www.carlinhosbrown.com.br

Antônio Carlos Santos de Freitas, known professionally as Carlinhos Brown (Brazilian Portuguese: /kaʁˈlĩɲus bɾaw̃, -iɲuʃ/, 23 November 1962), is a Brazilian singer, percussionist, and record producer from Salvador, Bahia. His musical style blends funk, latin music, R&B, soul music, reggae, and traditional Brazilian percussion.

In 2012, he competed for an Oscar with the song "Real in Rio", the result of a partnership with Sérgio Mendes for the soundtrack of the film Rio. Among the various awards received throughout his career, a Goya Award, two Latin Grammys and 8 nominations stand out, in addition to the trophy given in recognition of his work as an art educator by ISME - International Society of Musical Education.

== Early life ==
He was born in Candeal Pequeno, a neighborhood in the Brotas area of Salvador da Bahia, Brazil, to Renato and Madalena. In 1967 he was still a child when Caetano Veloso and Gilberto Gil, two 25-year-old musicians from Bahia, started Tropicália, which would radically change Brazilian music.

Osvaldo Alves da Silva, his mentor, introduced him to Brazilian folklore.

== Musical career ==
=== Early years ===
Brown learned to play various percussion instruments as he grew up and in the 1980s he began to collaborate with other artists. In 1984 he played with Luís Caldas's band Accordes Verdes, one of the originators of samba-reggae. In 1985, Luís Caldas recorded "Visão de Cíclope", composed by Carlinhos Brown, and it became one of the hottest songs on Salvador's radio stations. Following this, he composed "Remexer", "O Côco" and "É Difícil" for other artists, and in 1989 he formed part of Caetano Veloso's band on the record Estrangeiro, penning a song, "Meia Lua Inteira", that was very successful in Brazil and outside the country. earning him a Caymmi trophy, one of the most important music awards in Bahía, and led to his participation in world tours with João Gilberto, Djavan, and João Bosco.

=== Timbalada ===
In the late 1980s Brown started to form percussion ensembles to unite the people in his hometown. He simply gathered people in the streets and taught them basic percussion patterns. Candeal is a town whose residents share deep roots in Candomblé, a religion African slaves brought to Brazil. The customs and ceremonies shared in this religion brought a lot of drumming into the everyday lives of those living in Candeal. Carlinhos realized this enriched culture was an opportunity for growth. Eventually this gathering of peoples grew into a band called Timbalada which became so popular along with the other band he composed of Candeal residents – Vai Quem Vem (Who Comes, Goes)- that he had to build a concert stadium to hold all the people who came into town to watch them practice. Timbalada recorded eight albums and toured various countries around the world. Billboard magazine named their debut album the "best record produced in Latin America in 1993". Many of the proceeds went towards fixing up the streets of Candeal by repaving roads and renovating houses.

In 1992, Brown appeared on several songs on the album Ritual Beating System by the project Bahia Black. Organized by prolific producer Bill Laswell, Bahia Black brought together Brazilian musicians with American jazz players. Also in 1992, Brown composed and performed songs for Sergio Mendes's Brasileiro album, his songs for that album including "Fanfarra", "Magalenha" and "Indiado".

=== Solo career ===
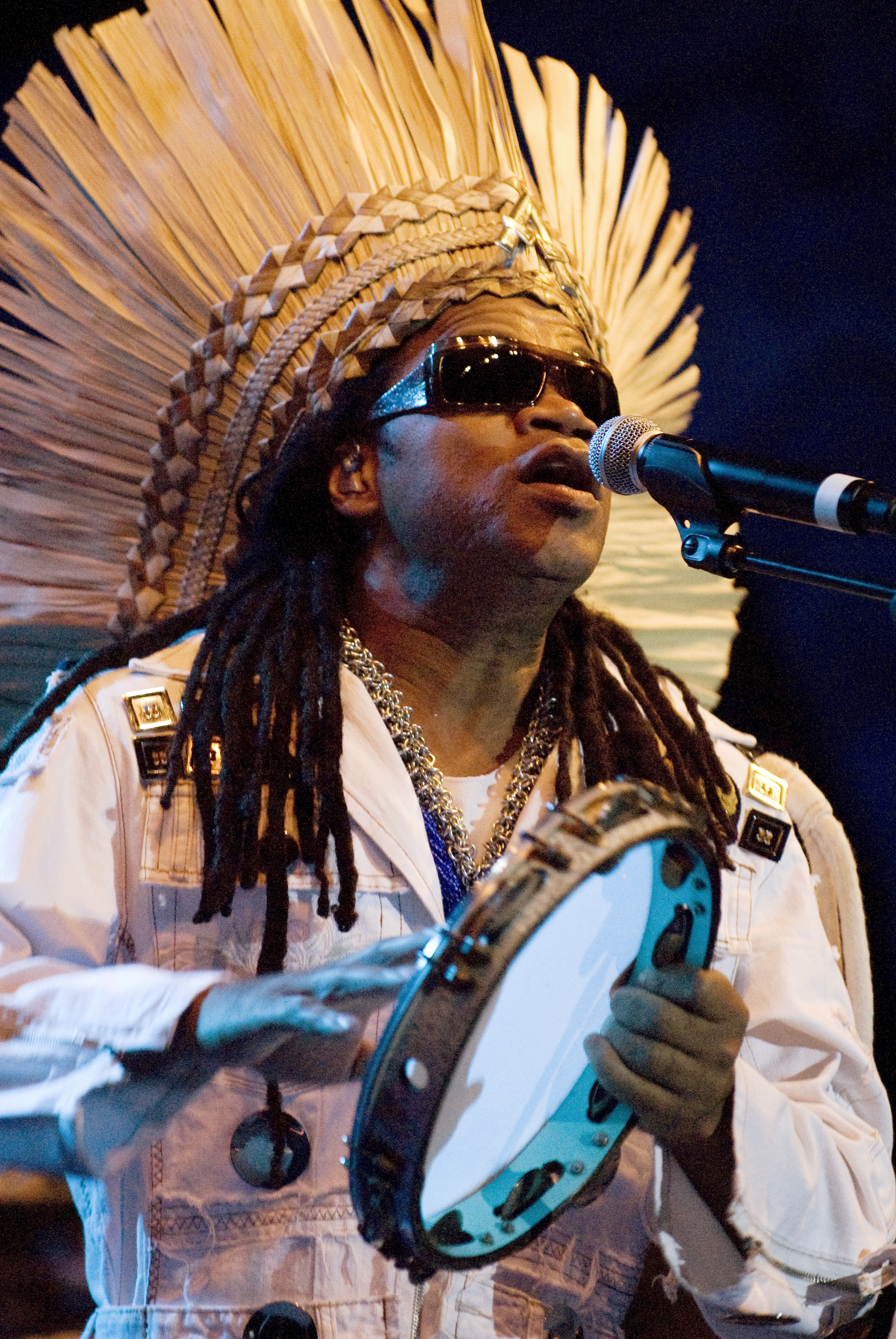
Carlinhos Brown in 2007

On the heels of Timbalada's success, in 1996 Brown released a solo album called Alfagamabetizado, on which he sang, composed, and played the instruments. That year also saw Brown appearing on the album Roots by the Brazilian metal band Sepultura.

In 1997, Brown made a cameo appearance performing the song "A Namorada" (The Girlfriend) in the 1997 American film Speed 2: Cruise Control, and appeared on the film's soundtrack. He also appeared in a Brazilian movie, Navalha na Carne (Razor in the Flesh).

In 1998, he collaborated with Bonga and Marisa Monte on the track "Mulemba Xangola" for the AIDS benefit compilation album Onda Sonora: Red Hot + Lisbon produced by the Red Hot Organization.

Brown's second album, Omelete Man, was released in 1998, and was followed by a third album, Bahia do Mundo, Mito e Verdade, in 2001.

In 2001, Brown had an infamous appearance at the Rock in Rio festival. Along with his music not being embraced by a crowd of mostly Guns N' Roses fans, Brown ordered to shut down the firehoses that sprayed the audience with water in the preceding performance by Pato Fu to alleviate the intense Rio de Janeiro heat, making the displeased concertgoers throw water bottles at him during the entire concert.

He released Carlinhos Brown É Carlito Marrón in 2003 and collaborated with DJ Dero on the 2004 album Candyall Beat. The Carlito Marrón album achieved considerable success in Spain, where it was repackaged a year later with extra tracks, achieving a hit single "Maria Caipirinha" (with DJ Dero) on the Spanish charts in 2004. Carlinhos Brown remains active in the Salvador da Bahía community, founding the Pracatum Music School in the Candeal neighborhood in 1994 as a non-profit organization dedicated to education, cultural, and community development programs in the city, including a professional music school. In addition, he has his own recording label, Candyall Records. Brown has also begun painting, and his art works have been well received.

On 10 April 2007, Carlinhos' album A Gente Ainda Não Sonhou was released by SonyBMG. It was recorded in Salvador de Bahia between March 2005 and September 2006. Two songs were co-written with Marisa Monte and Arnaldo Antunes.

Carlinhos Brown is extensively featured in the 2004 documentary El Milagro de Candeal. The title is translated as "The Miracle of Candeal" and features the influence and transformation Brown has done for Candeal. What was once considered a dangerous shanty town is now seen as colorful music town.

In 2011, he collaborated with Los Van Van to record the track "Soy Loco Por Tí, América" for the Red Hot Organization's most recent charitable album Red Hot + Rio 2. The album is a follow-up to the 1996 Red Hot + Rio. Proceeds from the sales will be donated to raise awareness and money to fight AIDS/HIV and related health and social issues. More recently, he was featured in Shakira's song "LA LA LA" which was the kick off song for the 2014 World Cup in Rio.

From 2012 to 2023, Carlinhos Brown was selected to be a judge in The Voice Brasil (Season 1), a reality talent show. His role as a judge continued consecutively for nine years. He has also been a judge on the spinoff show, The Voice Kids, throughout its eight seasons.

=== Tribalistas ===
In 2002 he formed the group Tribalistas with Arnaldo Antunes and Marisa Monte, contributing vocals and drums to their self-titled album Os Tribalistas. Their single "Já Sei Namorar" became the number-one song on Brazilian radio stations, and their second single "Velha Infância" met with almost equal success. The album spawned two more hits in Brazil:, "Passe em Casa", co-written with Margareth Menezes, and "É Você". In 2003, Tribalistas won the Best Album, Best DVD, and Best Song (for "Já Sei Namorar") awards from the Multishow of Brazilian Music.

=== Social activism ===
Carlinhos established the Pracatum School or otherwise known as the Pracatum Project in 1994. Having established a name for himself, he wanted to do more than just write powerful lyrics, he wanted to help his hometown and the children, whom like him, had high hopes with such little resources. The proceeds of this school along with Timbalada went towards improving health reforms, urban development such as paving the streets that once had overflowing sewer water, and renovating unfinished housing projects.

== Family ==
He and Raquel Machado (also Raquel Jacobs) have a daughter born in 1990. His current wife is Helena Buarque and they have four children together born in 1996, 1998, 2006 and 2009. He has a son born in 1997 from another relationship.

== Discography ==
- 1996 Alfagamabetizado (Blue Note)
- 1998 Omelete Man (Blue Note)
- 2001 Bahia do Mundo, Mito e Verdade (Blue Note)
- 2003 Carlinhos Brown é Carlito Marrón (Blue Note)
- 2004 Candyall Beat (Vale)
- 2007 A Gente Ainda Não Sonhou (Sony BMG)
- 2010 Adobró (Sony BMG)
- 2010 Diminuto (Sony BMG)
- 2012 Mixturada Brasileira
- 2014 Marabó
- 2014 Vibraaasil
- 2015 Sarau du Brown
- 2016 ‘’Artefireaccua’’
- 2017 ‘’Semelhantes’’
- 2020 ‘’Axé Inventions’’
- 2020 ‘’Umbalista’’
- 2020 ‘’Carlinhos Brown Kids e Paxuá e Paramim’’
- 2022 ‘’Sim.Zas’’
- 2022 ‘’ElectroTribalistas’’
- 2023 ‘’Pop Xiré’’

== Awards and nominations ==
Year	Awards	Category	Recipient	Outcome	Ref.					
2001	Latin Grammy	Best Brazilian Song	Amor I Love You performed by Marisa Monte	Nominated						
2003	Latin Grammy	Best Brazilian Contemporary Pop Album	Tribalistas	Won						
2003	Latin Grammy	Best Brazilian Song	Já Sei Namorar performed by Tribalistas	Nominated						
2003	Latin Grammy	Record Of The Year	Já Sei Namorar performed by Tribalistas	Nominated						
2003	Latin Grammy	Album Of The Year	Tribalistas	Nominated						
2004	Latin Grammy	Best Brazilian Contemporary Pop Album	Carlinhos Brown Es Carlito Marrón	Won						
2004	Goya Award	Best Brazilian Contemporary Pop Album	Carlinhos Brown Es Carlito Marrón	Won		2006	Latin Grammy	Best Original Song	"Zambie Mameto"	Won
2007	Latin Grammy	Best Brazilian Contemporary Pop Album	A Gente Ainda Não Sonhou	Nominated						
2012	Academy Awards	Best Original Song	Real in Rio	Nominated						
2012	Annie Awards	Music in a Feature Production	Rio	Nominated						
2012	Black Reel Awards	Best Original or Adapted Song	Fly Love	Nominated						

Carlinhos Brown was also honoured in 2003 with a Prince Claus Award, under that year's theme "The Survival and Innovation of Crafts".
