= Arnaldo Antunes =

Brazilian writer and musician (born 1960)

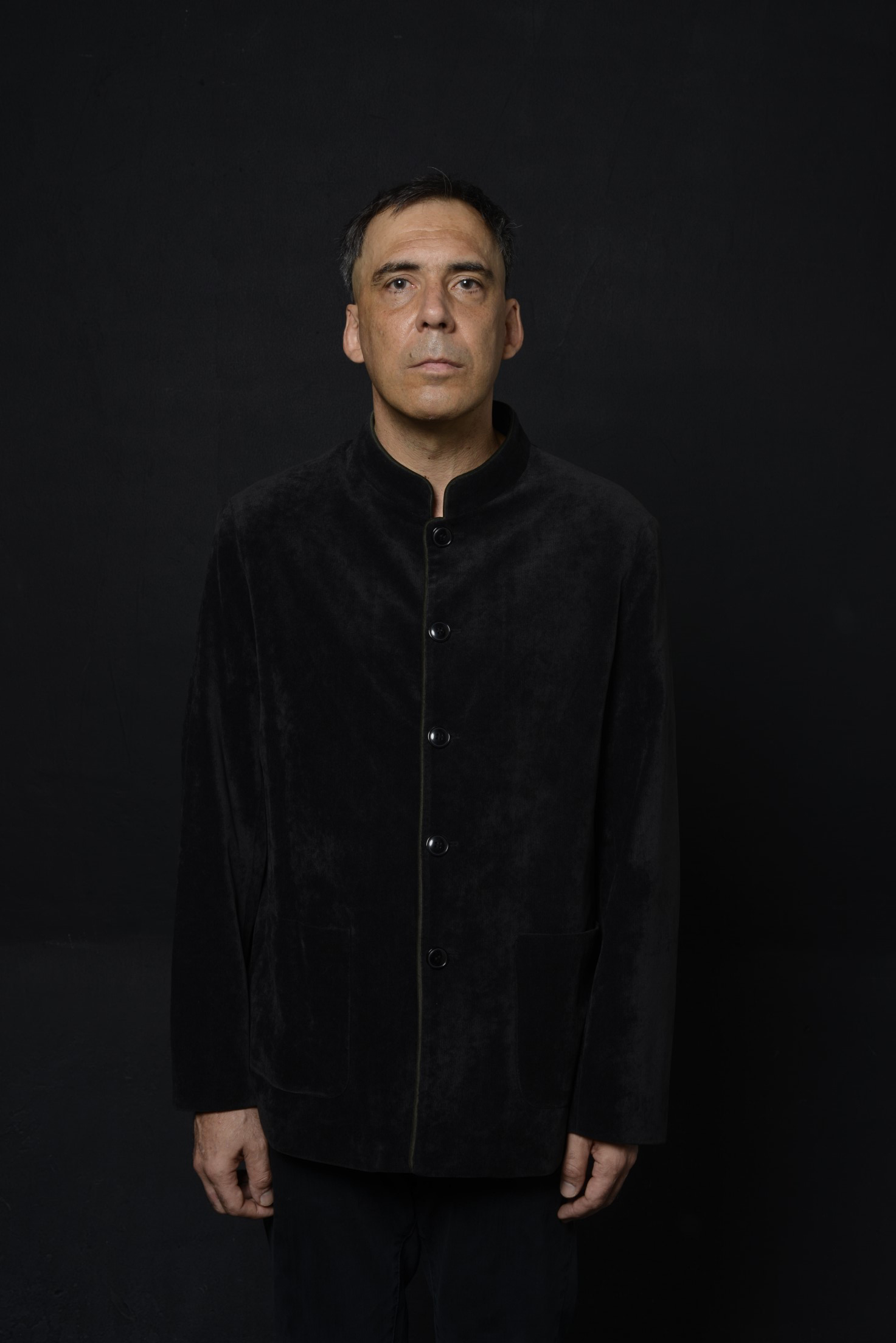
- Antunes in 2015

Background information
- Born: Arnaldo Augusto Nora Antunes Filho; September 2, 1960 (age 66); São Paulo, São Paulo, Brazil
- Genres: MPB, rock, Brazilian rock, pop rock, post-punk, punk rock
- Occupations: Singer, composer, poet, movie producer
- Instruments: Vocals; guitar; keyboards
- Years active: 1984–present
- Labels: Rosa Celeste; Sony Music
- Formerly of: Pequeno Cidadão; Tribalistas; Titãs; Vestidos de Espaço
- Website: arnaldoantunes.com.br

Arnaldo Antunes (pronounced [aʁˈnawdu ɐ̃ˈtunis]; born Arnaldo Augusto Nora Antunes Filho, 2 September 1960) is a Brazilian singer, writer, and composer. He was a member of the rock band Titãs, which he co-founded in 1982 and left ten years later. After 1992, he embarked on a solo career. He has published poetry and had his first book published in 1983. He has worked with Marisa Monte, Tribalistas, Carlinhos Brown and Pequeno Cidadão.

== Childhood ==
Arnaldo was born on September 2, 1960, to Arnaldo Augusto Nora Antunes and Dora Leme Ferreira. He was the fourth of seven children. In 1967, he enrolled in Luís de Camões school and studied there until 1972. During the following year, he attended PUC SP, where he first got involved with the local art scene. In 1975 he met Paulo Miklos, a classmate at Colégio Equipe. In 1978, he went to study Portuguese and literature at USP.

== Career with Titãs ==
In 1979, Antunes formed his first band, Banda Performática, with his then-wife. In 1982, Titãs do Iê-Iê was formed, with Antunes as a founder. In 1984, they release their self-titled debut album. In 1992, Antunes decided to leave Titãs, after recording seven albums with the band, due to musical differences. His departure was announced on 15 December 1992.

On 13 November 1985, he was arrested for heroin trafficking after the police found 128 mg of the drug in his apartment in São Paulo. The officers arrived there after arresting his Titãs bandmate Tony Bellotto, who was found with 30 mg in a taxi after leaving Antunes's place. Due to the quantity that Antunes had at home, he was accused of trafficking while Bellotto was only charged with possession. Antunes had bought the drug at the Rose Bom Bom nightclub, with money from a performance at a show organized by Fernando Henrique Cardoso's campaign; he was then running for mayor of São Paulo. At the precinct, he was put in an individual cell, since the sheriff considered imprudent to put him among 90 dangerous robbers.

== Solo career ==
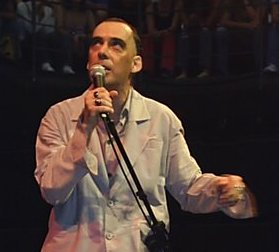
Antunes at the São Paulo Cultural Center in São Paulo 2007.

In 1993 he released his solo debut album Nome, a "multimedia project associating poetry and music", featuring João Donato, Marisa Monte and Arto Lindsay as guest stars, and short computer animation features (produced in collaboration with Celia Catunda, Kiko Mistrorigo and Zaba Moreau). The Nome video was shown in art venues and festivals in Brazil, Italy, Argentina, Australia, Switzerland, Germany, Austria, France, Spain (where it received a Jury recommendation at the Festival International de Video Cidade de Vigo 1995), Netherlands, Monaco, Uruguay, Cuba, Chile, Colombia and the US (receiving an honorable mention at the first annual New York Video Festival).

As a solo artist, Arnaldo Antunes later released Ninguém (1995), O Silêncio (1996), Um Som (1998), Paradeiro (2001) and Saiba (Rosa Celeste/BMG 2004). He also released other albums in special projects, such as O Corpo (1999), a specially produced soundtrack for Grupo Corpo, a dance company from Minas Gerais, and the album Os Tribalistas (EMI/Phonomotor 2002), a collaborative project with Marisa Monte and Carlinhos Brown.

His compositions have been used in the soundtrack of several films, including Blue in the Face, directed by Wayne Wang and Paul Auster; Bicho de Sete Cabeças, directed by Lais Bodanzki; Dois Perdidos Numa Noite Suja, adapted from a novel by Plínio Marcos and directed by José Joffily; and Benjamim, adapted from a novel by Chico Buarque and directed by Monique Gardenberg.

His album A Curva da Cintura, a collaboration with Ira! guitarist Edgard Scandurra and Toumani Diabaté from Mali, achieved a number 5 in the World Music Charts Europe in August 2012.

His album RSTUVXZ was ranked as the 16th best Brazilian album of 2018 by the Brazilian edition of Rolling Stone magazine.

In 2020, humoristic group Porta dos Fundos released a new version of "A Marcha do Demo" by Vestidos de Espaço (supergroup of which Antunes was a part of) with Antunes on vocals in order to promote their Christmas special Teocracia em Vertigem. The version received a video in which Antunes is seen singing in studio and the Porta dos Fundos members are seen singing under social distancing. Making-of footage is also shown.

== Personal life ==
From 1980 to 1987, he was married to Go. Right after they broke up, he married Zaba Moreau, with whom he had four children:

== Discography ==
=== With Titãs ===
- Titãs (1984)
- Televisão (1985)
- Cabeça Dinossauro (1986)
- Jesus não Tem Dentes no País dos Banguelas (1987)
- Õ Blésq Blom (1989)
- Tudo Ao Mesmo Tempo Agora (1991)
- Titanomaquia (1993, only on "Disneylândia", "Hereditário" and "De Olhos Fechados", as a guest songwriter)
- Domingo (1995, only on "Tudo em Dia", as a guest songwriter)
- Acústico MTV (1997, only on "O Pulso", as a guest singer)
- Volume Dois (1998, only on "Senhora e Senhor" and "Era Uma Vez", as a guest songwriter)
- A Melhor Banda de Todos os Tempos da Última Semana (2001, only on "Cuidado Com Você", as a guest songwriter)
- Como Estão Vocês? (2003, only on "Esperando Atravessar a Rua", as a guest songwriter)
- Paralamas e Titãs Juntos e Ao Vivo (2008, only on "Comida" and "Lugar Nenhum", as a guest singer)
- Sacos Plásticos (2009, only on "Problema", as a guest songwriter)
- Nheengatu (2014, only on "Cadáver Sobre Cadáver", as a guest songwriter)

=== Solo ===
- Nome (1993)
- Ninguém (1995)
- O Silêncio (1996)
- Um Som (1998)
- Focus – O Essencial de Arnaldo Antunes (1999)
- O Corpo (2000)
- Paradeiro (2001)
- Saiba (2004)
- Qualquer (2006)
- Ao Vivo em Estúdio (2007)
- Iê Iê Iê (2009)
- Pequeno Cidadão (2009)
- Acústico MTV – Arnaldo Antunes (2012)
- Disco (2013)
- Já é (2016)
- Novo Mundo (2025)

=== Collaborations ===
- A Curva da Cintura (with Edgard Scandurra and Toumani Diabaté, 2011)
- Lágrimas no Mar (with Vítor Araújo, 2021)

=== Guest appearances ===
- Golpe de Estado – Forçando a Barra (1988)
- Theo Werneck – Leite Materno (1990)
- Various artists - Rock de Autor (1991)
- Péricles Cavalcanti – Sobre as Ondas (1995)
- Various artists – O Triângulo Sem Bermudas (1996)
- Edgard Scandurra – Benzina (1996)
- Tom Zé and Zé Miguel Wisnik – Parabelo – Grupo Corpo (1997)
- Tom Zé – Com Defeito de Fabricação (1998)
- Onda Sonora: Red Hot + Lisbon (1998)
- João Donato – Songbook (1999)
- Various artists – Tributo a Cazuza (1999)
- Chico Buarque – Songbook (1999)
- Suba – São Paulo Confessions (2000)
- Zé Miguel Wisnik – São Paulo Rio (2000)
- Marisa Monte – Memórias, Crônicas e Declarações de Amor (2000)
- Walter Franco – Tutano (2001)
- Lula Queiroga – Aboiando a Vaca Mecânica (2001)
- Unknown artist – Só Um é Muito Só (2001)
- Glauco Matoso – Melopéia – Sonetos Musicados (2001)
- Cid Campos – No Lago do Olho (2001)
- Aguilar e Banda Performática – Aguilar e Banda Performática (2001)
- Various artists – Superfantástico – Quando eu Era Pequeno (2002)
- Ortinho – Ilha do Destino (2002)
- João Donato – O Melhor de João Donato (2002)
- Aldo Brizzi – Brizzi do Brasil (2002)
- Various artists – Maysa Esta Chama Que Não Vai Passar (2007)
- Various artists – Pequeno Cidadão (2009)
- Nando Reis - Jardim-Pomar (2016, vocals on "Azul de Presunto")
- Paulo Miklos - A Gente Mora no Agora (2017, songwriting on "Deixar de Ser Alguém")

== Bibliography as a writer ==
- Ou e (visual poem album) (1983)
- Psia (1986)
- Tudos (1990)
- As coisas (1992), Winner of the 1992 Jabuti Awards for Poetry
- 2 ou + Corpos no mesmo Espaço (1997)
- Doble Duplo (selection, translation and art by Ivan Larraguibel), (2000)
- 40 Escritos (organized by João Bandeira) (2000)
- Outro (2001)
- Palavra Desordem (2002)
- ET Eu Tu (2003)
- Antologia (Portugal only) (2006)
- Frases do Tomé aos Três Anos (a collection of illustrations of the first sentences said by his son) (2006)
- Como É que Chama o Nome Disso (2006)
- Melhores Poemas (2010)
- n.d.a. (2010)
- Animais (2011)
- Cultura (2012)
- Saiba (2013)
- Outros 40 (2014)
- Agora aqui ninguém precisa de si (2015)Winner of Prêmio Jabuti.
- Família (2015), co-written with Tony Bellotto
