= Los 600 de Latinoamérica =

List of Latin American music albums

Los 600 de Latinoamérica. 600 discos 1920–2022 (The 600 from Latin America. 600 Albums 1920–2022) is a list of 600 music albums from Latin America, compiled by a group of music journalists and communicators from the region, and includes music from all countries, eras, and genres of recorded music, to celebrate Latin identity, according to the project's introduction. The list, created as an independent initiative, was published on the project's website from April 2024 to July 2024.

== Context ==
In 2021, following an interaction between Jorge Cárcamo and Cristofer Rodríguez (co-author of the book 200 Discos de Rock Chileno), both from Chile, they compiled essential albums for Latin America of the 20th century. Subsequently, a group of music journalists and academics from different countries in the region shaped the list of 600 albums that would cover all times of recorded history through discussions and internal voting over a period of nearly three years. According to the credits, a total of 19 people participated in the list, which includes the editorial determination of positions, selection of the 600 albums, curation, texts, and web design, hailing from Chile, Argentina, Mexico, Peru, Colombia, El Salvador, Brazil, the Dominican Republic, Guatemala, and Venezuela.

== Content ==
The list includes music recorded from the beginnings of the recording industry in Latin America in the 1920s (although the oldest album included in the list dates back to 1937) to albums released in 2022. It encompasses a wide variety of musical genres, ranging from rock, pop, rap, and electronic music to distinctively Latin American genres such as MPB, bossa nova, salsa, cumbia, tango, ranchera, norteña, vallenato, merengue, bachata, huayno, and various traditional music styles. Albums from all Hispanic American countries, Brazil, and the Latino communities in the United States are included.

== Reception ==
Billboard Magazine highlighted that the album "Re" by the Mexican band Café Tacvba, on its 30th anniversary, has received critical acclaim as follows: "To date, it has received accolades from major media outlets like The New York Times, BBC Music, Rolling Stone, and AllMusic, and was ranked No. 3 on the 'Los 600 de Latinoamérica' list compiled by a collective of music journalists earlier this decade, highlighting the top 600 Latin American albums from 1920 to 2022."

The Polish media outlet Beehype features an article by journalist José Luis Mercado, who was part of the project, stating: "The focus of the project is to celebrate Latin identity and its musical history, and it has mostly received positive reactions from the public, who appreciate the representation of Latin American music in such an exhaustive format. However, the organizers acknowledge that the list is also subject to criticism and debate, which they consider a valuable part of the process."

Dianna Rosa Pérez from the Cuban media outlet AM:PM highlights: "It was not like 'drinking a glass of water.' When deciding which albums would remain, the team in charge of the selection acknowledged the impossibility of including all of them, given the number and complexity of most genres. On the other hand, the fundamental idea was not to create an encyclopedic list or to generate a narrowly intellectual vision."

== List ==
=== Albums of the top 30 ===
Position	Title	Year	Artist	Country
1	Siembra	1978	Willie Colón & Rubén Blades	United States / Panama
2	Las últimas composiciones	1966	Violeta Parra	Chile
3	Re	1994	Café Tacvba	Mexico
4	"Al final de este viaje..."	1978	Silvio Rodríguez	Cuba
5	Construção	1971	Chico Buarque	Brazil
6	Clics Modernos	1983	Charly García	Argentina
7	Chega de saudade	1959	João Gilberto	Brazil
8	Son Con Guaguancó	1966	Celia Cruz	Cuba
9	En el Palacio de Bellas Artes	1990	Juan Gabriel	Mexico
10	Dónde Están los Ladrones?	1998	Shakira	Colombia
11	Buena Vista Social Club	1997	Buena Vista Social Club	Cuba
12	Mercedes Sosa en Argentina	1982	Mercedes Sosa	Argentina
13	Buscando América	1984	Rubén Blades & Seis del Solar	Panama
14	Hasta la Raíz	2015	Natalia Lafourcade	Mexico
15	El Abayarde	2002	Tego Calderón	Puerto Rico
16	Adiós Nonino	1959	Astor Piazzolla & His Quintet	Argentina
17	Nuevo Ritmo...!	1966	Los Corraleros de Majagual	Colombia
18	Amor Prohibido	1994	Selena	United States
19	Ojalá que llueva café	1989	Juan Luis Guerra	Dominican Republic
20	Tarimba Negra	1978	Chabuca Granda	Peru
21	Canción Animal	1990	Soda Stereo	Argentina
22	Acabou Chorare	1972	Novos Baianos	Brazil
23	Alturas de Macchu Picchu	1981	Los Jaivas	Chile
24	Amor (Great Love Songs in Spanish)	1964	Eydie Gormé & Los Panchos	United States / Mexico
25	Rosa	1958	Agustín Lara	Mexico
26	Chavela Vargas	1961	Chavela Vargas	Costa Rica / Mexico
27	Samba Esquema Novo	1963	Jorge Ben	Brazil
28	Los Destellos	1968	Los Destellos	Peru
29	Camino del Indio	1955	Atahualpa Yupanqui	Argentina
30	Tonadas	1974	Simón Díaz	Venezuela
