= Nacho Paredes =

Colombian singer and songwriter

- Also known as: El Cumbiambero de América
- Born: Miguel Ignacio Núñez Paredes; 2 May 1935; Ovejas, Colombia
- Died: 11 August 2018 (aged 83) Sincelejo, Colombia
- Spouse: Nely Barboza

Miguel Ignacio Núñez Paredes (Note: In this Spanish name, the first or paternal surname is Núñez and the second or maternal family name is Paredes.) (1935–2018), known as Nacho Paredes, was a Colombian singer and songwriter. He was an early member of Los Corraleros de Majagual, who had a hit with his composition "La Cumbiamberita", and he later led several of his own groups.

== Biography ==
=== Early life ===
Paredes was born on 2 May 1935 in Don Gabriel, a corregimiento of Ovejas, in the Colombian department of Sucre. He started singing boleros as a child, and won a singing contest run by Radio Sincelejo.

=== Music career ===
Crescencio Salcedo encouraged Paredes to start singing Colombian styles, and took him to sing with Edmundo Arias' orchestra. Paredes was an early member of Los Corraleros de Majagual in the 1960s, alongside Alfredo Gutiérrez, Lisandro Meza, Chico Cervantes, Eliseo Herrera, and others. Los Corraleros had a hit with Paredes' song "La Cumbiamberita", his best-known composition. Other notable songs written by Paredes include "Caballito de Palo", "Sabor de Cumbia", "Cumbia Maya", "Tatuaje Vallenato", and "El Negrito Piropero".

Paredes founded several bands, including El Combo de Oro, Los Dinámicos de Nacho, Los Sabaneros de Sucre, and Los Vaqueros Sabaneros. In Mexico he sang with La Luz Roja de San Marcos, and in the United States he led the group Nacho Paredes y Café. He also sang backing vocals for vallenato groups Los Hermanos López and Los Hermanos Zuleta. His nickname "El Cumbiambero de América" came from his being involved in so many groups in various countries of the American continent.

=== Personal life and death ===
Paredes was married to his wife Nely Barboza for 48 years. He died of prostate cancer at his home in Sincelejo on 11 August 2018.
