= Nuevo Ritmo...! =

Studio album by Los Corraleros de Majagual
- Released: 1966
- Length: 31:32
- Label: Discos Fuentes

Los Corraleros de Majagual chronology
Señora Bonita (1965)	Nuevo Ritmo...! (1966)	¡Nos Fuimos! (1966)

Nuevo Ritmo...! is a studio album by Colombian musical group Los Corraleros de Majagual, released in 1966 on the Discos Fuentes label. In Los 600 de Latinoamérica, a 2024 ranking of the 600 greatest Latin American albums by music critics and academics, Nuevo Ritmo...! was ranked No. 17, with critic José Luis Mercado calling it a "milestone in Colombian music" that "established a standard of quality and creativity that remains revered in tropical music in Latin America to this day."

== Recording and release ==
Nuevo Ritmo...! was released by Medellín record label Discos Fuentes in 1966. It was the first album by Los Corraleros de Majagual following the departure of founding member Alfredo Gutiérrez to pursue a solo career on record label Sonolux. Trumpeter Manuel Cervantes took over leadership of the band, while Gutiérrez was replaced on accordion by Lisandro Meza, who, alongside bassist Julio Ernesto Estrada (Fruko), introduced bass guitar to the Corraleros for the first time notably on hit track "La Burrita". José Luis Mercado wrote that the use of the bass "not only modernized the sound of Los Corraleros, but also contributed to the development of the [tropical] genre."

The first side of the record is a medley, including songs written by members of the band as well as covers of hits like Spanish Flea, which had been made famous by Herb Alpert.

== Cover ==
Jaime Andrés Monsalve criticised the cover of the album, writing that it "speaks to the limited resources available in the photographic studio and of the eternal stereotype of the Afro-Colombian hitting the leather." Ana Cecilia Calle suggests that images of Afro-Colombians were used on the covers of Colombian tropical music albums as a means of authenticating the Caribbean rhythms to mestizo audiences.

== Track listing ==
Side A track listing
No.	Title	Writer(s)	Length
1.	"Las Flores Rojas"	Eliseo Herrera	1:08
2.	"La Resbalosa"	José Sosa	1:41
3.	"Mata e Caña"	Calixto Ochoa, Eliseo García	1:07
4.	"Trigueñita"	Andrés Morales	1:29
5.	"La Tombola"	Augusto Alguero	1:23
6.	"Cartagenera"	Farías Cabanillas, Noro Vanella	1:23
7.	"La Cola del Diablo"	César Castro	1:18
8.	"El Machorrito"	Calixto Ochoa	1:05
9.	"Yo Conozco a Claudia"	Julio Erazo	1:34
10.	"La Arenita"	Ceferino Nieto	1:10
11.	"Spanish Flea"	Julius Wechter	1:07
12.	"La Chichera"	Carlos Baquerizo Castro	1:16

Side B track listing
No.	Title	Writer(s)	Genre	Length
1.	"La Burrita"	Eliseo Herrera	cumbia	2:40
2.	"La Minifalda"	Calixto Ochoa	a go-go	2:28
3.	"El Bailador"	Julio Erazo	paseaito	2:46
4.	"Pompo Del "66""	Tony Zúñiga	pompo	2:41
5.	"El Vivo y El Bobo"	Eliseo Herrera	paseaito	2:35
6.	"Charanga Internacional"	Calixto Ochoa	charanga	2:39
