= Hoppo (album) =

Hoppo!

Studio album by Hoppo!
- Released: 2010
- Recorded: 2010
- Genre: Latin music, folk music, singer-songwriter, indie folk rock en español
- Length: 34:31
- Label: Self-released
- Producer: Rubén Albarrán

Hoppo! is the self-titled album from Café Tacvba frontman Rubén Albarrán. The album consists of nine cover songs. These cover songs are Nueva Canción (or "new song" in English) Latin American folk songs written by South American social activists of the 1960s, including three from Violeta Parra.

Recording of the album was done in 2010, while Albarrán was on break from Café Tacvba. The album is also a departure from the alternative rock and electronic sounds that usually comprise Café Tacvba's music.

The album has not been commercially released, and there are no immediate plans to sign with a record label. The album was only available as a promotional CD in 2010. However, the songs can be streamed through HopPo's official MySpace page.

== Track listing ==
No.	Title	Writer(s)	Length
1.	"Alfonsina y el mar"	Ariel Ramírez, Félix Luna	5.52
2.	"Canción con Todos"	Armando Tejada Gomez, Cesar Isella	4:11
3.	"Dale tu Mano al Indio"	Daniel Viglietti	2:39
4.	"Volver A Los 17"	Violeta Parra	4:04
5.	"Me Gustan los Estudiantes" (This song is listed as "Que Vivan Los Estudiantes" on HopPo's official MySpace page)	Violeta Parra	2.36
6.	"Canta tu Canción"	Ariel Ramírez, Félix Luna	3:49
7.	"Amanda" (Traditional title: "Te Recuerdo Amanda")	Víctor Jara	3:04
8.	"Zamba de Valderrama" (Traditional spelling: "Zamba De Balderrama")	Manuel J. Castilla, Gustavo "Cuchi" Leguizamon	4:30
9.	"Gracias a la Vida"	Violeta Parra	3:46
Total length:			34:31

== Personnel ==
- Rubén Albarrán – vocals
- Rodrigo "El Chino" Aros – sitar, guitar, flute, percussion
- Juan Pablo "El Muñeco" Villanueva – guitar
- Carlos Basilio
- Camilo Nu – bass guitar
- Alejandro Flores – violin
