= Mercedes Sosa en Argentina =

Live album by Mercedes Sosa
- Released: 1982
- Genre: Argentine nueva canción
- Label: Philips
- Producer: Daniel Grinbank, Fabián Matus, Mercedes Sosa

Mercedes Sosa en Argentina is a double album by Argentine singer Mercedes Sosa. It was recorded live at the Teatro Opera de Buenos Aires in February 1982 and released on the Philips label. In a 2024 ranking of the 600 greatest Latin American albums compiled by music critics, Mercedes Sosa en Argentina was ranked No. 12. In 2017, it was selected by NPR as one of the "150 Greatest Albums by Women".

== Track listing ==
Side A

1. "Soy Pan, Soy Paz, Soy Más" (Piero) [4:50]
2. "Drume Negrita" (Bola De Nieve) [5:20]
3. "Sueño Con Serpientes" (Silvio Rodríguez) [3:17]
4. "María Va" (written by and accordion, backing vocals by Antonio Tarragó Ros) [2:44]
5. "Al Jardín De La República" (Virgilio Carmona) [4:40]

Side B

1. "Gracias a la vida" (Violeta Parra) [4:50]
2. "Alfonsina y el mar" (piano by Ariel Ramirez, written by A. Ramirez, F. Luna) [5:18]
3. "El Cosechero" (accordion by Raúl Barboza, written by Ayala) [3:17]
4. "Como La Cigarra" (María Elena Walsh) [2:40]
5. "Sólo le pido a Dios" (written by, and acoustic guitar, harmonica, and backing vocals by León Gieco) [4:45]

Side C

1. "La Flor Azul" (A. R. Villar, M. A. Gallo) [3:11]
2. "Los Hermanos" (Atahualpa Yupanqui) [3:54]
3. "La Arenosa" (G. Leguizamón, M. J. Castilla) [3:03]
4. "Años" (Pablo Milanés) [3:20]
5. "Los Mareados" (bandoneon – Rodolfo Mederos) (E. Cadícamo, J. C. Cobian) [6:14]

Side D

1. "Cuando Ya Me Empiece A Quedar Solo" (written by, and piano and backing vocals by, Charly Garcia) [3:40]
2. "Volver A Los 17" (Violeta Parra) [4:48]
3. "Fuego En Anymana" (A. Tejada Gómez, C. Isella) [3:16]
4. "Polleritas" (4:32)

a. "Pollerita Colorada" (J. Espinosa)
b. "Carnavalito Del Duende" (Gustavo Leguizamón, Manuel José Castilla)
c. "Pollerita" (Raúl Shaw Moreno]

1. "Canción Con Todos" (A. Tejada Gómez, C. Isella) [4:05]

== Personnel ==
- José Luis Castiñeira De Dios - bass, guitar, arranger, and music director
- Omar Espinoza - guitar, charango
- Domingo Cura - percussion
