= Homenaje a Violeta Parra =

Studio album by Mercedes Sosa
- Released: 1971
- Genre: Argentine nueva canción
- Label: Philips Argentina

Homenaje a Violeta Parra is an album by Argentine singer Mercedes Sosa. It was released in 1971 on the Philips Argentina label. The album consists of songs written by singer-songwriter pioneer in the Nueva canción chilena idiom, Violeta Parra, who died in 1967.

In 2015, it was selected by Billboard magazine as one of the "50 Essential Latin Albums of the Last 50 Years".

== Track listing ==
Side A

1. "Defensa de Violeta" (words by Nicanor Parra) [4:50]
2. "Gracias a la vida" (Violeta Parra) [4:21]
3. "Según el favor del viento" (Violeta Parra) [3:39]
4. "Arriba quemando el sol" (Violeta Parra) [2:44]
5. "Me gustan los estudiantes" (Violeta Parra)

Side B

1. "Volver a los 17" (Violeta Parra) [5:23]
2. "La cara" (performed with Quilapayún) (Violeta Parra) [2:45]
3. "Que ha sacado con quererte" (Violeta Parra) [3:56]
4. "La lavandera" (Violeta Parra) [3:16]
5. "Rin del angelito" (Violeta Parra) [3:16]
6. "Los pueblos Americanos" (Violeta Parra) [1:17]

== Personnel ==
- Mercedes Sosa, vocals and drum
- Kelo Palacios, arranger
- Quilapayún, accompanying ensemble on track 7
