= Hoppo (disambiguation) =

Hoppo was the official Superintendent of Maritime Customs in the Qing dynasty

Hoppo may also refer to:

- Hoppo! (band) name of Café Tacuba frontman Rubén Albarrán's side project
- Hoppo! (album) self-titled album from Café Tacuba frontman Rubén Albarrán
- Hoppo, animation character in children's show The Wuzzles
- Hoppo, one of the coven of witches in Thomas Middleton's The Witch (play) 1616

== See also ==
- Hu Bu (Chinese: 戶部), Ministry of Revenue of imperial China
- Hoppo, the romanized Japanese name of Beipu (北埔) in Taiwan during Japanese rule
- Hoppo Ryodo (Japanese: 北方領土) Northern Territories Kuril Islands dispute
