= Alegre Majagual =

Studio album by Los Corraleros de Majagual
- Released: May 1962
- Length: 33:04
- Label: Discos Fuentes

Los Corraleros de Majagual chronology
| Alegre Majagual (1962) | Los Corraleros de Majagual (1962) |

Alegre Majagual is the debut album by the Colombian musical group Los Corraleros de Majagual. It was released on 30 May 1962 on the Discos Fuentes label as LP-0079. The album's liner notes described it as the first jam session in a costeña (coastal) style. The tracks "Majagual", "La Ombligona" and "Se Salió el Toro" were recorded in 1960. The success of those tracks led the group to record the album, in December 1960.

The members of the original group contributing to the album were Calixto Ochoa (humorous antics), Alfredo Gutiérrez (accordion), Tobias Garces (trombone), and César Castro (vocals). Antonio Fuentes was the producer, and Jose Maria Fuentes was the sound engineer.

In a ranking of the 600 greatest Latin American albums compiled by music critics in 2024, Alegre Majagual was ranked No. 488. Critic José Luis Mercado wrote: "The debut of Los Corraleros de Majagual stands out because the sound of cumbia is intertwined with porro and vallenato, and there is an evident prominence of the accordion thanks to Alfredo Gutierrez, who would mark an evolutionary point in the sound of Colombian coastal music in the following discography of the group."

== Track listing ==
Side 1
| No. | Title | Writer(s) | Style | Length |
|---|---|---|---|---|
| 1. | "Se Salió el Toro" | César Castro | Fandango | 2:50 |
| 2. | "La Ñata" | Calixto Ochoa | Paseaíto | 2:56 |
| 3. | "Paloma Guarumera" | Alfredo Gutiérrez | Pasaje | 2:56 |
| 4. | "La Trombona" | Enrique Bonfante | Gaita | 2:36 |
| 5. | "La Ombligona" | Calixto Ochoa | Paseaíto | 2:41 |
| 6. | "Rabo Largo" | Alfredo Gutiérrez | Porro | 2:43 |

Side 2
| No. | Title | Writer(s) | Style | Length |
|---|---|---|---|---|
| 7. | "Ana Felicia" | Alfredo Gutiérrez | Pasaje | 2:55 |
| 8. | "Cielito Azul" | Calixto Ochoa | Merengue | 2:21 |
| 9. | "La Cachuchona" | César Castro | Cumbia | 2:45 |
| 10. | "Majagual" | Alfredo Gutiérrez | Porro | 2:37 |
| 11. | "El Muerto Borracho" | Calixto Ochoa | Paseo | 2:46 |
| 12. | "El Dentista" | Calixto Ochoa | Guaracha | 2:53 |
| Total length: | | | | 33:04 |
