= La voz de la zafra =

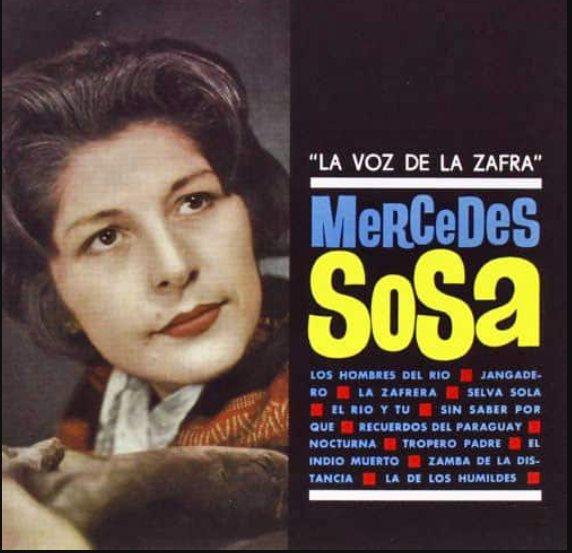

Studio album by Mercedes Sosa
- Released: 1962
- Genre: Latin folk
- Label: RCA Victor Argentina

La voz de la zafra (translation, "the voice of the harvest") is the debut album by Argentine singer Mercedes Sosa. It was recorded in 1961 and released in 1962 on the RCA Victor Argentina label. The album, as originally issued, included 12 songs. Eight of the songs were composed by Armando Tejada Gómez and Manuel Óscar Matus, Sosa's husband. It was reissued in multiple countries and under other titles, including Canta Mercedes Sosa and Mercedes Sosa.

The album was considered an antecedent of Argentina's "Movimiento del Nuevo Cancionero" (New Songbook). The Argentine Ministry of Culture wrote that La voz de la zafra and her second album Canciones con fundamento "established her on the Latin American scene not only because of the quality of her voice and her singing but also because of her enormous social commitment as founder of the Movimiento del Nuevo Cancionero."

== Track listing ==
Side A

1. "Los Hombres Del Rio" ("The Men of the River") [Armando Tejada Gómez, Oscar Matus]
2. "Recuerdos Del Paraguay" ("Paragayan Memories") [Ben Molar, Demetrio Ortiz]
3. "Jangadero" [Ramón Ayala]
4. "La Zafrera" ("The Harvester") [Armando Tejada Gómez, Oscar Matus]
5. "El Rio Y Tu" ("The River and You") [Armando Tejada Gómez, Oscar Matus]
6. "Tropero Padre" ("Herdsman Father") [Armando Tejada Gómez, Oscar Matus]

Side B

1. "Nocturna" ("Nocturnal") [Armando Tejada Gómez, Oscar Matus]
2. "El Indio Muerto" ("The Dead Indian") [Gerardo López]
3. "La De Los Humildes" ("That of the Humble") [Armando Tejada Gómez, Oscar Matus]
4. "Zamba De La Distancia" [Armando Tejada Gómez, Oscar Matus]
5. "Selva Sola" ("Lonely Jungle") [Armando Tejada Gómez, Oscar Matus]
6. "Sin Saber Por Que" ("Without Knowing Why") [Ben Molar, Florentín Giménez]
