= Ovejas =

Coordinates: 9°30′N 75°10′W

- Municipality and town
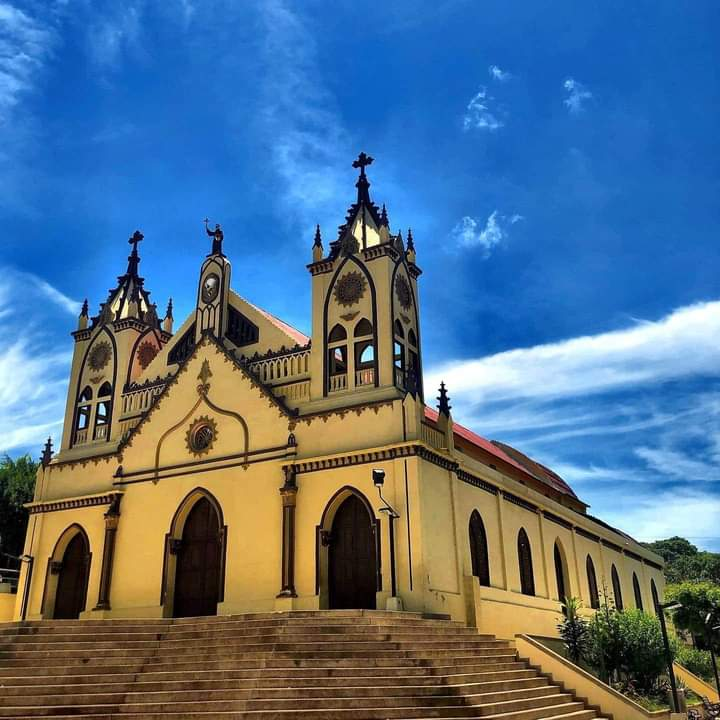
- The church of San Francisco de Asís

- Flag Coat of arms

- Location of the municipality and town of Ovejas in the Sucre Department of Colombia
- Country: Colombia
- Department: Sucre Department

Area
  - Municipality and town: 447 km^{2} (173 sq mi)
- Elevation: 254 m (833 ft)

Population (2015)
  - Municipality and town: 21,091
  - Density: 47.2/km^{2} (122/sq mi)
  - Urban: 11,947
- Time zone: UTC-5 (Colombia Standard Time)

Ovejas is a town and municipality located in the Sucre Department, northern Colombia where the traditional Cumbia (also called Gaita) festival "Francisco Llirene" takes place in October.

== Notable people ==
- Graciela Arango de Tobón, songwriter (1931–2000).
- Nacho Paredes, singer and songwriter (1935–2018)
