= Volver a los 17 =

"Volver a los Diecisiete"

Song by Violeta Parra

from the album Las últimas composiciones
- Language: Spanish
- English title: Back to seventeen
- Written: 1962
- Published: 1966
- Released: 1966
- Recorded: 1962
- Genre: Nueva Cancion Chilena
- Length: 4:18
- Label: RCA Victor

"Volver a los Diecisiete" is a song written and performed by Violeta Parra. It was composed in 1962 but was not released until 1966 on her final album, Las últimas composiciones.

The song was reissued on multiple compilation albums, including The Songs of Violeta Parra (1997) and Antologia (2003). Banned from the musical repertoire during the Augusto Pinochet dictatorship, along with "Gracias a la vida", the lyrics of "Volver a los Diecisiete" have a poetic character and vindication for "the value of feeling above reason" with a rhetoric that seeks to describe "the purifying, ardent effects of achieved love."

== Versions ==
The song has become a standard in the Latin American songbook and has been recorded and performed by numerous artists, including Mercedes Sosa, Milton Nascimento, Joan Manuel Serrat, Franco Simone, Víctor Manuel, Rosa León, Paloma San Basilio, Charly García, Caetano Veloso, Myriam Hernández, Chico Buarque, Zélia Duncan, Gal Costa, Marilia Andrés with Nacho Vegas, Zizi Possi, Claudia Acuña, Angel Parra, Nydia Caro, Rumillajta, Elise Witt, and Rozalén.
