= Alfonsina Storni =

Argentine poet (1892–1938)

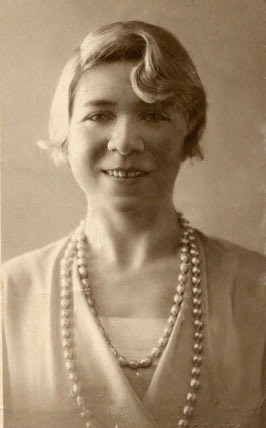
- Born: 22 May 1892; Sala Capriasca, Switzerland
- Died: 25 October 1938 (aged 46); Mar del Plata, Argentina
- Resting place: La Chacarita Cemetery
- Writing career
- Language: Spanish
- Movement: Modernism

Signature
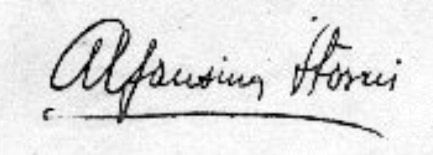

Alfonsina Carolina Storni (22 May 1892 – 25 October 1938) was a Swiss-Argentine poet and playwright of the modernist period.

== Early life ==
Storni was born on May 22, 1892, in Sala Capriasca, Switzerland. Her parents were Alfonso Storni and Paola Martignoni, who were of Italian-Swiss descent. Before her birth, her father had started a brewery in the city of San Juan, Argentina, producing beer and soda. In 1891, following the advice of a doctor, he returned with his wife to Switzerland, where Alfonsina was born the following year; she lived there until she was four years old. In 1896 the family returned to San Juan, Argentina, and a few years later, in 1901, moved to Rosario because of economic issues. There her father opened a tavern, where Storni did a variety of chores. That family business soon failed, however. Storni wrote her first verse at the age of twelve, and continued writing verses during her free time. She later entered into the Colegio de la Santa Unión as a part-time student. In 1906, her father died and she began working in a hat factory to help support her family.

In 1907, her interest in dance led her to join a traveling theatre company, which took her around the country. She performed in Henrik Ibsen's Ghosts, Benito Pérez Galdós's La loca de la casa, and Florencio Sánchez's Los muertos. In 1908, Storni returned to live with her mother, who had remarried and was living in Bustinza (Santa Fe Province). After a year there, Storni went to Coronda, where she studied to become a rural primary schoolteacher. During this period, she also started working for the local magazines Mundo Rosarino and Monos y Monadas, as well as for the prestigious Mundo Argentino.

One of Storni's best friends in her adolescence and youth was Victoria Torni, who would become de facto First Lady of Argentina in the 1940s as the wife of Edelmiro Julián Farrell. The two women graduated together as schoolteachers and worked in rural communities. In her later years, Torni's daughter said that while her mother did not "live off memories", she remembered her intimate friend Alfonsina Storni.

In 1912 she moved to Buenos Aires, seeking the anonymity afforded by a big city. There she met and fell in love with a married man whom she described as "an interesting person of certain standing in the community. He was active in politics..." That year, she published her first short story in Fray Mocho. At age nineteen, she found out that she was pregnant with the child of a journalist and became a single mother. Supporting herself with teaching and newspaper journalism, she lived in Buenos Aires where the social and economical difficulties faced by Argentina's growing middle classes were inspiring an emerging body of women's rights activists.

== Literary career ==
Storni was among the first women to find success in the male-dominated arenas of literature and theater in Argentina, and as such, developed a unique and valuable voice that holds particular relevance in Latin American poetry. Storni was influential, not only to her readers but also to other writers. Though she was known mainly for her poetic works, she also wrote prose, journalistic essays, and drama. Storni often expressed controversial opinions. She criticized a wide range of topics from politics to gender roles and discrimination against women. In Storni's time, her work did not align itself with a particular movement or genre. It was not until the modernist and avant-garde movements began to fade that her work seemed to fit in. She was criticized for her atypical style, and she has been labeled most often as a postmodern writer.

=== Early work ===
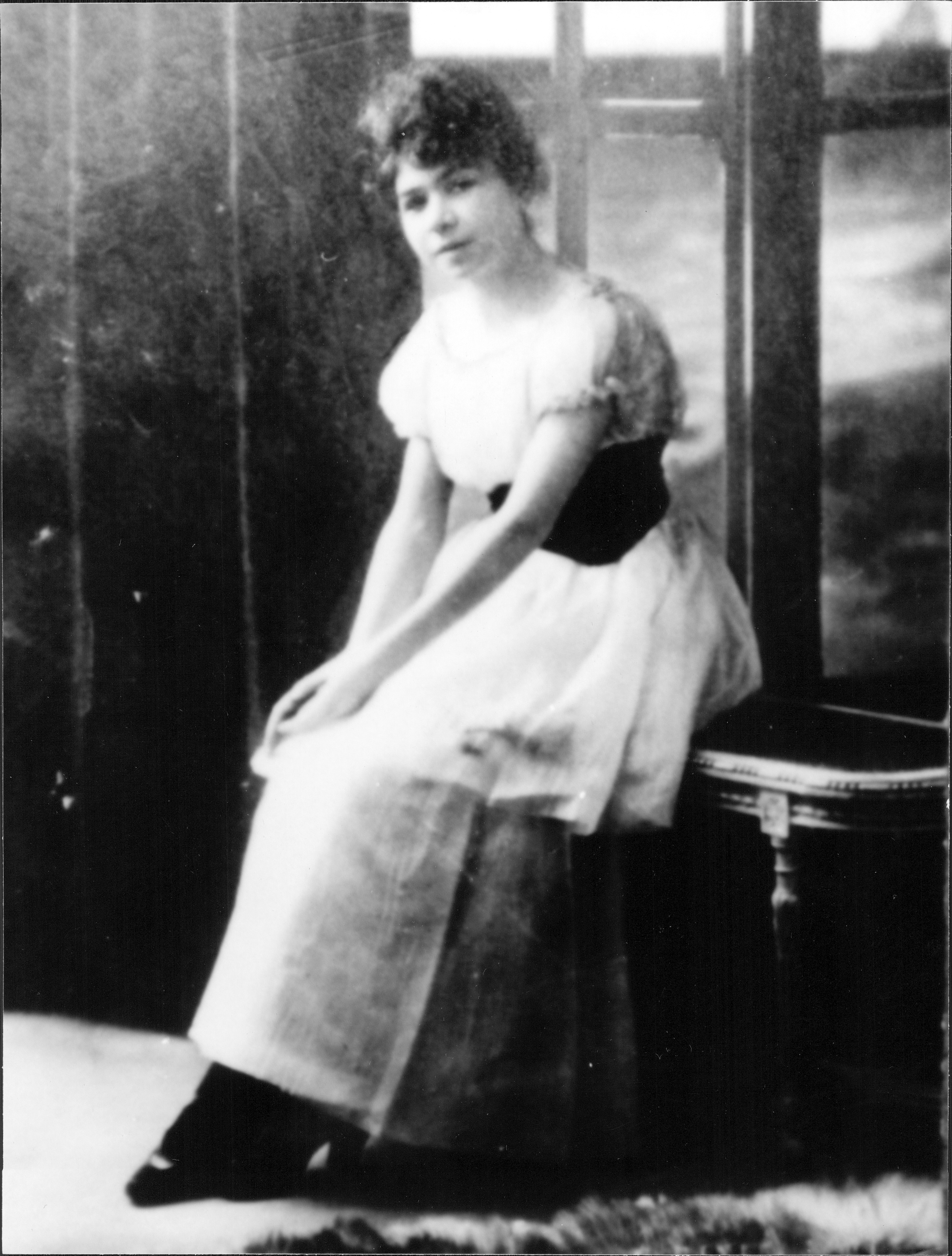
Storni in 1916

Storni published some of her first works in 1916 in Emin Arslan's literary magazine La Nota, where she was a permanent contributor from 28 March until 21 November 1919. Her poems “Convalecer” and “Golondrinas” were published in the magazine. In spite of economic difficulties, she published La inquietud del rosal in 1916, and later started writing for the magazine Caras y Caretas while working as a cashier in a shop. Even though Storni's early works of poetry are among her most well known and highly regarded, they received harsh criticism from some of her male contemporaries, including such well known figures as Jorge Luis Borges and Eduardo Gonzalez Lanuza. The eroticism and feminist themes in her writing were controversial subject matter for poetry during her time, but writing about womanhood in such a direct way was one of her principal innovations as a poet.

=== Wider recognition ===
In the rapidly developing literary scene of Buenos Aires, Storni soon became acquainted with other writers, such as José Enrique Rodó and Amado Nervo. Her economic situation improved, which allowed her to travel to Montevideo, Uruguay. There she met the poet Juana de Ibarbourou, as well as Horacio Quiroga, with whom she would become great friends. Quiroga led the Anaconda group and Storni became a member together with Emilia Bertolé, Ana Weiss de Rossi, Amparo de Hieken, Ricardo Hicken and Berta Singerman

During one of her most productive periods, from 1918 to 1920 Storni published three volumes of poetry: El dulce daño (Sweet Pain), 1918; Irremediablemente (Irremediably), 1919; and Languidez (Languor) 1920. The latter received the first Municipal Poetry Prize and the second National Literature Prize, which added to her prestige and reputation as a talented writer. she also published many articles in prominent newspapers and journals of the time. Later, she continued her experimentation with form in 1925's Ocre, a volume composed almost entirely of sonnets that are among her most traditional in structure. These verses were written around the same time as the more loosely structured prose poems of her lesser-known volume, Poemas de Amor, from 1926.

The magazine Nosotros was influential in spearheading the rise of new Argentine literature by helping to form the opinions of the readers. In 1923, Nosotros published a survey aimed at members of the “new literary generation.” The question was simple: Which three or four poets under the age of thirty do you admire the most? At that time, Storni had just turned thirty-one, and was too old to be considered a “Master of the new generation.”

Her work has been broadly translated into English. A notable anthology: Alfonsina and The Sea: Selected Poems (2024) was published by Huayruro Editorial, containing poems selected broadly from her career and the celebrated prose poems: Poems of Love.

=== Theater ===
After the critical success of Ocre, Storni decided to focus on writing drama. Her first public work, the autobiographical play El amo del mundo was performed in the Cervantes theater on March 10, 1927, but was not well received by the public. However, this was not a conclusive indication of the quality of the work; many critics have observed that during those years Argentinian theater as a whole was in a state of decline, so many quality works of drama failed in this atmosphere. After the play's short run, Storni had it published in Bambalinas, where the original title is shown to have been Dos mujeres. Her Dos farsas pirotécnicas were published in 1931.

She wrote the following works intended for children: Blanco...Negro...Blanco, Pedro y Pedrito, Jorge y su Conciencia, Un sueño en el camino, Los degolladores de estatuas and El Dios de los pájaros. They were brief theatre pieces with songs and dances. They were meant for her students at Teatro Labardén theatre. For Pedrito y Pedro and Blanco...Negro...Blanco, Alfonsina wrote the music for the plays. These were performed in 1948 at Teatro Colón theatre in Buenos Aires. On these, Julieta Gómez Paz says: "These present, ironically, adult situations transferred to the children's world to outline errors, prejudice and damaging customs by adults, but corrected by the poetic fantasy with happy endings."

=== Later work ===
After a nearly 8-year hiatus from publishing volumes of poetry, Storni published El mundo de siete pozos (The World of Seven Wells), 1934. That volume, together with the final volume she published before her death, Mascarilla y trébol (Mask and Clover), 1938, mark the height of her poetic experimentation. The final volume includes the use of what she termed "antisonnets," or poems that used many of the versification structures of traditional sonnets but did not follow the traditional rhyme scheme.

== Friendship with Gabriela Mistral ==
Around this time, Gabriela Mistral visited her in her house on Cuba street. It was a fateful meeting for the Chilean writer, who had already published in El Mercurio that year. Previously, when she arranged her appointment on the phone, she was impressed with Storni's voice; and so when she was told that Storni was ugly, she expected a face that did not match the voice. When she finally met Storni, she told her her face did not match what she had been told about her appearance. “Her head was extraordinary” she remembered “Not because of her features, but because of her very silvery hair which framed her young face well.” She insisted “I haven’t seen more beautiful hair, it was as strange as the moonlight at noon. It was golden, and some blond was still visible in the white. Her blue eyes, her steep french nose, and her pink skin gave her something childish that gave her something different and made her almost unapproachable and mature." The Chilean was impressed by her simplicity and sobriety, by her control of her emotions, and her authenticity. And above all, she was impressed by her ability to absorb all around her. Mistral called her a woman of a great city “who has passed, touching all and incorporating all.”

== Relationship with Horacio Quiroga ==
Jose Maria Delgado wrote to Horacio Quiroga and recommended that he travel to Buenos Aires to get to know Storni and talk about her poetry. They began to go to the cinema together with both of their children and had an opportunity to go to a meeting in a house on Tronador street, where many great writers of the age met to play games. One of these games consisted of Storni and Quiroga kissing opposite sides of Quiroga's pocket watch at the same time. As Storni's lips approached the watch, Quiroga moved it out of the way and the two kissed, angering Storni's mother, who was also present at the party.

Quiroga frequently mentioned Storni in his letters between 1919 and 1922, but the true depth of their relationship is not known, and the fact that he mentions her stands out since there were not many female writers during that time. In his letters to his friend Jose Maria, Quiroga mentions his respect for her work and how he treats her as equal. On a note for the Anaconda group's trip to Montevideo, the list of participants includes “Alfonsina” without her last name, a demonstration of their strong friendship. On the other hand, in a note dated May 11, 1922, about a future visit, Quiroga revealed that he would travel with both his children and Storni, and would have them all eat together. Furthermore, Emir Rodriguez Monegal, Quiroga's biographer, corroborated Emilio Oribe’s account that Quiroga waited for Storni to leave a conference at the university where she might have been speaking about the poetry of Delmira Agustini. Quiroga did not want to attend the event, but did wait for Storni at the exit; she appeared, covered by a straw hat and surprised the people in the neighborhood that were near the exit.

Storni accompanied Quiroga to the movies, to literary meetings, and to listen to music: both were fans of Wagner. Frequently, they traveled to Montevideo and took pictures where the two looked happy. They went on the trips together because Quiroga was assigned to the Uruguayan consulate and was always accompanied by a female intellectual.

When Quiroga traveled to Misiones in 1925, Storni did not go with him on the advice of Benito Quinquela Martin, who told her: “You’re going with that psycho? No way!” As a result, the writer instead traveled to San Ignacio, leaving her apartment to Uruguayan Enrique Amorim. With this living arrangement, Storni was able to write to Quiroga, who did not write back. The trip lasted a year, and upon returning, Quiroga re-established a friendship with Storni. After a reunion in a house that Quiroga had rented from Vicente Lopez, where they read each other's writings, the two later went out to the movies and various concerts offered by the Wagner Society.

This relationship ended in 1927 when Quiroga met Maria Elena Bravo and started his second marriage. It is not known if Quiroga and Storni were lovers, since the two did not address the nature of their love very much. What is known is that Storni saw Quiroga as a friend who understood her, and she dedicated a poem to him when he died by suicide in 1937, only a year before her own death.

== Illness and death ==
In 1935, Storni may have discovered a lump on her left breast and decided to undergo an operation. On May 20, 1935, she underwent a radical mastectomy. In 1938 she found out that the breast cancer had reappeared. Around 1:00 AM on Tuesday, 25 October 1938, Storni left her room and headed towards the sea at La Perla beach in Mar del Plata, Argentina and died by suicide. Later that morning two workers found her body washed up on the beach. Although her biographers hold that she jumped into the water from a breakwater, a popular legend is that she slowly walked into the sea until she drowned. She is buried in La Chacarita Cemetery. Her death inspired Ariel Ramírez and Félix Luna to compose the song "Alfonsina y el mar" ("Alfonsina and the Sea"). A contemporary bilingual (English-Spanish) anthology with the same title (Alfonsina and the Sea: Selected Poems) was published in 2024 by Huayruro Editorial

Argentine composer Julia Stilman-Lasansky used Storni's text for her composition Cuadrados y Angulos. In 2009 Juan María Solare composed a cycle of songs with texts by Alfonsina Storni: Viejas palabras (which consists of the songs Viaje, El sueño, Cuadrados y ángulos and ¿Qué diría la gente? plus three short piano interludes in between the songs).

== Work ==
- 1916 La inquietud del rosal ("The Restlessness of the Rosebush")
- 1916 Por los niños que han muerto("For the kids that have died")
- 1916 Canto a los niños("Sing to the Children")
- 1918 El dulce daño ("The Sweet Harm")
- 1918 Atlántida colaboracion.
- 1919 Irremediablemente ("Irremediably")
- 1919 Una golondrina

1919 "Peso Ancestral"

- 1920 Languidez ("Languidness")
- 1925 Ocre ("Ochre")
- 1926 Poemas de amor ("Love poems")
- 1927 El amo del mundo: comedia en tres actos - play ("Master of the world: a comedy in three acts"
- 1932 Dos farsas pirotécnicas - play ("Two pyrotechnic farces")
- 1934 Mundo de siete pozos ("World of seven wells")
- 1938 Mascarilla y trébol ("Mask and trefoil")
- 1938 Voy a dormir ("I´m going to sleep")

Post mortem:

- 1938 Antología poética ("Poetic anthology")
- 1950 Teatro infantil ("Plays for children")
- 1968 Poesías completas ("Complete poetical works")
- 1998 Nosotras y la piel: selección de ensayos ("We (women) and the skin: selected essays")

== Awards and recognition ==
In 1910 she receives her title as "Maestra Rural".

In 1917 Storni receives the Premio Annual del Consejo Nacional de Mujeres.

In 1920 Languidez, one of her publications was awarded the First Municipal prize as well as the second National Literature Prize.
