= Graciela Arango de Tobón =

Colombian songwriter

- Born: Graciela Arango Peláez; 7 March 1931; Ovejas, Colombia
- Died: 11 February 2000 (aged 68) Cali, Colombia
- Years active: 1965–1985
- Labels: Codiscos, Sonolux
- Spouse: Hernán Tobón Pizarro
- Children: 5

Graciela Arango de Tobón (1931–2000) was a Colombian songwriter. She wrote songs in a wide range of styles, which were recorded by several Colombian artists, and wrote a regular column on guitar playing in Colombian newspaper El Espectador.

== Biography ==
=== Early life and education ===
Arango was born on 7 March 1931 in Ovejas, Colombia, to Julio Arango Villa and Carmen Peláez. She went to school in Ovejas and Cartagena, and studied teaching in Medellín. In Medellín Arango learned to play guitar, piano, tiple, and accordion. At the age of 18 she married Hernán Tobón Pizarro, and they moved to Cali. Together they had 5 children.

=== Music career ===
Arango's first composition was "Tus Trenzas", a bambuco that she submitted to a 1965 songwriting contest called Orquídea de Plata. The song won, and was recorded by the trio Los Quechuas. Arango wrote songs in a wide range of styles, which were performed by musicians including Helenita Vargas, Óscar Golden, Lyda Zamora, and Carmenza Duque. Her notable compositions include:

- tropical songs: "El Farolito", "Cumbia en Azul", "El Cumbión del Cangrejo", "La Cebolla", "Mis Zapatos Viejos", "Me Voy Pa' Macondo", "Por las Buenas"
- pasillos: "Lo Que Más Me Está Doliendo", "No Queda Nada en Mí"
- waltzes: "No Te Vuelvo a Ver"
- boleros and ballads: "Sin Cadenas", "Mi Huella", "Afirmativamente", "Mentiras", "Qué Es Pecar", "Quiero un Hogar"
- other: "Don Goyo" (also known as "Ese Muerto No lo Cargo Yo"), "Señor"

For several years Arango wrote a column on guitar playing in Colombian newspaper El Espectador, under the pseudonym "Canciones del Sábado". According to her daughter, Arango stopped composing music when her husband died in 1985.

=== Death ===
Arango died in Cali on 11 February 2000.

== Awards and recognition ==
- In 1973 Arango became the first Colombian to win an award at the Viña del Mar International Song Festival.
- Won best composer at the 1982 Mono Núñez Festival.
- Awarded a "Lira de Oro" in 1982 by SAYCO, the Colombian copyright collection society, for being the "most prolific and multifaceted female composer in the country."
