= Breve historia de los Argentinos =

Breve Historia de los Argentinos
- Author: Félix Luna
- Cover artist: Silvina Rodríguez Pícaro
- Country: Argentina
- Language: Spanish language
- Genre: History of Argentina
- Publisher: Planeta
- Published: 1993

Breve historia de los Argentinos is a book written by Argentine historian Félix Luna. It was published in 1993 by Grupo Editorial Planeta, reedited many times, and translated to English and Portuguese. The book reproduces a series of conferences given by Luna in 1992, after the destruction of his house during the 1992 Israeli Embassy attack in Buenos Aires.

== Description ==
The book explains the history of Argentina from the creation of the city of Buenos Aires up to the government of the Revolución Libertadora. The author stops the narration at such point, stating that he had chosen not to explain topics he had lived by himself. The last chapter has some general overviews.

The book is not completely a history book, but rather an essay. The author merely explains in a didactic way the main events and developments and the contexts that influenced them, without going into detail about battles, dates or names.

== Edition ==
The book was edited first in 1993, and reedited in 1994 and later years. An expanded version was edited in 2006, explaining up to the government of Néstor Kirchner. Those parts were taken from the book Historia integral de la Argentina, by the same author.
