= Una Voz y una Guitarra =

Studio album by Atahualpa Yupanqui
- Released: 1953
- Genre: Argentine folk
- Length: 23:37
- Label: Odeon

Atahualpa Yupanqui chronology
Una Voz y una Guitarra (1953)	Camino del Indio (1955)

Una Voz y una Guitarra is an album by Argentine singer and guitarist Atahualpa Yupanqui. It was released in October 1953 on the Odeon label. It was Yupanqui's first album. It was the No. 1 album in Argentina in its year of release.

== Track listing ==
Side A

1. "Recuerdos del Portezuelo" (Atahualpa Yupanqui)
2. "Malquistao" (Atahualpa Yupanqui)
3. "El Vendedor de Yuyos" (Atahualpa Yupanqui, Pablo del Cerro)
4. "Chacarera de las Piedras" (Atahualpa Yupanqui, Pablo del Cerro)

Side B

1. "Minero Soy" (Atahualpa Yupanqui)
2. "Tierra Querida!" (Atahualpa Yupanqui)
3. "Huajra" (Atahualpa Yupanqui)
4. "Cruz del Sur" (Atahualpa Yupanqui)
