= Son Con Guaguancó =

Studio album by Celia Cruz
- Released: 1966
- Genre: Guaracha, Guaguancó, Guajira, Cha-Cha, Bolero, Mambo
- Length: 33:58
- Label: Tico Records
- Producer: Al Santiago

Professional ratings
Review scores
Source	Rating
AllMusic	4.5/5 stars
The Encyclopedia of Popular Music	3/5 stars
Record Collector	4/5 stars
Songlines	5/5 stars

Son Con Guaguancó is a studio album recorded by Celia Cruz and released on the Tico Records label in 1966 (SLP-1143). It was Cruz's first major release as a solo artist in the United States without the Sonora Matancera.

The album has been recognized as one of the great works of Latin music. In Los 600 de Latinoamérica, a 2024 ranking of the 600 greatest Latin American albums by music critics, Son Con Guaguancó was ranked No. 8. It was also included in NPR's 2018 listing of the "150 Greatest Albums Made By Women". In his review for AllMusic, John Bush wrote: "The record, produced by Al Santiago and featuring perhaps the best salsa band ever formed (the Alegre All Stars), positively sizzles with heat and energy."

In 2025, the centennial year of Cruz's birth, Craft Recordings began reissuing some of her albums, beginning with Son Con Guaguancó. In a review of the reissue, Songlines wrote that Son Con Guaguancó "didn't sell anything like as well as later albums but it was a decisive door-opener."

== Track listing ==
No.	Title	Length
1.	"Bemba Colorá"	3:31
2.	"Son Con Guaguancó"	2:49
3.	"Es La Humanidad"	2:24
4.	"Lo Mismo Si Que No"	2:56
5.	"Oye Mi Consejo"	2:48
6.	"Se Me Perdió La Cartera"	2:34
7.	"Tremendo Guaguancó"	3:11
8.	"Permiteme"	2:32
9.	"No Hay Manteca"	2:28
10.	"El Cohete"	2:41
11.	"La Adivinanza"	2:49
12.	"Amarra La Yegua"	3:15
Total length:		33:58

== Credits ==
- Arrangements – Bobby Valentin, Charlie Palmieri, Louie Ramirez, Tito Puente
- Producer – Al Santiago
