= Alfonsina y el mar =

Song by Ariel Ramírez and Félix Luna

Song by Ariel Ramírez and Félix Luna
- Language: Spanish
- Composer(s): Ariel Ramírez
- Lyricist(s): Félix Luna

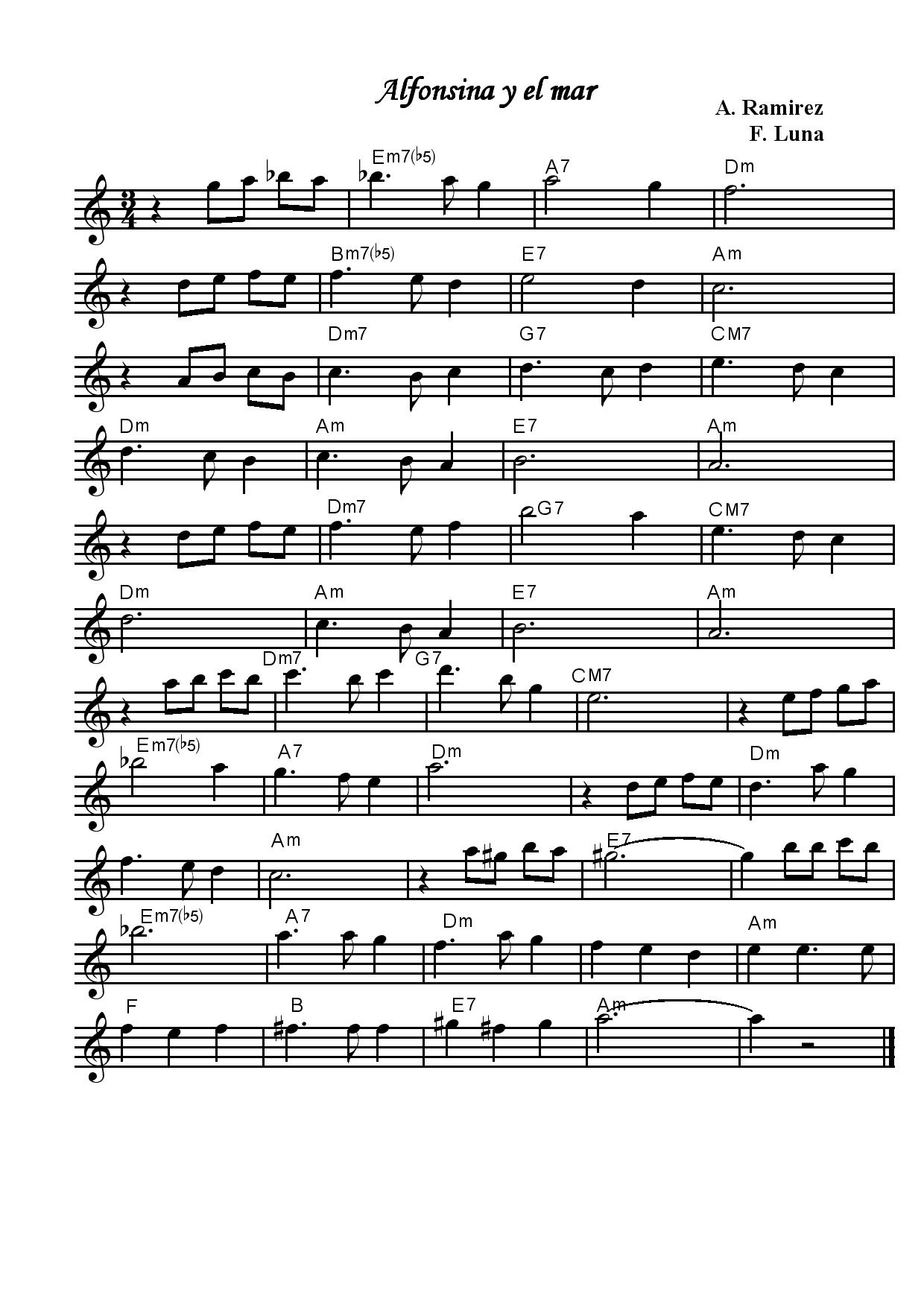
Sheet music

"Alfonsina y el mar" (lit. 'Alfonsina and the sea') is a zamba composed by Argentine pianist Ariel Ramírez and written by Argentine writer Félix Luna. It was first released as part of Mercedes Sosa's 1969 album Mujeres argentinas. The song is a tribute to Argentine poet Alfonsina Storni, who committed suicide in 1938 by jumping into the sea from a jetty. The song is a classic and has been interpreted by many artists of different nationalities.
