= Ariel Ramírez =

Argentine composer (1921–2010)

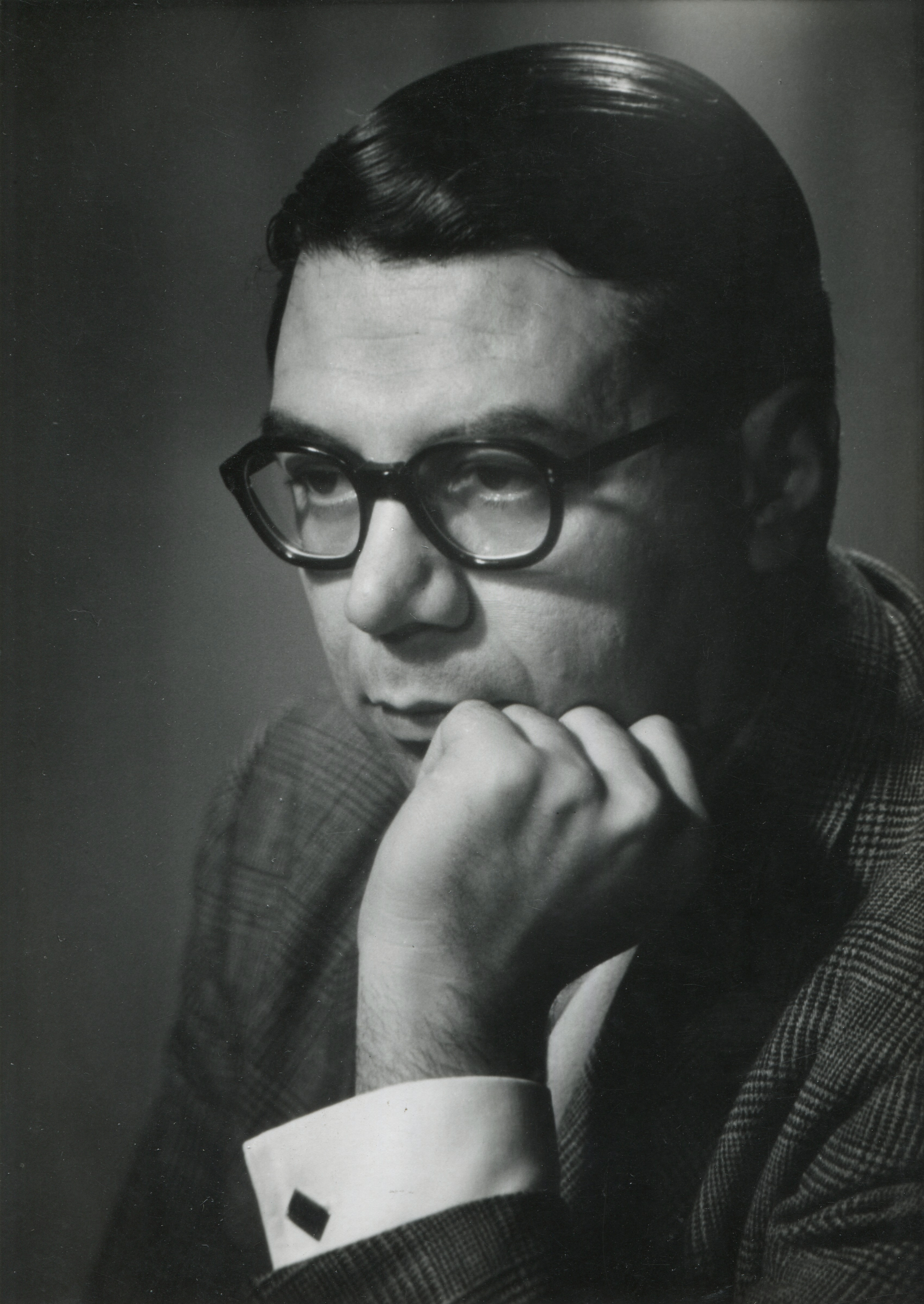
- Portrait of Ariel Ramírez by Anatole Saderman, 1957
- Born: 4 September 1921; Santa Fe, Argentina
- Died: 18 February 2010 (aged 88); Monte Grande, Buenos Aires, Argentina
- Occupations: Composer; pianist; music director

Ariel Ramírez (4 September 1921 – 18 February 2010) was an Argentine composer, pianist and music director. He was considered "a chief exponent of Argentine folk music" and noted for his "iconic" musical compositions.

Ramírez is known primarily for his Misa Criolla (1964). It allowed him to travel around Europe and Latin America to build his reputation. However, he wrote more than 300 compositions during his career, and sold over 10 million albums.

== Biography ==
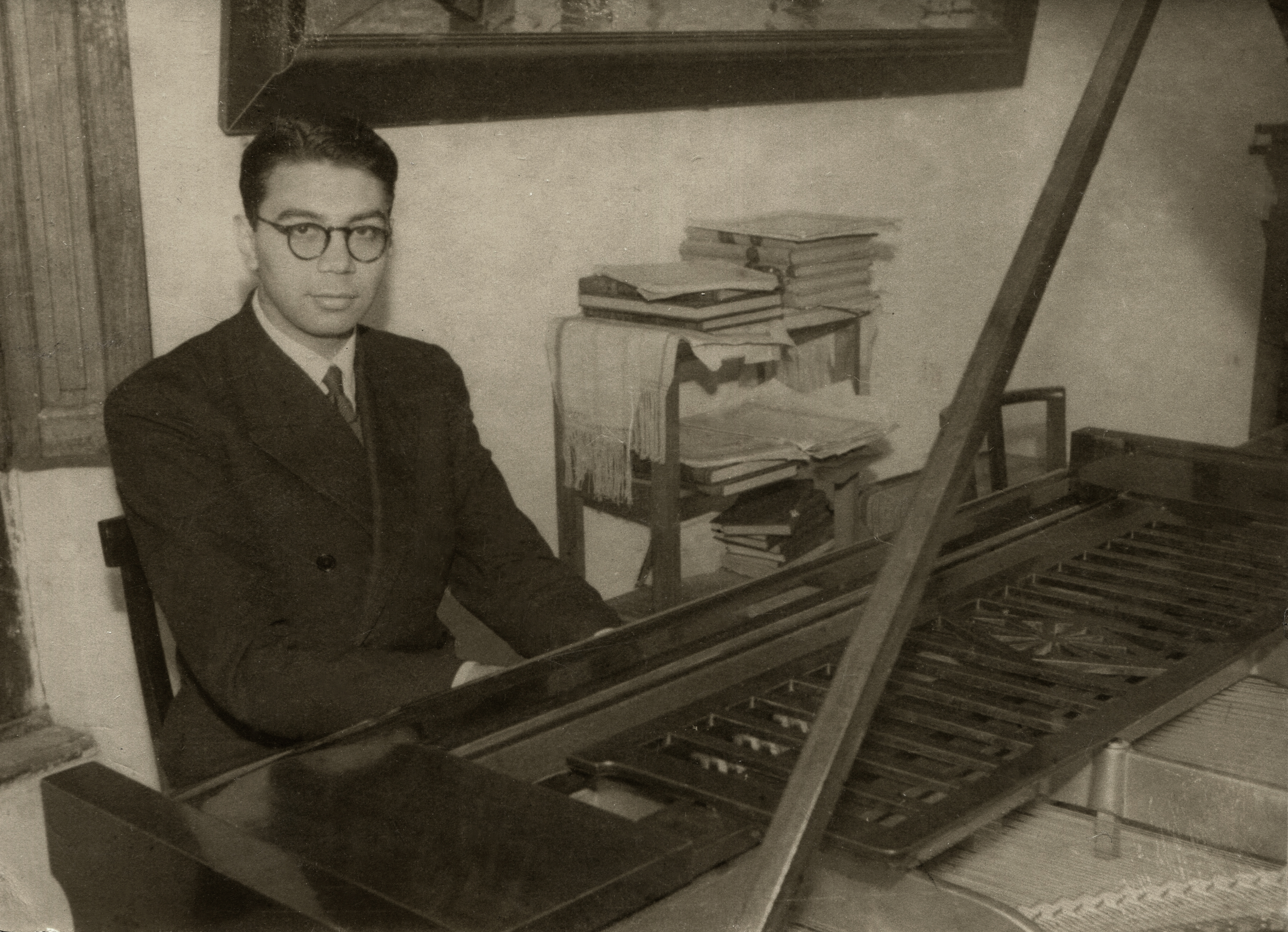
Ariel Ramírez next to a piano in 1938

Ariel Ramírez was born in Santa Fe, Argentina. His father, who was from Spain and immigrated to Argentina, was a teacher and it had been thought Ramírez would also pursue this career path but the job lasted for just two days due to "discipline problems". He initially pursued tango before switching to Argentine folklore. He began his piano studies in Santa Fe, and soon became fascinated with the music of the gauchos and creoles in the mountains. He continued his studies in Córdoba, where he met the great Argentine folk singer and songwriter Atahualpa Yupanqui and was influenced by him.

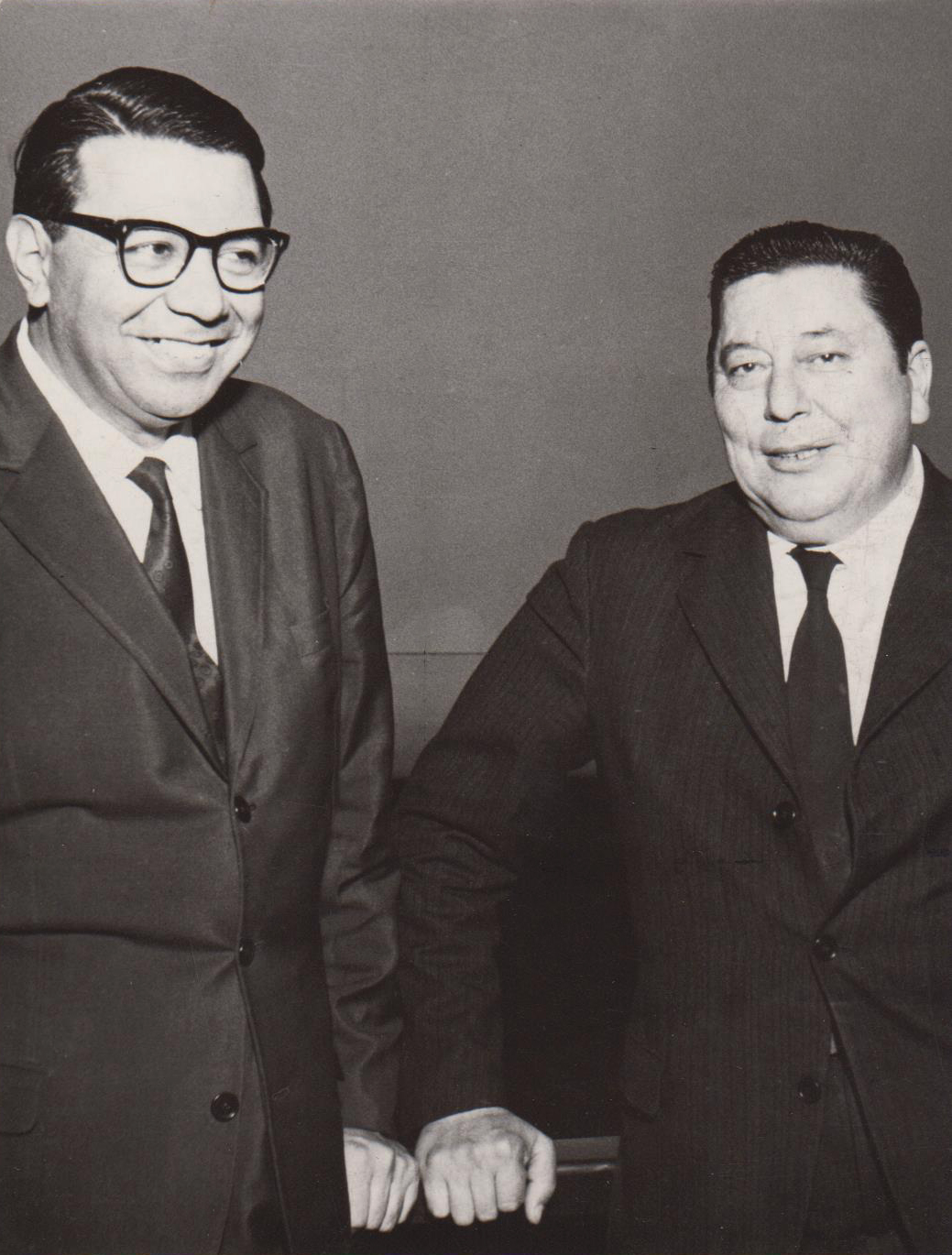
Ariel Ramírez with Atahualpa Yupanqui c. 1962

Following a suggestion from Yupanqui, he visited the northeastern part of Argentina, and deepened his research into the traditional rhythms of South America. He spent time in Mendoza and Buenos Aires. At the same time continuing his academic studies as a composer at the National Conservatory of Music, in Buenos Aires. He made his first recording in 1946, with RCA; he made twenty records with that label until 1956. Plácido Domingo, José Carreras and Mercedes Sosa are some of the artists to have recorded his work. He was also associated with Miguel Brascó and Félix Luna.

Ramírez went on to study classical music in Madrid, Rome and mainly in Vienna, from 1950 to 1954. Back in Argentina, he collected over 400 folk and country songs and popular songs and founded the Compañía de Folklore Ariel Ramírez.

Ramírez had two daughters, Mariana and Laura, and a son, Facundo. (NB: The Washington Post reported in error that he had two sons.) He married musicologist Norma Inés Cuello de Ramírez.

== Compositions ==
In 1964, the Ramírez composition Misa Criolla marked the beginning of a period of high musical productivity for the composer, which also heralded the premieres of the works Navidad Nuestra and La Peregrinación (both 1964); Los Caudillos (1965); Mujeres Argentinas (1969), and Alfonsina y el mar (1969), all produced in collaboration with writer Félix Luna. Misa Criolla and Alfonsina y el mar are probably his best-known compositions.

=== Misa Criolla ===
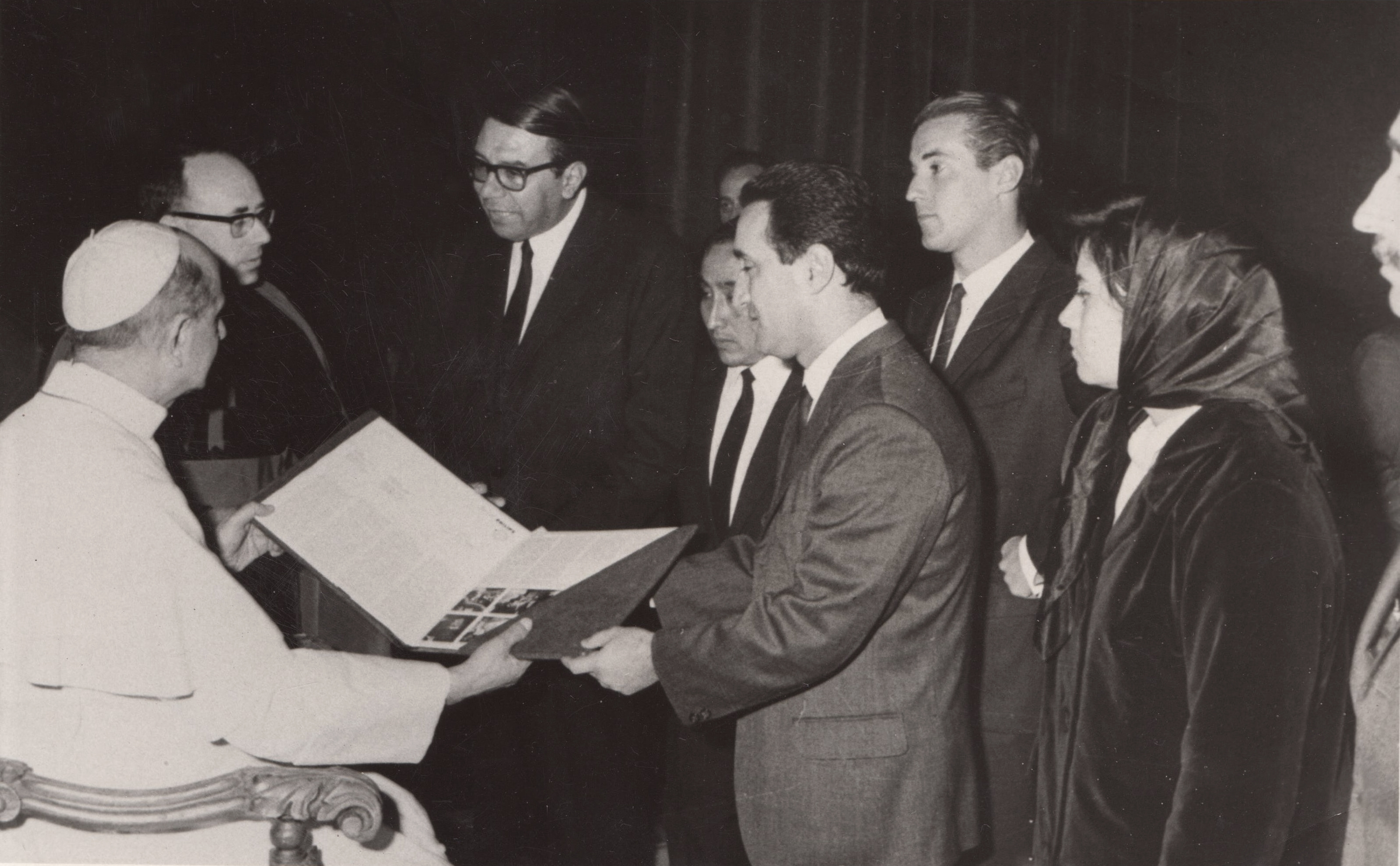
Ramírez gifts a copy of Misa Criolla to Pope Paul VI

Misa Criolla was one of the first masses not in Latin shortly after the Second Vatican Council permitted use of the vernacular in Catholic churches. The Washington Post wrote that the Misa Criolla is "widely regarded as a stunning artistic achievement, [that] combined Spanish text with indigenous instruments and rhythms". It led to album sales numbering in the millions internationally. Ramírez once told The Jerusalem Post how Misa Criolla was inspired by a visit to Germany after World War II. While there, he had an encounter with two of five sisters (siblings, not nuns), who had regularly risked their lives bringing food to prisoners of the Nazis in their neighbourhood, which led him to consider writing "a spiritual piece". This would eventually become the Misa Criolla.

The Misa—a 16-minute Mass for either male or female soloists, chorus, and traditional instruments—is based on folk genres such as chacarera, carnavalito, and estilo pampeano, with Andean influences and instruments. Ramírez wrote the piece from 1963 to 1964, and it was recorded in 1965 by Philips Records, directed by Ramírez himself with Los Fronterizos as featured performers (Philips 820-39 LP, including Navidad Nuestra, remastered in 1994 and released by Philips as CD 526 155). It was not publicly performed until 1967 in Düsseldorf, Germany, during a European tour that eventually brought Ariel Ramírez before Pope Paul VI. Other notable recordings feature the solo voices of George Dalaras (1989), José Carreras (1990), and Mercedes Sosa (1999). Plácido Domingo recorded the Kyrie (the first movement of the Misa) with Dominic Miller on guitar (2003). On 12 December 2014, the feast of Our Lady of Guadalupe, it was performed in St. Peter's Basilica, Rome at the invitation of Pope Francis, with Patricia Sosa as the soprano soloist and conducted by Facundo Ramírez, son of the composer, who had conducted its first performance in St. Peter's Basilica exactly fifty years before.

=== "Alfonsina y el mar" ===
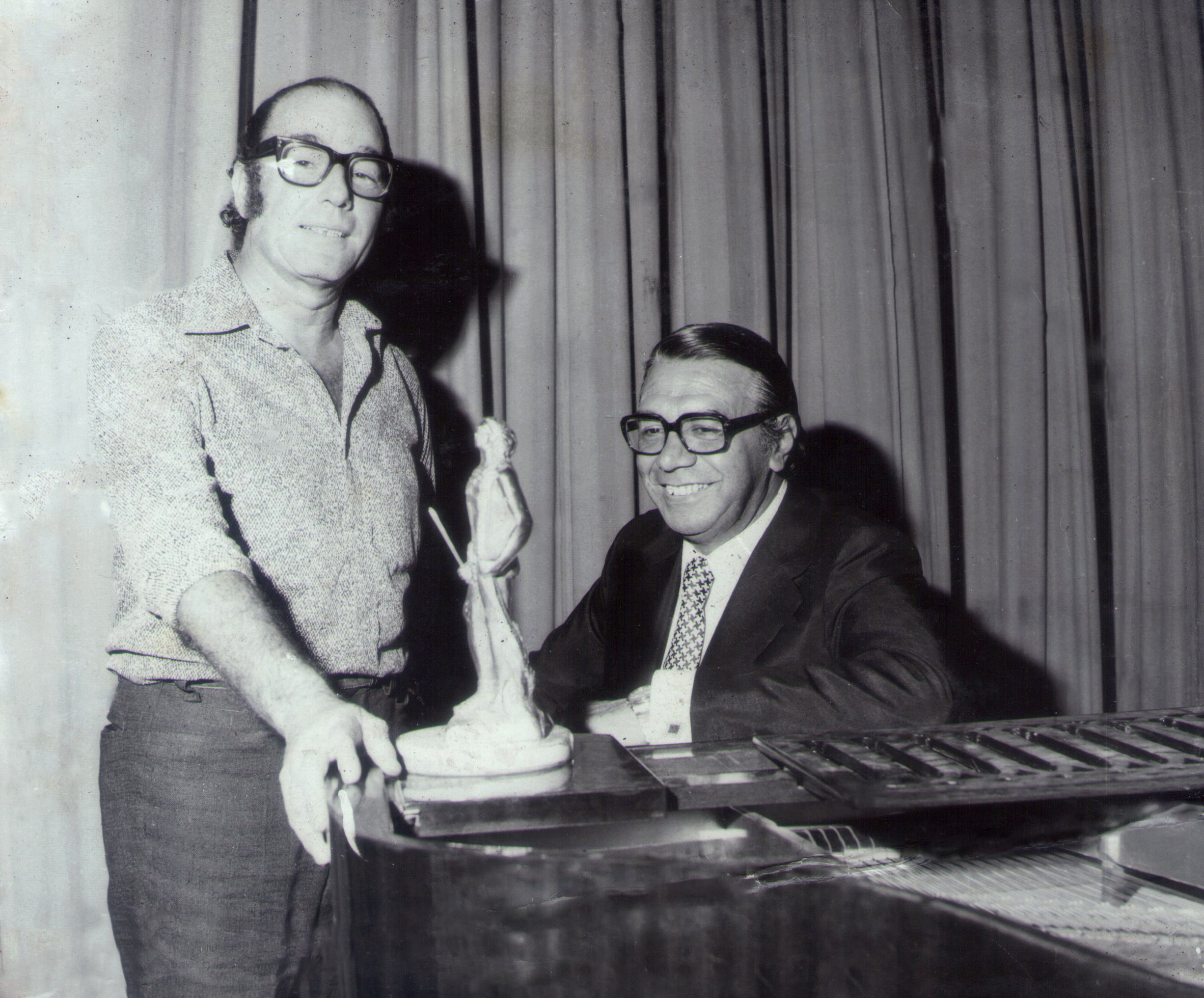
Ariel Ramírez and Félix Luna, composers of Alfonsina y el mar

While not sharing the same worldwide success, Alfonsina y el mar enjoys great popularity in Latin America and Spain, being one of the most well regarded songs in Argentine folk music. The piece pays homage to poet Alfonsina Storni, evoking her tragic suicide in 1938, when she threw herself into the sea at La Perla beach in Mar del Plata, and the poem she wrote as a goodbye message, I Am Going to Sleep. Artists of the stature of Mercedes Sosa, Nana Mouskouri, Violeta Parra, Alfredo Kraus, Avishai Cohen and José Carreras (with Pasión Vega) have made recordings of the song, as well as many other popular singers including Shakira, Ane Brun, Miguel Bosé, Andrés Calamaro and Paloma San Basilio.

=== Other ===
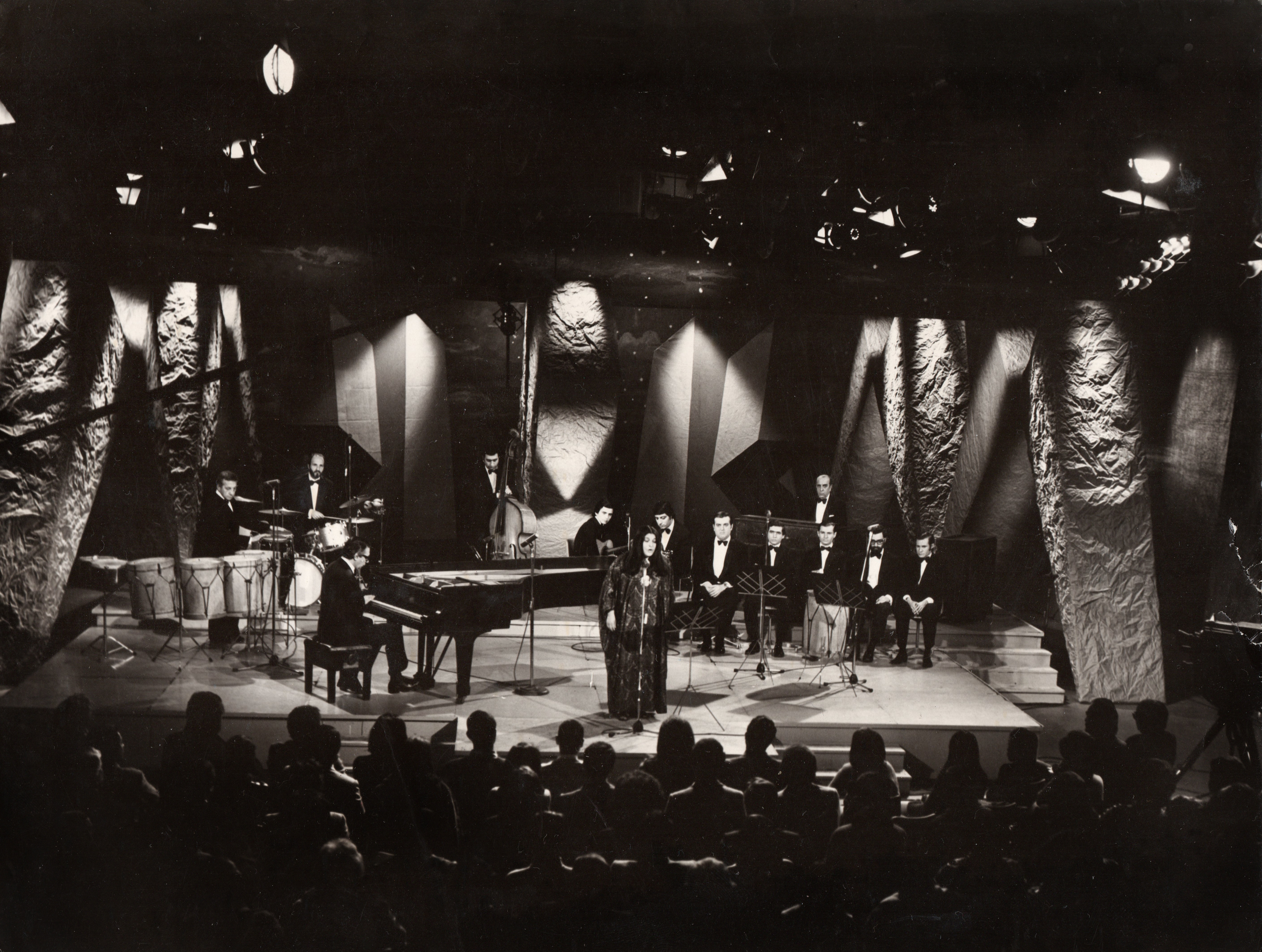
Live performance of Cantata sudamericana at Channel 11 studios in 1972

Other major compositions by Ramírez include the Cantata Sudamericana ("South American Cantata": again with text by Félix Luna, 1972) and the Misa por la paz y la justicia ("Mass for Peace and Justice", 1981), with texts by Félix Luna and Osvaldo Catena. He wrote more than 300 compositions during his career. With Luna he created the Mercedes Sosa hit album Mujeres Argentinas ("Argentine Women", 1969), which documented women fighting for their freedom.

Along with the Hamlet Lima Quintana, Ramírez composed the music for Carlos Saura's TV film Los Cuentos de Borges: El Sur, which is based on the short story El Sur by Argentine author Jorge Luis Borges.

== Society of Authors and Composers of the Argentine Republic ==
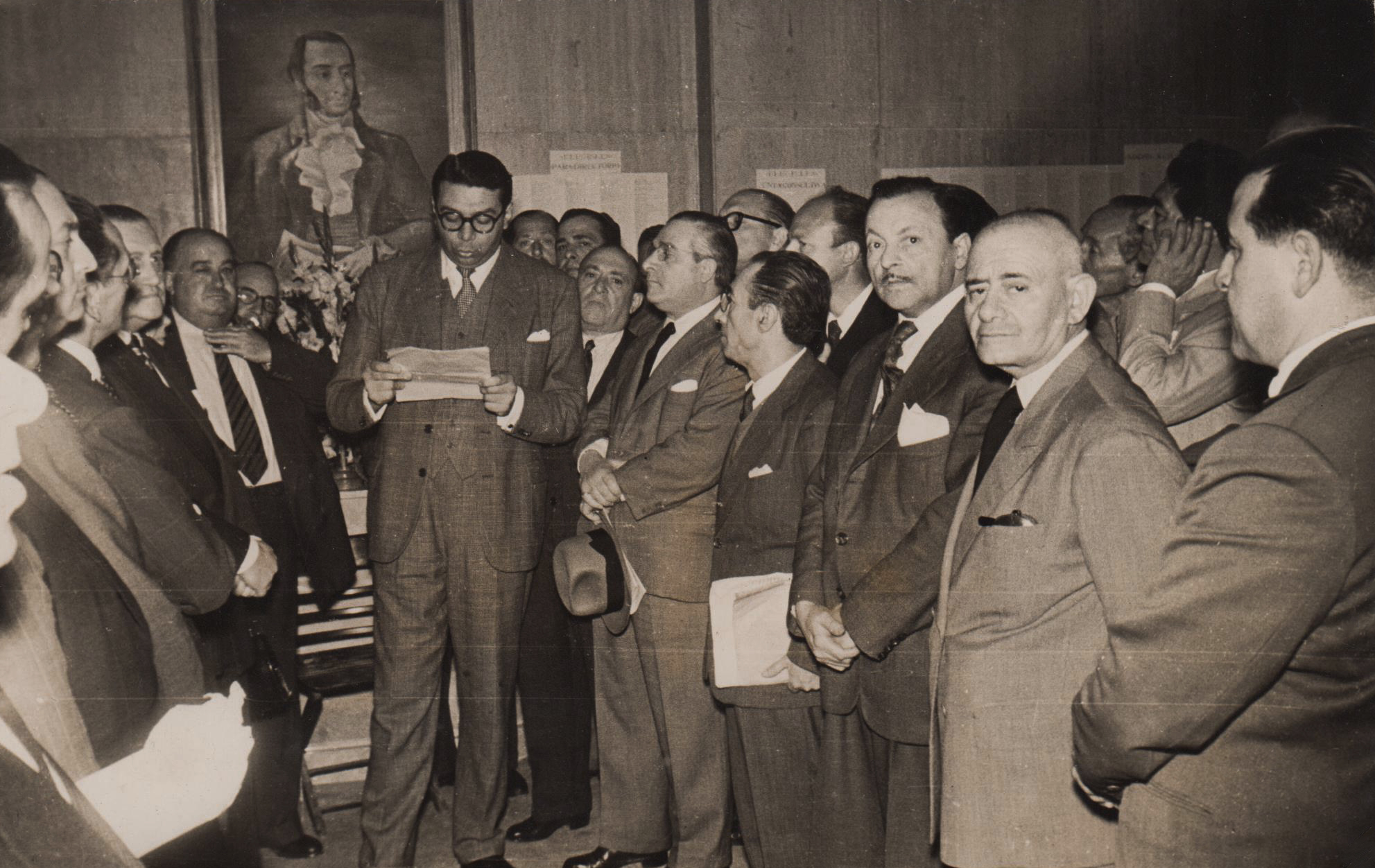
Ramírez giving a speech at SADAIC c. 1955

Ramírez was first elected president of the Society of Authors and Composers of the Argentine Republic (SADAIC) in 1970, serving for two four-year terms. He was returned to the post in 1993 and remained in that capacity until ill health forced him to step down in 2004. At the time of his death he was still chairman of the organization's advisory board.

== Death ==
Ramírez developed pneumonia in early 2010, from which he died on February 18 in a Monte Grande clinic at the age of 88. His wake was held in Congress at the Salón de los Pasos Perdidos, and he was buried at Chacarita Cemetery in the Argentine Society of Authors and Composers' mausoleum on February 21, 2010. Singer Patricia Sosa described him as "the biggest folklore composer in History. [...] The whole world cries the death of such a beautiful gentleman".

== See also ==
- List of best-selling Latin music artists
