= Las últimas composiciones =

Studio album by Violeta Parra
- Released: November 1966
- Recorded: August–October 1966
- Genre: Chilean folklore
- Length: 40:41
- Label: RCA Victor

Violeta Parra chronology
| Carpa de La Reina (1966) | Las últimas composiciones (1966) |

Las últimas composiciones (English: The Last Compositions) is a studio album by Violeta Parra released by RCA Victor (CML-2456) in November 1966. It was the final album by Parra, who committed suicide in February 1967. The album contains 14 songs, including three of Parra's most enduring songs, "Gracias a la vida", "Volver a los Diecisiete", and "Run-Run Se Fue Pa’l Norte".

Uruguayan singer Alberto Giménez Zapicán sings duets with Parra on tracks 4, 6, 7, and 11, and plays bombo on additional tracks. Angel Parra plays guitar on tracks 1, 3, 10, and 13, and drumming on the guitar on track 7. Isabel Parra drums on the guitar on track 7 and plays bells on track 13.

The album cover features a photograph of Parra by Javier Pérez. The original release included a four-page insert with the song lyrics.

In a ranking of the 600 greatest Latin American albums compiled by music critics in 2024, Las últimas composiciones was ranked No. 2.

== Track listing ==
1. "Gracias a la vida" ("thanks to life") (Violeta Parra) 4:42
2. "El 'albertío'" (Violeta Parra) 2:08
3. "Cantores que reflexionan" (Violeta Parra) 2:27
4. "Pupila de águila" (Violeta Parra) (duet with Alberto Zapicán) 3:17
5. "Run-Run Se Fue Pa’l Norte" (Violeta Parra) 4:01
6. "Maldigo del alto cielo" (Violeta Parra) (duet with Alberto Zapicán) 4:03
7. "La cueca de los poetas" (Nicanor Parra - Violeta Parra) (duet Alberto Zapicán) 1:44
8. "Mazúrquica modérnica" (Violeta Parra) 2:21
9. "Volver a los Diecisiete" ("return to seventeen") (Violeta Parra) 4:18
10. "Rin del angelito" (Violeta Parra) 2:03
11. "Una copla me ha cantado" (Violeta Parra) (duet with Alberto Zapicán) 3:56
12. "El guillatún" (Violeta Parra) 2:29
13. "Pastelero, a tus pasteles" (Violeta Parra) 1:53
14. "De cuerpo entero" (Violeta Parra) 1:39
