= Félix Luna =

Argentine historian and writer (1925–2009)

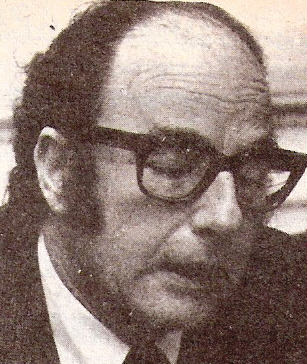
- Luna in 1976
- Born: Félix César Luna; 30 September 1925
- Died: 5 November 2009 (aged 84); Buenos Aires, Argentina
- Education: University of Buenos Aires
- Occupations: Historian; writer; lyricist
- Awards: Ordre national du Mérite; Konex Award

Félix César Luna (30 September 1925 – 5 November 2009) was an Argentine writer, historian, lyricist and cultural official. He wrote extensively on Argentine political history and published biographies of figures including Hipólito Yrigoyen, Marcelo Torcuato de Alvear and Julio Argentino Roca. In 1967, he founded the history magazine Todo es Historia, which he directed until his death.

Luna also collaborated with composer Ariel Ramírez on several musical works, including Mujeres Argentinas and Cantata Sudamericana, and wrote the lyrics to the song Alfonsina y el mar. He served as Secretary of Culture of Buenos Aires from 1986 to 1989 and received several Konex Awards for his work as a historian, biographer and lyricist.

== Life ==
Luna was born in Buenos Aires to a family originally from La Rioja in 1925. A grandfather had founded the La Rioja chapter of the newly established centrist Radical Civic Union (UCR) in 1892, and an uncle, Pelagio Luna, had been Vice President of Argentina for President Hipólito Yrigoyen, between 1916 and 1919. He enrolled at the University of Buenos Aires and earned a law degree in 1951. He was first published in 1954 with his biographical work Yrigoyen. Opposed, as most in the UCR were, to the populist President Juan Perón, Luna, after the 1955 overthrow of Perón, was appointed Director of the Ministry of Labor's Employee Benefits Plan in 1956. Luna received his first literary prize in 1957 for his period tale La fusilación (The Firing Squad); set in the nineteenth century, the work followed the controversial 1956 execution of General Juan José Valle and 27 others. This was followed by a biography of Marcelo Torcuato de Alvear, Yrigoyen's chief rival within the UCR, in 1958.

He taught as Professor of the History of Institutions at his alma mater's law school between 1963 and 1976, and Contemporary History Professor at the private University of Belgrano between 1967 and 1986. Some of his best-known works from this period were Los caudillos, a look at provincial strongmen of the 19th and early 20th centuries (1966), El 45, referring to the pivotal year 1945 in Argentina (1968), and Argentina: de Perón a Lanusse, an overview of the tumultuous generation between Perón's 1945 advent and 1973.

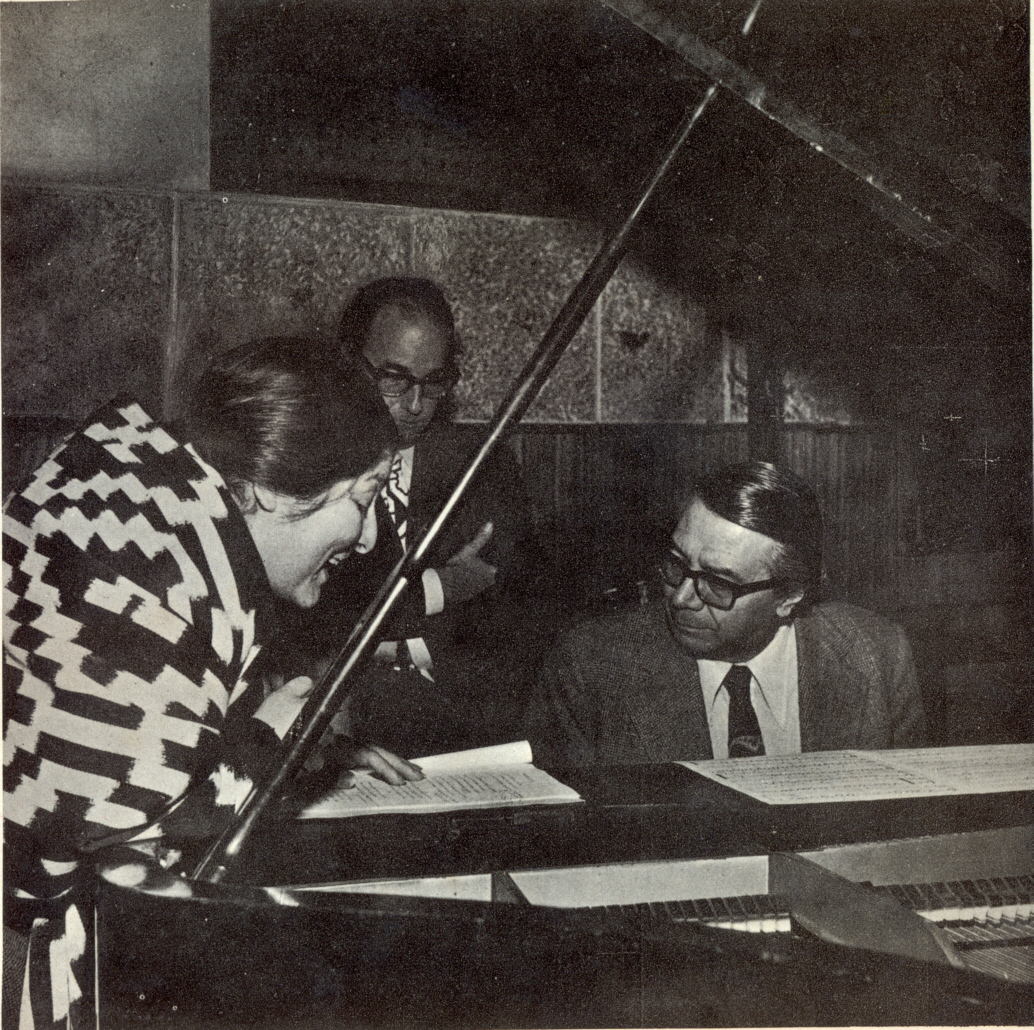
Vocalist Mercedes Sosa, Luna, and composer Ariel Ramírez at work in 1972

Luna collaborated with pianist and composer Ariel Ramírez as a lyricist for the Misa Criolla (Creole Mass), in 1964. This joint success was followed by Mujeres Argentinas (Argentine Women), in 1969, among whose themes Alfonsina y el mar (an ode to the ill-fated poet Alfonsina Storni) became particularly well-known. Ramírez and Luna were joined by traditional folklore vocalist Mercedes Sosa for Cantata Sudamericana, a 1972 album which made the latter an iconic figure in the music of Argentina.

As a historian, contributed weekly editorials on current events for Clarín between 1964 and 1973, and as host of Hilando nuestra historia (Weaving Our History), an educational radio program, between 1977 and 1982. Offering up biographies on Presidents Roberto Ortiz (1978) and Julio Roca (Soy Roca, 1989), a comprehensive trilogy on the Perón years, and the pocket Breve historia de los argentinos (Brief History of the Argentines, 1993), among other books, he became known for his narrative style and pragmatic viewpoint on contentious events.

He founded an Argentine history monthly, Todo es Historia (Everything is History), in 1967 and continued to direct the publication until his death. Luna has been honored with numerous Konex Awards, the highest distinctions in the Argentine cultural realm, since 1984 for his work as a historian, biographer and lyricist, as well as a French Ordre national du Mérite in 1988. He was Secretary of Culture for the city of Buenos Aires in 1986–89. He died in Buenos Aires on November 5, 2009.
