= Camino del Indio =

Studio album by Atahualpa Yupanqui
- Released: 1955
- Genre: Argentine folk
- Label: Odeon

Atahualpa Yupanqui chronology
Una Voz y una Guitarra (1953)	Camino del Indio (1955)	Guitarra... Dimelo Tu (1957)

Camino del Indio is both a song and an album by Argentine singer and guitarist Atahualpa Yupanqui.

== The song ==
The song was written by Yupanqui in the 1920s, though he did not record it until 1936. It is one of Yupanqui's most famous and analyzed songs. It has been described by multiple sources as "a classic" of Argentine music.

The lyrics describe the path of Argentina's indigenous people, a winding path strewn with stones, singing in the hills, crying in the river. One analyst wrote that the song "painted a nostalgic landscape very different from cynical, urban tango lyrics, invoking the timelessness of indigenous Argentina." Another writer described the song as poignant in its depiction of "a rural path as the window through which we see the sufferings of the Indian of the campo, or countryside."

== The album ==
The album was Yupanqui's second. It was originally released in 1955 on the RCA Victor label.

All of the songs on Camino del Indo were written by Yupanqui. The album includes songs recorded by Yupanqui earlier in his career. It was the No. 1 album in Argentina in 1955.

The album has been released internationally with editions in Spain, Mexico, Peru, and Puerto Rico. It was released in some countries under the name "The art of Atahualpa Yupanqui". It was reissued on compact disc in 1995 under the title "Camino del Indio, his first hits."

In a 2024 ranking by music critics of the 600 greatest Latin American albums, Camino del Indio was ranked No. 29.

== Track listing ==
Side A

1. "Camino Indio" (Atahualpa Yupanqui)
2. "Zambita del Alto Verde"
3. "Cencerro"

Side B

1. "Indiecito Dormido"
2. "Danza de la Paloma Enamorada"
3. "El Alazan"
4. "El Arriero"
