= Alfredo Gutiérrez (musician) =

Colombian musician (born 1943)

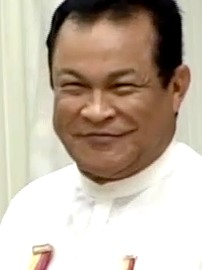

Background information
- Also known as: Rebelde del Acordeón
- Born: Alfredo de Jesús Gutiérrez Vital; April 17, 1943 (age 82); Paloquemao, Sucre, Colombia
- Years active: 1951–present

Alfredo de Jesús Gutiérrez Vital (born April 17, 1943), known as Alfredo Gutiérrez, is a Colombian accordion player, composer, bandleader, and singer. He was a founding member of Los Corraleros de Majagual, and led the group until 1965. He later released albums with Los Caporales Del Magdalena, with his band the Estrellas, and as a solo artist. Gutiérrez won the accordionist competition of the Vallenato Legend Festival (and was crowned "vallenato king") three times. He is known for his ability to play the accordion with his feet.

== Biography ==
Alfredo Gutiérrez was born on April 17, 1943 in the village of Paloquemao, Sucre to Alfredo Enrique Gutiérrez Acosta, an accordion player, and Dioselina de Jesús Vital Almanza, a cumbia dancer. Gutiérrez learned accordion from his father. At the age of 8 he played with Arnulfo Briceño in the duo Los Pequeños Vallenatos in Bucaramanga, with whom he recorded records for labels Turpial (Venezuela), Onix, and Rondador (Ecuador).

Sometime in 1959–1961 Gutiérrez founded Los Corraleros de Majagual alongside Calixto Ochoa, César Castro and Eliseo Herrera. Gutiérrez left Los Corraleros in 1965, and was replaced on the accordion by Lisandro Meza. Gutiérrez formed his own group called Alfredo Gutiérrez y sus Estrellas, with whom he recorded more than 60 albums, mostly for Discos Fuentes and Sonolux.

Notable compositions by Alfredo Gutiérrez include the songs "Festival en Guararé", "Ojos Indios", "El Envenenao", and "La Trabajadora".

== Awards and recognition ==
=== The Vallenato Legend Festival ===
Gutiérrez participated in the accordion competition of the Vallenato Legend Festival for the first time in 1969. He told El Heraldo that he withdrew early from the competition because he felt that Consuelo Araújo, organiser of the festival, disliked him, which she denied. Gutiérrez went on to win the competition in 1974, 1978, and 1986.

=== Others ===
Gutiérrez has won three Golden Congos at the Barranquilla Carnival, and several other awards in Mexico and Venezuela. He twice won the World Accordion Championship in Germany. His album El Más Grande con Los Grandes was nominated for "Best Cumbia/Vallenato Album" at the 2007 Latin Grammy Awards.

=== In popular culture ===
Gutiérrez appeared in the documentary film El Acordeón del Diablo (2000) from German director Stefan Schwietert.
