= Eliseo Herrera =

Colombian singer, musician, and songwriter

- Born: Eliseo Herrera Junco; 14 June 1925; Cartagena, Colombia
- Died: 5 March 2016 (aged 90) Cartagena, Colombia
- Children: 17

Eliseo Herrera Junco (1925–2016) was a Colombian singer, musician, and songwriter. He wrote over 120 songs and was a member of Los Corraleros de Majagual.

== Biography ==
Herrera was born on 14 June 1925 in Cartagena, Colombia. His parents were Eufrosina Junco and Genaro Herrera. As a young man he was a dockworker for Empresa Puertos de Colombia (Colpuertos), from whom he continued to draw a pension later in life.

Herrera started singing in 1940, and his musical career began with the Sonora Cordobesa. His first recorded songs were "La Chula" and "La Matica de Mafafa", which were hits on the radio. In the early 1960s he joined Los Corraleros de Majagual.

One of Herrera's final performances was at the Jorge Eliécer Gaitán Theatre in Bogotá in 2007. He died on 5 March 2016 in Cartagena.

== Personal life ==
Herrera's partner was Ana Isabel Corpas, with whom he had nine children, the oldest Celmira being born when the couple were around 15. Herrera simultaneously had a long-term relationship with Romelia Vega, with whom he had six children. He had two other children, for a total of seventeen.

== Musical style and compositions ==
Herrera wrote over 120 songs in the genre of tropical music, with notable examples including: "La Burrita", "El Vampiro", "La Adivinanza", "Tamborito de Carnaval", "Tres Tristes Tigres", "Tingo al Tango", "La Yerbita", "La Matica de Mafafa", "Pájaro Picón Picón", "Culebra Cascabel" and "La Bonga".

Several artists recorded versions of Herrera's compositions, including Wilfrido Vargas, Juan Luis Guerra, and Billo's Caracas Boys. "La Burrita" was recorded by Franck Pourcel and Georges Jouvin.
