= Lisandro Meza =

Colombian musician (1937–2023)

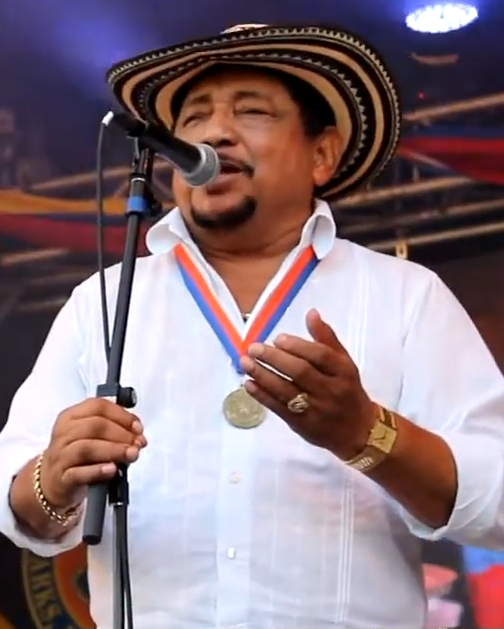
- Meza performing in 2016

Background information
- Born: September 26, 1937
- Died: December 23, 2023 (aged 86)
- Instrument: accordion
- Years active: 1954–2023

Lisandro Meza Márquez (26 September 1937 – 23 December 2023) was a Colombian singer and accordionist. After he started playing the accordion in 1959, Lisandro was described as the "King of Cumbia," "El Macho de América" (English: The man of the Americas) and the "Master of Vallenato Sabanero." Meza was once part of the group, Los Corraleros de Majagual in 1962, which was a successful band in both Colombia and Venezuela.

== Life and career ==
Lisandro Meza was born in El Piñal, Los Palmitos, Sucre, Sucre, Colombia on 26 September 1937. He started to sing and learned to play the accordion with his father, known as "La Armenia", in 1954. His first record was Aroma de las Flores, recorded in the same year.

In 1961, Meza joined Los Corraleros de Majagual, a very well-known group which was popular in both Colombia and Venezuela. During his time with the Group, he recorded 41 LPs. He also declared that the name of the band had been changed to "Combo Gigante." In 1967, he renamed his group "Lisandro Meza y Su Conjunto" with its Album Release, "Fiesta Sabanera."

Known as "Lisandro Meza y Su Conjunto" between 1967 and 1994, his music is known for its eclectic style with Dominican Merengue, Louisiana Zydeco, and Tex-Mex Norteño music. His music was inspired by many famous artists and musicians such as Los del Río, Aterciopelados, Alberto Barros, Aniceto Molina, and many more artists. Most of his music is prominent outside of Colombia, mainly in Peru, Mexico, the Southern Cone, North America, Europe, and China.

In 1979, he established his band, "Los Hijos De La Niña Luz," where it included himself and his seven sons. Most of his recordings were made in Barranquilla, Colombia.

Grandson Duey Meza is a Reggaeton singer.

Meza died in Sincelejo, Sucre on 23 December 2023, at the age of 86.

== On Media ==
'Te llevaré' (1980) & 'Lejanía' (1982) gained popularity on Internet after both songs were referenced in the 2019 Mexican film, Ya No Estoy Aquí

== Select discography ==
=== Albums ===
- Cocacolo Cabello (1957?)
- Mosaico Doble Cero (1960)
- El Tigre del Acordeón (1960)
- El Brujo Del Acordéon (1960)
- Alegría Sabenera (1964)
- El Ritmo del Acordéon (1964)
- Fiesta Sabanera (1967)
- Upa Je (1969)
- Rey Sin Corona (1969)
- Siguen las Fiestas (1970)
- Salsita Mami (1970)
- En Nueva York (1970)
- Fiesta en Mi Pueblo (1970)
- El Grande (1971)
- El Chacho Del Acordeón (1971)
- La Hija de Amaranto (1972)
- El Accordion Pitador De Lisandro Meza (1973)
- El Negrito (1973)
- El Dios Cantor (1974)
- El Campeón Mundial del Acordeón (1975)
- El Burro Leñero (1976)
- La Botella Picomocho (1977)
- Lisandro 78 (1978)
- El Innocente (1978)
- El Sabanero (1978)
- Lisandro Meza (Colmusica, 1978)
- Sigo Pa' Lante (1979)
- El León Del Acordeón (1980)
- El Muchacho Alegre (1980)
- Canción para una Muerte Anunciada (1981)
- De Tal Palo Tal Astilla (1982)
- Lejanía (1982)
- ¡Riiico...! (1982)
- Solo Cumbias (1983)
- Estás Pillao (1983)
- ¿Y de la Plata Que? (1984)
- Mi Carrito (1985)
- El Sabroso (1986)
- Alejo Y Yo (1986)
- La Lay Del Ta (1986)
- Lisandro Mezacladito (1986)
- Grandes Exitos con... Lisandro Meza y Su Conjunto (1986)
- Mezacladito Vol. 2 (1987)
- El Sabanero Mayor (1987)
- ¡Aquí! (1988)
- Mamando Gallo (1988)
- Mezacladito Vol. 3 (1989)
- El Mandamás (1989)
- Soy Colombiano (1990)
- Alas De Olvido (1990)
- Internacionales (1990)
- De Fiesta por el Mundo (1991)
- Mucho Lisandro Para Colombia Vol. 1 (1991)
- Amor Lindo (1991)
- Lisandro's Cumbia (1991)
- Lisandro Meza y su Conjunto (Discos Fuentes, 1992)
- Infinito (1992)
- El Goool (1992)
- Mucho Para Colombia, Vol. 1 (1993)
- Lisandro's Cumbia (Kinex, 1993)
- 20 Grandes Éxitos (1993)
- El Macho (1993)
- Cumbias Colombianas (1994)
- El Sabanero Mayor (1994)
- Mi Razon de Ser (1995)
- El Mago del Accordion (1995)
- A Punta de Maíz (1995)
- La Suegra (1995)
- Por Que Usted Lo Ha Pedido (1996)
- Pa'l Mundo (1996)
- De Parranda en Mi Casa Vol. 2 (1997)
- Solo Por Ti (1997)
- Benditas Mujeres (1998)
- En Vivo (1998)
- Grandes Exitos (1999)
- El Sabanero (El Sananero Mayor) (1999)
- Lisandro Meza: Éxitos Originales (1999)
- De Parranda en Mi casa. Vol. 1 (2000)
- Los Super Éxitos De Lisandro Meza (2000)
- El Embajador (2001)
- El Sabanero Mayor (Hay Amores que Matan) (2001)
- Con Mucho Sabor...! (2002)
- Pa’ Todo el Mundo (2003)
- Un Mundial De Éxitos (2003)
- El Rey Sabanero (2004)
- Su Majestad (2005)
- Navidades con Lisandro Meza (2006)
- Para Politico No (2007)
- ¿Por Que No Te Callas? (2008)
- Colección de Oro (2009)
- La Univerisidad de la Cumbia (2010)
- Los Triple (2014)
- Sueño Americano (2016)
- Exitos Colombianos (2017)
- De Parranda en Mi Casa Vol. 3 (2018)
- 63 Años de Vida Artística (2020)

=== Albums on which Meza appears ===
- ¡Grito Parrandero! (1966, Los Corraleros de Majagual)
- Rtimo de Colombia (1967, Los Corraleros de Majagual)
- Nuevos Éxitos!! (1967, Los Corraleros de Majagual)
- Nuevo Ritmo..! (1968, Los Corraleros de Majagual)
- En Nueva York (1968, Los Corraleros de Majagual)
- Los Corraleros (1968, Los Corraleros de Majagual)
- Nuevo Tumbao (1969, Los Corraleros de Majagual)
- ¡Ésta si es Salsa! (1970, Los Corraleros de Majagual)
- Mi Clemencia (1976, Los Corraleros de Majagual)
- Todo El Año Es Carnaval (1979, Aníbal Velásquez)
- Fiesta Costeña (1980, Los Hijos de la Niña Luz)
- Vol. 2 (1980, Los Hijos de la Niña Luz)
- Arrincónala (1981, Los Hijos de la Niña Luz)
- Banda Los Hijos de la Niña Luz (1982)
- Pura Pendejá (1983, Los Hijos De la Niña Luz)
- Carnaval de La Niña Luz (1984, Los Hijos de la Niña Luz)
- Con La Muela Pela' (1990, Los Hijos de la Niña Luz)
- La Escapada (1990, Los Hijos de la Niña Luz)
- Barranquilla de Caché (1992, Los Hijos de la Niña Luz)
- Llegaron los Meza (2016, Duey Meza)
- Con el Mismo Tumbao (2017, Joche Meza)
- Llegaron Los Meza (Version 2) (2020, Duey Meza)
- Evolucionar o Morir (2022, Duey Meza)
