= Gracias a la vida =

Song of the chilean singer-songwriter Violeta Parra

Song by Violeta Parra

from the album Las últimas composiciones
- Recorded: 1966
- Genre: Folk; Nueva canción chilena
- Length: 4:38
- Label: RCA Victor

Las últimas composiciones chronology
"Gracias a la vida"	"El albertio"

"Gracias a la vida" (Spanish: "Oh Life, Thank You") is a song written, composed and performed by Chilean folk singer-songwriter Violeta Parra, one of the artists who was part of the movement and musical genre known as the Nueva Canción Chilena. Parra composed "Gracias a la vida" in La Paz, Bolivia, in 1966. It was included on Las Últimas Composiciones, the last album Parra released before dying by suicide in 1967. It is one of Parra's most renowned songs; it is performed throughout the world and remains one of the most covered Latin American songs in history.

== Critical reception ==
The song "Gracias a la vida" has been termed a "humanist hymn" by Chilean music journalist Marisol García. In 2009 the former president Michelle Bachelet expressed her "affection and admiration" for Mercedes Sosa and "Gracias a la vida" with the following phrase: «As you know today, "Gracias a la vida" is a song of ours, but also a universal one. Note that there are many artists from many countries who have recorded it and made it famous and one of those voices, perhaps the most vigorous in Latin America, is that of Mercedes Sosa». In 2013 it was inducted into the Latin Grammy Hall of Fame.

== Covers ==
The 1971 version performed by Mercedes Sosa and included on her album Homenaje a Violeta Parra popularized the song within the Spanish-speaking world. Joan Baez made the song known in the United States in 1974 by including it on her album of the same title, and continued to perform the song in concert in various countries. Italian singer-songwriter Gabriella Ferri covered the song in her 1974 album Remedios, making it popular with the Italian public. Chilean-American actress and singer Cote de Pablo recorded a cover to be included in the soundtrack of the 2015 biographical drama film The 33. In 2021, American singer Kacey Musgraves covered the song for her fifth studio album Star-Crossed. It also has been covered by cellist Yo-Yo Ma, mezzosoprano Elīna Garanča, and Cuban singer Omara Portuondo, among many others.

== Voces Unidas por Chile version ==
"Gracias a la Vida"

Single by Voces Unidas por Chile
- Released: 4 May 2010
- Recorded: March 2010
- Genre: Pop
- Length: 4:31
- Label: Warner Bros.
- Songwriter: Violeta Parra
- Producer: Humberto Gatica

Music video
- "Gracias a la Vida" on YouTube

In 2010, "Gracias a la Vida" was recorded by the supergroup Voces Unidas por Chile. It was produced by Chilean producer Humberto Gatica, and released on 4 May, one week before another charity single for the event, "Que Cante la Vida", performed by various artists too including Alex Ubago, Belinda, Carlos Baute, Aleks Syntek, Luis Fonsi, among others.

The project by Beto Cuevas, former vocalist of the group La Ley, consisted of recording a version of "Gracias a la Vida" to help the victims of the 2010 earthquake, was produced by the Chilean compatriot Humberto Gatica, they also included artists such as: Colombians Shakira and Juanes, Dominican Juan Luis Guerra, Mexican Fernando Olvera (Fher), Spanish Alejandro Sanz and Miguel Bosé, Italian Laura Pausini, and Canadian Michael Bublé.

"We are committed to the Chilean people, which is facing a big problem", said the former vocalist of Maná in a video with statements of all participating artists and images of the tragedy. Miguel Bosé said in his segment: "Anything that has to be done for that country, I will always do it." Laura Pausini, referring to the previous year's earthquake in the Abruzzo region, said: "Last year, my land, Italy, experienced a similar tragedy to which Chile is experiencing".

Warner Music released the song internationally in both physical and digital format. The profits from their sale went to Habitat for Humanity, which works to provide housing to families in need in various countries, including Chile.
