= Mercedes Sosa =

Argentine singer (1935–2009)

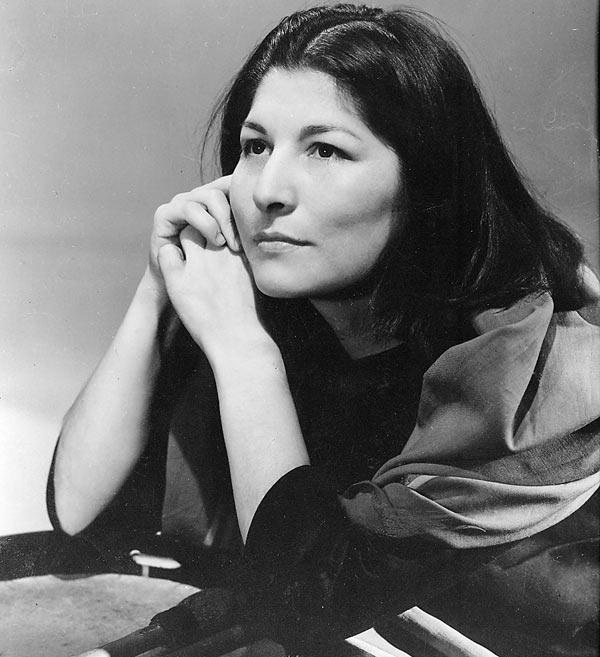
- Portrait by Annemarie Heinrich, 1960s
- Born: Haydée Mercedes Sosa; 9 July 1935; San Miguel de Tucumán, Tucumán, Argentina
- Died: 4 October 2009 (aged 74); Buenos Aires, Argentina
- Occupation: Singer
- Years active: 1950–2009
- Musical career
- Genres: Folk; nueva canción
- Instruments: Vocals

Haydée Mercedes Sosa (9 July 1935 – 4 October 2009) was an Argentine singer who was popular throughout Latin America and many countries outside the region. With her roots in Argentine folk music, Sosa became one of the preeminent exponents of the nuevo cancionero ('new songbook') movement. She gave voice to songs written by many Latin American songwriters. She was hailed as the "voice of the voiceless ones", and often called "the conscience of Latin America".

Sosa performed in venues such as the Lincoln Center in New York City, the Théâtre Mogador in Paris, the Sistine Chapel in Vatican City, as well as sold-out shows in New York's Carnegie Hall and the Roman Colosseum during her final decade of life. Her career spanned four decades and she was the recipient of six Latin Grammy awards (2000, 2003, 2004, 2006, 2009, 2011), including a Latin Grammy Lifetime Achievement Award in 2004 and two posthumous Latin Grammy Award for Best Folk Album in 2009 and 2011. She won the Premio Gardel in 2000, the main musical award in Argentina. She served as an ambassador for UNICEF.

== Life ==
Sosa was born on 9 July 1935, in San Miguel de Tucumán, in the northwestern Argentine province of Tucumán, of mestizo ancestry. She was of French, Spanish and Diaguita descent. Her nickname "la Negra", which is a common nickname in Argentina for people with darker complexion, is a reference to her indigenous heritage. Her parents, a day laborer and a washerwoman, were Peronists, although they never registered in the party, and she started her career as a singer for the Peronist Party in Tucuman under the name Gladys Osorio. In 1950, at age fifteen, she won a singing competition organized by a local radio station and was given a contract to perform for two months. She recorded her first album, La voz de la zafra, in 1959. A performance at the 1965 Cosquín National Folklore Festival—where she was introduced and brought to the stage while sitting in the audience by fellow folk singer Jorge Cafrune— brought her to the attention of the Argentine public. Sosa and her first husband, Manuel Oscar Matus, with whom she had one son, were key players in the mid-60s nueva canción movement (which was called nuevo cancionero in Argentina). Her second record was Canciones con Fundamento, a collection of Argentine folk songs.

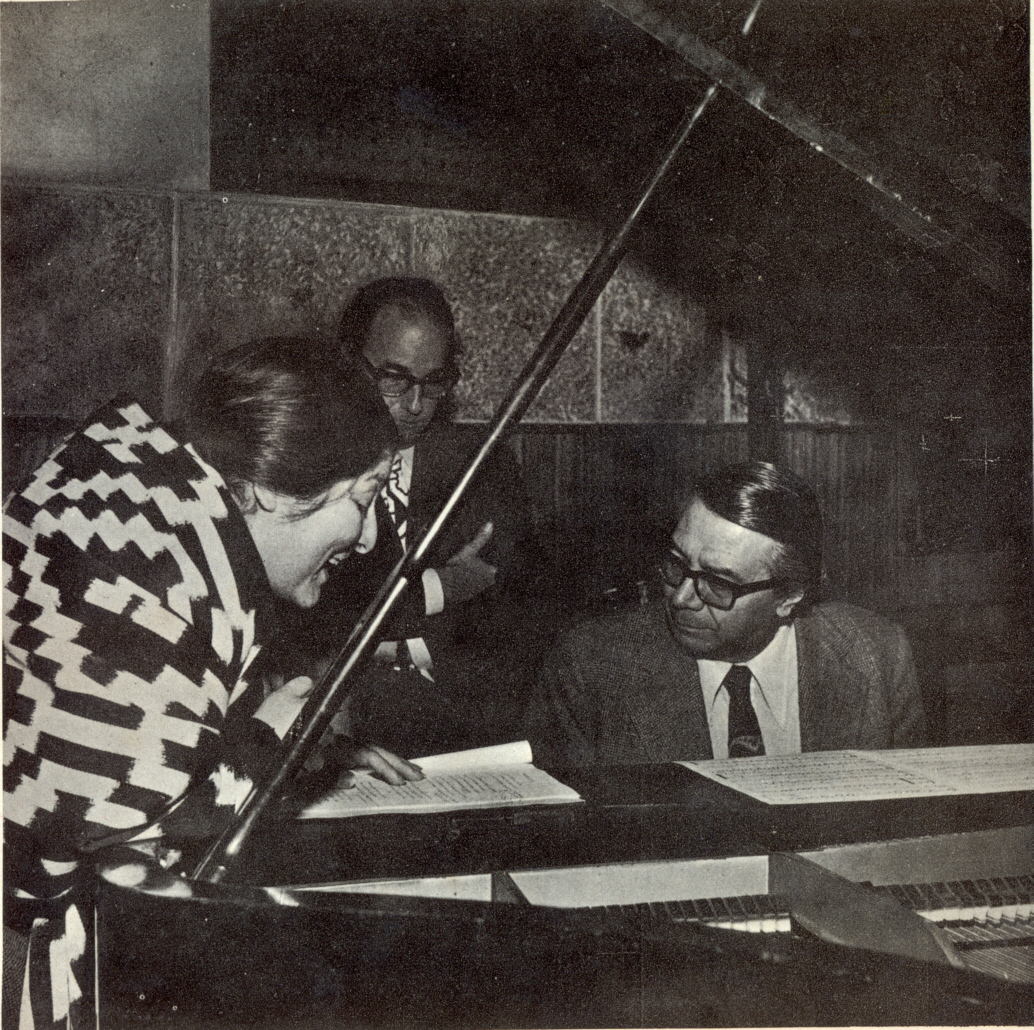
Sosa with Félix Luna and Ariel Ramírez (at the piano)

Sosa "spent the late 1960s building her audience in Europe and among the cosmopolitan middle class in Buenos Aires, becoming in the process a much bigger star" than her contemporaries. In 1967, Sosa toured the United States and Europe with great success. In later years, she performed and recorded extensively, broadening her repertoire to include material from throughout Latin America.

In the early 1970s, Sosa released two concept albums in collaboration with composer Ariel Ramírez and lyricist Félix Luna: Cantata sudamericana and Mujeres argentinas ('Argentine Women'). She also recorded a tribute to Chilean musician Violeta Parra in 1971, including what was to become one of Sosa's signature songs, "Gracias a la vida". She further popularized of songs written by Milton Nascimento of Brazil and Pablo Milanés and Silvio Rodríguez both from Cuba. Throughout the decade, she released albums such as Hasta la Victoria in 1972 and Traigo un Pueblo en mi Voz in 1973. They featured songs like "Cuando tenga la tierra", written by Ariel Petrocelli and Daniel Toro, which tackles political and social issues like wealth and land inequality. During the 1970s she was a part of two films by the director Leopoldo Torre Nilsson: El Santo de la Espada in 1970 and Güemes, la tierra en armas in 1971, in which she portrayed Juana Azurduy de Padilla, the guerrilla military leader who fought for Argentine independence.

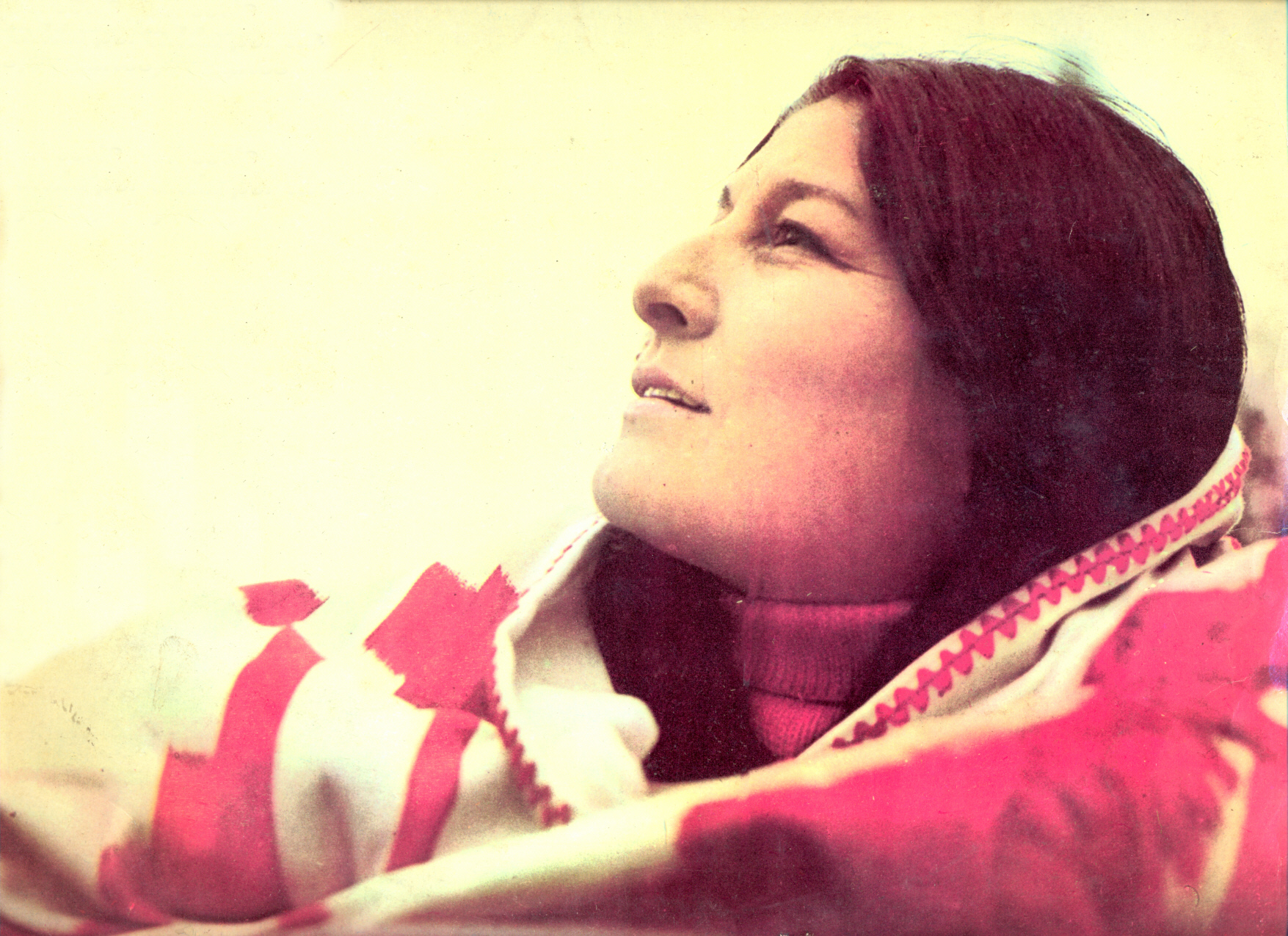
Sosa in 1972

After the military junta of Jorge Videla came to power in 1976, the atmosphere in Argentina grew increasingly oppressive. Sosa faced death threats against both her and her family, but refused for many years to leave the country. At a concert in La Plata in 1979, Sosa was searched and arrested on stage, along with all those attending the concert. Their release came about through international intervention. Despite attempts to hold more concerts, she was officially barred from performing by the military regime. Banned in her own country, she moved to Paris and then to Madrid. She has spoken publicly about her artistic and emotional struggles during this period of her life. While in exile, she released the album A quien doy in 1981. The album included a recording of the song "Cuando me acuerdo de mi país" which was originally written by the prolific Chilean singer/songwriter, Patricio Manns. The song, which he wrote while also in political exile, expresses the sorrow he felt from being separated from his homeland. She related to this feeling and struggled to continue recording and performing. In an interview with the New York Times, she said, "It was a mental problem, a problem of morale...It wasn't my throat, or anything physical".

Sosa returned to Argentina from her exile in Europe in February 1982, several months before the military regime collapsed as a result of the Falklands War, and gave a series of concerts at the Teatro Ópera in Buenos Aires, where she invited many of her younger colleagues to share the stage. A double album of recordings, Mercedes Sosa en Argentina, from these performances became an instant best seller. She then traveled to perform in her home province of Tucuman. However, these performances were largely ignored by mainstream media in the country. In subsequent years, Sosa continued to tour both in Argentina and abroad, performing in such venues as the Lincoln Center in New York City and the Théâtre Mogador in Paris. In poor health for much of the 1990s, she performed a comeback show in Argentina in 1998. In 1994, she played in the Sistine Chapel in Vatican City. In 2002, she sold out both Carnegie Hall in New York and the Colosseum in Rome in the same year.

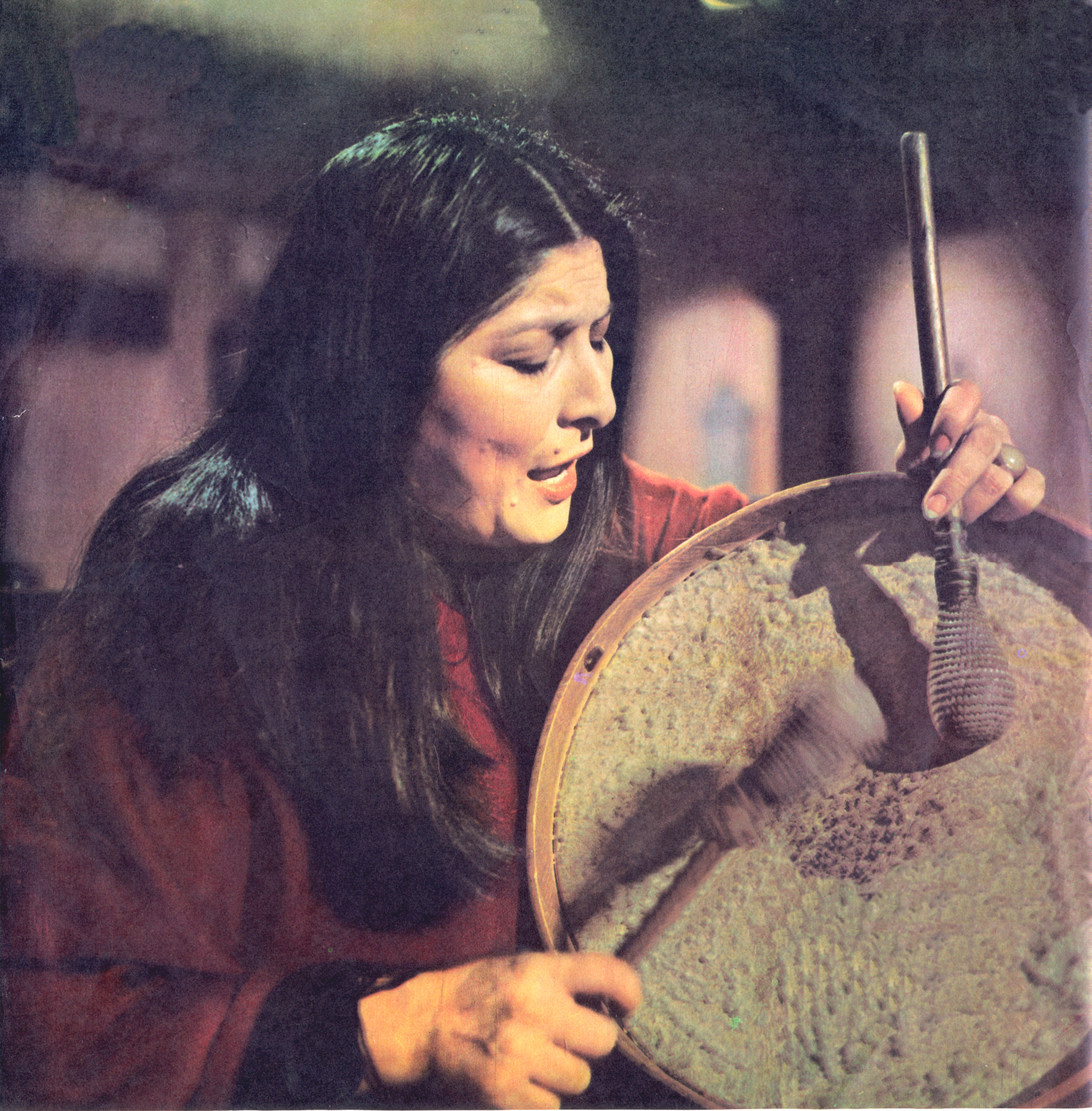
Sosa in 1973

A supporter of Perón, she favored leftist causes throughout her life. She supported President Raul Alfonsin in the election of 1983 which marked the return of democracy in Argentina following the dictatorship. She referred to this election as "Argentina's Spring" She opposed President Carlos Menem, who was in office from 1989 to 1999, and supported the election of Néstor Kirchner, who became president in 2003. Sosa was a UNESCO Goodwill Ambassador for Latin America and the Caribbean.

Sosa disliked being identified as a protest singer. While she was outright in her political stances, Sosa said the following on the position of the artist:

"An artist isn't political in the party political sense – they have a constituency, which is their public – it is the poetry that matters most of all."

In a career spanning four decades, she worked with performers across several genres and generations, folk, opera, pop, rock, including Martha Argerich, Andrea Bocelli, David Broza, Franco Battiato, Jaime Roos, Joan Baez, Francis Cabrel, Gal Costa, Luz Casal, Lila Downs, Lucio Dalla, Maria Farantouri, Lucecita Benitez, Nilda Fernández, Charly Garcia, León Gieco, Gian Marco, Nana Mouskouri, Pablo Milanés, Holly Near, Milton Nascimento, Pata Negra, Fito Páez, Franco De Vita, Lourdes Pérez, Luciano Pavarotti, Silvio Rodríguez, Ismael Serrano, Shakira, Sting, Caetano Veloso, Julieta Venegas, Gustavo Cerati and Konstantin Wecker

Sosa participated in a 1999 production of Ariel Ramírez's Misa Criolla. Her song "Balderrama" is featured in the 2008 movie Che, starring Benicio del Toro as the Argentine Marxist revolutionary Che Guevara.

Sosa was the co-chair of the Earth Charter International Commission.

== Awards ==
Sosa won the Latin Grammy Award for Best Folk Album in 2000 (Misa Criolla), 2003 (Acústico), 2006 (Corazón Libre), 2009 (Cantora 1, which also won Best Recording Package and was nominated for Album of the Year), and 2011 (Deja La Vida Volar), as well as several international awards.

In 1995, Konex Foundation from Argentina granted her the Diamond Konex Award, one of the most prestigious awards in Argentina, as the most important personality in the popular music of her country in the last decade.

== Death ==
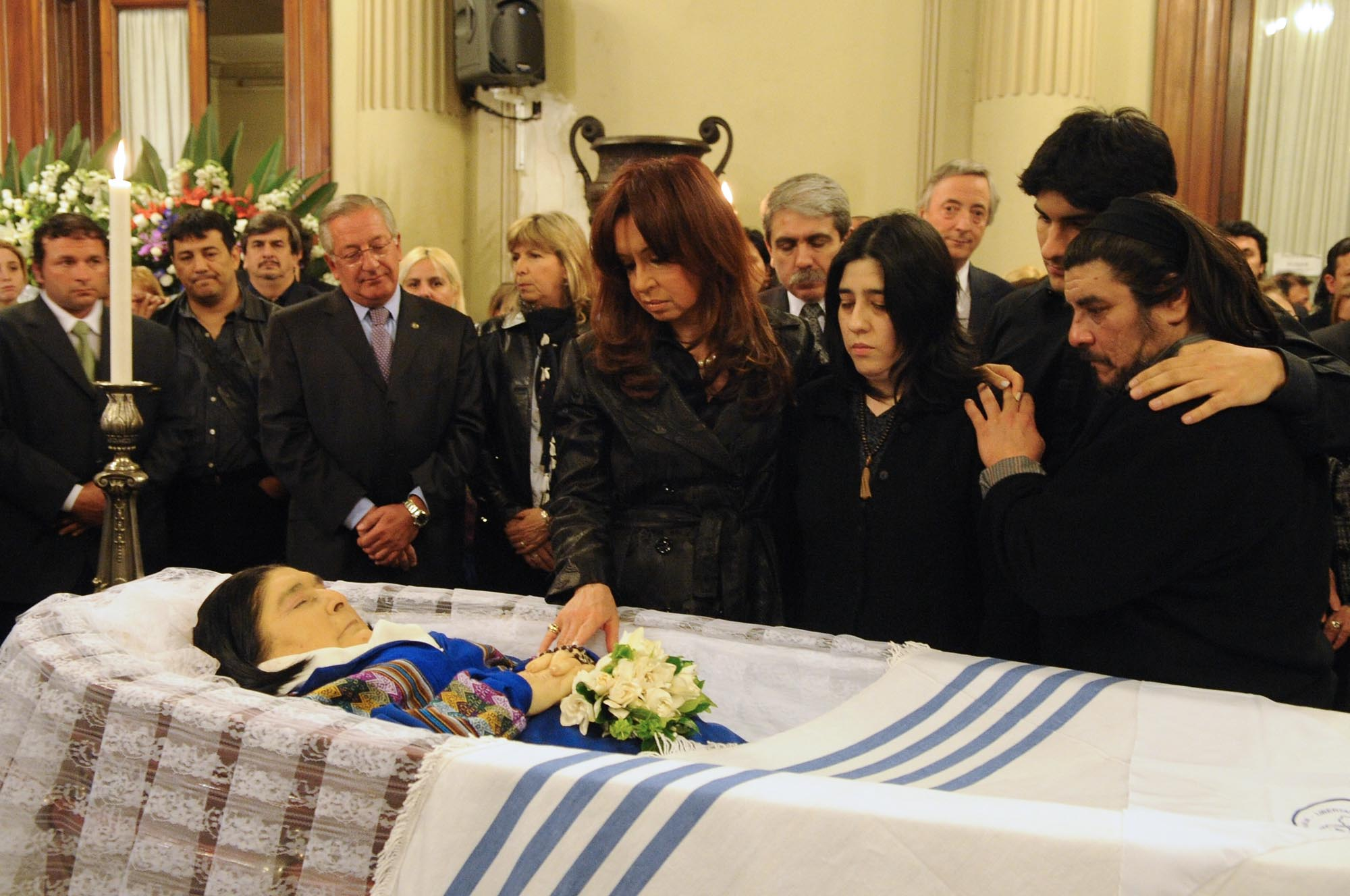
Mercedes Sosa lying in repose, with her family and President Cristina Fernández de Kirchner viewing

Suffering from recurrent endocrine and respiratory problems in later years, the 74-year-old Sosa was hospitalized in Buenos Aires on 18 September 2009. She died from multiple organ failure on 4 October 2009, at 5:15 am. She was survived by one son, Fabián Matus (d. 15 March 2019), born of her first marriage. He said: "She lived her 74 years to the fullest. She had done practically everything she wanted, she didn't have any type of barrier or any type of fear that limited her". The hospital expressed its sympathies to her relatives. Her website featured the following: "Her undisputed talent, her honesty and her profound convictions leave a great legacy to future generations".

Her body was placed on display at the National Congress building in Buenos Aires for the public to pay their respects, and President Fernández de Kirchner ordered three days of national mourning. Thousands had queued by the end of the day.

Sosa's obituary in The Daily Telegraph said she was "an unrivalled interpreter of works by her compatriot, the Argentine Atahualpa Yupanqui, and Chile's Violeta Parra". Helen Popper of Reuters reported her death by saying she "fought South America's dictators with her voice and became a giant of contemporary Latin American music". Sosa received three Latin Grammy nominations for her album, in 2009 . She went on to win Best Folk Album about a month after her death.

== Tributes ==
In 2019, Sosa was celebrated by a Google Doodle. The doodle was showcased in Argentina, Chile, Uruguay, Paraguay, Bolivia, Peru, Ecuador, Cuba, Iceland, Sweden, Serbia, Greece, Israel and Vietnam.

In 2023, Rolling Stone ranked Sosa at number 160 on its list of the 200 Greatest Singers of All Time.

== Discography ==
Sosa recorded forty albums.

=== Studio albums ===
Year	Album details
1962	La Voz de la Zafra: Label: RCA
1965	Canciones Con Fundamento: Label: El Grillo
1966	Hermano: Label: Philips
1966	Yo No Canto Por Cantar: Label: Philips
1967	Para Cantarle a Mi Gente: Label: Philips
1968	Con Sabor a Mercedes Sosa: Label: Philips
1969	Mujeres Argentinas: Label: Philips
1970	El Grito de la Tierra: Label: Philips
1970	Navidad con Mercedes Sosa: Label: Philips
1971	Homenaje a Violeta Parra: Label: Philips
1972	Hasta la Victoria: Label: Philips
1972	Cantata Sudamericana: Label: Philips
1973	Traigo un Pueblo en Mi Voz: Label: Philips
1975	A Que Florezca Mi Pueblo: Label: Philips
1976	En Dirección Del Viento: Label: Philips
1977	Mercedes Sosa Interpreta a Atahualpa Yupanqui: Label: Philips
1979	Serenata Para la Tierra de Uno: Label: Philips
1981	A Quien Doy / Cuando Me Acuerdo de Mi País: Label: Philips
1982	Como Un Pájaro Libre: Label: Philips
1983	Mercedes Sosa: Label: Philips
1984	¿Será Posible el Sur?: Label: Philips
1985	Vengo a Ofrecer Mi Corazón: Label: Philips
1986	Mercedes Sosa '86: Label: Philips
1987	Mercedes Sosa '87: Label: Philips
1993	Sino: Label: Philips/Polygram
1994	Gestos de Amor: Label: Polydor
1996	Escondido en Mi País: Label: Polydor
1997	Alta Fidelidad (w/Charly García): Label: Mercury
1998	Al Despertar: Label: Mercury
1999	Misa Criolla: Label: Mercury
2005	Corazón Libre: Label: Edge
2009	Cantora 1 (w/various artists): Label: RCA
2009	Cantora 2 (w/various artists): Label: RCA
2011	Censurada: Label: Philips
2015	Lucerito: Label: RCA

=== EPs ===
Year	EP details
1967	Juanito Laguna remonta un barrilete: Label: Philips
1975	Niño de Mañana: Label: Philips

=== Live albums ===
Year	Album details
1973	Si Se Calla El Cantor (with Gloria Martin): Label: Philips
1980	Gravado Ao Vivo No Brasil: Label: Philips
1982	Mercedes Sosa en Argentina: Label: Phonogram/Philips
1985	Corazón Americano (with Milton Nascimento & León Gieco): Label: Philips
1989	Live in Europe: Label: Tropical Music/Polygram Argentina
1991	De Mí: Label: Philips
2002	Acústico en Vivo: Label: Sony Music Argentina
2003	Argentina Quiere Cantar (with Víctor Heredia & León Gieco): Label: Odeon/EMI
2010	Deja la Vida Volar (En Gira): Label: RCA
2014	Angel: Label: Universal Music
2024	En vivo en el Gran Rex 2006: Label: INAMU Discos
2024	Mercedes Sosa en Nueva York, 1974: Label: Sony Music Argentina

=== Compilation albums ===
Year	Album details
1975	Disco de Oro: Label: Philips
1983	Recital: Label: Philips
1988	Amigos Míos: Label: Philips
1993	30 Años: Label: Polygram Argentina
1995	Oro: Label: Polygram
1997	The Best of Mercedes Sosa: Label: Mercury
2013	Siempre en Ti: Label: Universal Music

== Filmography ==
- Güemes, la tierra en armas (1971)
- Argentinísima (1972)
- Esta es mi Argentina (1974)
- Mercedes Sosa, como un pájaro libre (1983)
- Será possible el sur: Mercedes Sosa (1985)
- Historias de Argentina en vivo (2001)
