= Los Corraleros de Majagual =

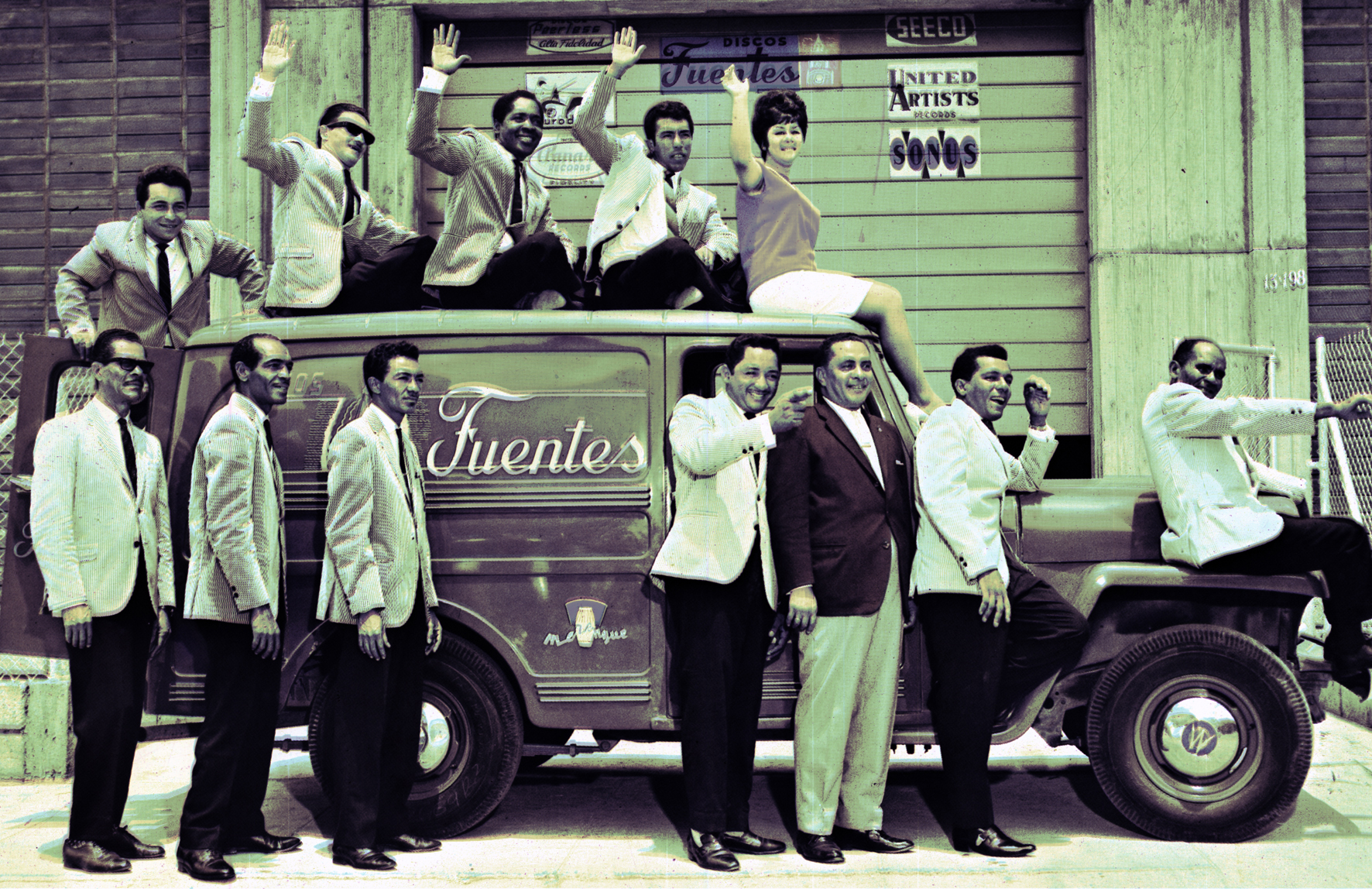
- Los Corraleros de Majagual

Background information
- Origin: Sincelejo (Colombia)
- Occupation: Musical group

Los Corraleros de Majagual is a Colombian music group from the Caribbean coast. The group, which has recorded songs in the cumbia, porro, vallenato, and other Latin genres, has received over 30 gold records.

The group began in 1961 when Calixto Ochoa and Alfredo Gutiérrez met with Antonio Fuentes Estrada, owner of the Discos Fuentes record label. The group proposed a project of folk music in a rural context based on the accordion and the guacharaca. Fuentes named the group Los Corraleros de Majagual.

Over the years, the size of the group expanded, and "many of Colombia's biggest cumbia stars earned their stripes" playing with the Corraleros. In its larger configurations, the band "featured plenty of brass and percussion and generous helpings of high-octane squeeze box."

== First hits ==
The first hits of this group were Ana Felicia, Culebra Cascabel, El Tamarindo, Festival en Guararé, Guepajé, Hace un Mes, La Adivinanza, La Burrita, La India Motilona, La Manzana, La Palma de Coco, La Paloma Guarumera, Los Sabanales, Tres Punta, etc.

== Discography ==
- Alegre Majagual (1962)
- Los Corraleros de Majagual (1962)
- Volumen III (1962)
- Volumen IV (1963)
- Volumen V (1963)
- Pin Pan Pumm (1964)
- Mujeres Costeñas (1965)
- Aquí Están (1965)
- Lamento Cumbiambero Con Los Corraleros De Majagual (1965)
- Titiguay (1965)
- ¡Nos Fuimos! (1966)
- Nuevo Ritmo...! (1966)
- ¡Grito Parrandero! (1966)
- Siguela, Siguela (1967)
- Nuevos Éxitos de Los Corraleros (1967)
- Ritmo de Colombia (1967)
- Los Corraleros en Nueva York (1968)
- Nuevo Ritmo..! Vol. II (1968)
- Candela Verde (1968)
- Nuevo Tumbao (1969)
- ¡Ésta Si Es Salsa! (1970)
- Quemando (1970)
- Mejor Que Te Vayas (1970)
- Y Siguen Bateando (1971)
- Corralerisimo (1973)
- Somos Los Corraleros (1973)
- Volvimos (1974, Alfredo Gutierrez Y Los Corraleros de Majagual)
- ¡Nos Fuimos! (1975)
- Los Corraleros de Majagual (1975)
- Cumbia Corralera (1976)
- Los Tipicos Corraleros de Majagual (1977)
- Cumbias Colombianas (1977, Aniceto Molina y Los Corraleros)
- Nos Fuimos y Volvimos (1978)
- El Pollito (1978)
- Los Corraleros de Majagual En Accion (1979)
- La Pollera Colorá - Grandes Hits (1979)
- Al Son De Las Corralejas (1980)
- En Todo Su Furor (1981)
- Los Corraleros y Su Cumbia Salsera (1982)
- Señora Bonita (1983)
- A Todo Color Con Glasurit (1984, Aniceto Molina y Los Corraleros)
- El Poder de Los Corraleros de Majagual (1986)
- Epoca Dorada (1986)
- Regresaron En Grande (1988)
- Del Majagual a Mexico (1988)
- Epoca de Oro (1988)
- ¡Arriba! (1990)

== See also ==
- Los Corraleros de Majagual on Spanish Wikipedia
