= Acabou Chorare =

Studio album by Novos Baianos
- Released: 1972
- Recorded: 1972
- Studios: Cantinho do Vovô, Rio de Janeiro, Brazil
- Genres: MPB; Samba rock; tropicália
- Length: 39:29
- Label: Som Livre
- Producers: Eustáquio Sena; João Araújo

Novos Baianos chronology
É ferro na boneca (1970)	Acabou Chorare (1972)	Novos Baianos F.C. (1973)

Alternate cover
- 1992 CD version

Acabou Chorare (Brazilian Portuguese pronunciation: [akaˈbow ʃoˈɾaɾi], 'No More Crying') is the second studio album by Brazilian rock and MPB group Novos Baianos. The album was released in 1972 by Som Livre, following the group's moderately successful debut É Ferro na Boneca (1970). During the recording of the album, the group took inspiration from various contemporary artists of the time, such as Jimi Hendrix, João Gilberto, and Assis Valente. In addition, Gilberto heavily influenced the sound of the album, as he served as the group's mentor during the album's recording sessions. The album was written and recorded as a response to contemporary Brazilian music of the 1970s, which often dealt with melancholic subject matters, due in part to the ongoing Brazilian military dictatorship.

Acabou Chorare is a MPB, samba rock and tropicália album with elements of frevo, baião, choro, afoxé and rock and roll. These elements were influenced by João Gilberto, who introduced them to Brazilian musical traditions, incorporating those elements into their sound while maintaining rock energy. Guitarist Pepeu Gomes contributed virtuosic solos and experimented with custom-built instruments and distortion techniques. Moraes Moreira's guitar style also evolved, shifting from rock strumming to the intricate plucking characteristic of samba and bossa nova.

The album has received several awards and nominations from publications. In 2007, Acabou Chorare was ranked first in the list of 100 greatest albums of Brazilian music by the Brazilian Rolling Stone magazine. It was also nominated in the Discoteca Básica podcast, being voted as the second greatest album of Brazilian music. In September 2012, it was voted the eight best Brazilian album, tied with the self-titled album by Secos & Molhados by the audience of Eldorado FM radio, the Estadão.com portal and Caderno C2+Música (the latter two belonging to the O Estado de S. Paulo newspaper). In July 2024, it was ranked in the 22nd position on the "Los 600 de Latinoamérica" list compiled by a collective of music journalists from several countries of the Americas, curating the top 600 Latin American albums from 1920 to 2022.

== Background ==
Under the influence of countercultural movements, members of Novos Baianos—Pepeu Gomes, Paulinho Boca de Cantor, Baby Consuelo, Moraes Moreira, Luiz Galvão, Jorginho Gomes, Dadi Carvalho, José Roberto and Luís Bolacha—recorded their first album, É Ferro na Boneca (1970), in the city of São Paulo. They first performed together in Salvador, Bahia in 1969, in the show Desembarque dos bichos depois do dilúvio, alongside the band of brothers Pepeu and Jorginho Gomes, who was the drummer. In 1971, they moved to Rio de Janeiro, initially sharing a penthouse before moving to a communal farm along the road to Jacarepaguá, Rio de Janeiro called the Cantinho do Vovô, where they would later record Acabou Chorare. Before this, seeking musical guidance in their new city, Galvão reached out to João Gilberto, whom he had known since his adolescence in Juazeiro, Bahia. Gilberto promised to visit them in Botafogo, Rio de Janeiro, stating, "I always dreamed of having a group where everyone lived together. I always dreamed of that. I never managed to do it". Regarding the move to Jacarepaguá, Paulinho Boca explained, "We ended up leaving downtown because we were too conspicuous, standing out. Everyone had long hair, people were giving warnings. It was better to find a quiet, natural place with greenery". Paulinho and Moraes were even arrested in a warehouse due to their long-haired appearance but were soon released. Their hippie lifestyle was reflected in their music. The first album featured songs, among many by the group, that included references to drug use, but it was not subject to censorship by the military regime. The title track, for instance, includes the lines "Look at the product in the baggage" and "It's not a road, it's a trip..."

"João Gilberto quickly went to mingle with the then frenetic and wild rockers... Novos Baianos! Without fear, without prejudices of any kind. With no intention other than human contact with those who were — apparently — his opposites, João was welcomed with open arms and guitars by Joãozinho Trepidação, Baby Consuelo, Paulinho Boca de Cantor, and the rest of the team."

— Nelson Motta, 1980.

At one point, while the group was living in an apartment in Botafogo, they received an unexpected visitor. Dressed in a suit and tie, he rang the doorbell, prompting Dadi Carvalho to initially suspect it was law enforcement. However, the visitor was João Gilberto—a fellow Bahian who would become a key musical and spiritual mentor to Novos Baianos. His visits were frequent, even in Jacarepaguá; he himself said he went there with his wife Miúcha and their young daughter Bebel Gilberto "for a stroll, and took the opportunity to listen to what the crazy guys were playing, composing, inventing [...]". His influence, combined with Novos Baianos' interest in tropicália, choro, afoxé, trio elétrico and Jimi Hendrix, contributed to the group's evolving musical style. Galvão recalls that, for Novos Baianos, João Gilberto introduced them to "the real samba of Assis Valente" and advised them, alongside the proposal to record "Brasil Pandeiro", "to turn inward themselves".

I find it interesting to talk about how we arrived at this alchemy. After I discovered Hendrix, I got to know João Gilberto, who introduced me to Jacob do Bandolim and Waldir Azevedo.

— Pepeu Gomes

Several authors argue that it was precisely João Gilberto's presence that inspired the creation of Acabou Chorare. The album's title itself emerged from a conversation among them, recounting how his daughter, Bebel Gilberto, as a young child, mixed Portuguese with Spanish she heard while living in Mexico with her parents. She often used the phrase when she fell or bumped into something and cried, prompting her father and the rest of the family to chase after her. When she stopped crying, she would say: "Acabou chorare, acabou chorare", which is a way of saying "no more crying" in baby talk. According to Galvão:

"I called João Gilberto to tell him I was writing lyrics [for "Acabou Chorare"] about this relationship with the 'little bee.' João told me: 'Phenomenal! I was talking to the poet Capinan, and he recalled that the bee kisses the flower and makes honey, and I liked it and added: E ainda faz zun-zun [And it still goes buzz-buzz]. I asked João: 'Can I use that?' He approved, saying: 'You must'. It didn't stop there. João told me that Bebel, his daughter, when they lived in Mexico, had taken a bump [...] and he, worried, rushed over with the anguish of a father in such moments. But Bebel reacted courageously and, in her childlike innocence, spoke a language still forming, calming him: No, acabou chorare".

As Ricardo Azevedo wrote, "to the ears of Novos Baianos, that was enough to turn into music". And, as Baby recalls, "Coming from the mouth of a child, it showed that we had cried too much. We wanted the joyful Brazil back". After recording all the tracks in a rough and improvised manner at Polygram, following Nelson Motta's suggestion to record them at Jorge Karan's house, they ended their association with the label. They later secured the support of producer Eustáquio Sena and João Araújo, owner and director of Som Livre, later known as the father of Cazuza, who financed the recording of Acabou Chorare and contributed to the group's career development.

== Recording and production ==
Under such influence, Acabou Chorare was composed and recorded. At the Jacarepaguá farm, the entire band lived together with other relatives and friends, embracing a communal lifestyle associated with the hippie movement; The number of residents was large enough to organize regular soccer games in the late afternoons, which led them to create the team Novos Baianos F.C. and release the post-Acabou Chorare album with that very title, Novos Baianos F.C. (1973). As Moreira recounts, "We might lack money for food, but we always had enough to buy marijuana and sports equipment". The routine at the Cantinho do Vovô was simple. As Paulinho Boca recalls, "After breakfast, Galvão would go compose, Moraes would stay playing. We exercised a lot, went to the beach by bike. When the sun was setting, the 'baba' would start", he says, referring to the Bahian nickname for soccer games. The album cover, a wooden table built by Pepeu, shows scattered plates and cups, disorganized cutlery and pans, flies, and flour, symbolizing the musical "mixture" and the communal spirit of the group at the farm. In 1972, it received the award for Best Graphic Production of the Year; the artwork is credited to Antônio Luis Martins, better known as "Lula", the protagonist of the cult movie Meteorango Kid - O Herói Intergalático (1970), directed by André Luiz de Oliveira.

The musical direction of the album took a total of two years to develop, with the group composing, rehearsing, and refining the album, while João Gilberto provided tips and suggestions. According to Moraes Moreira, it was natural to live, produce, and share everything within the farm's community: "It was something that happened within the chaos we lived in. [...] We didn't close the bedroom door to compose. It was right there in the middle of everyone, in the joy. We believed that this would influence our music. And it did. [...] For us, life was the rehearsal. When we went to record Acabou Chorare, everything was already under our fingers from daily rehearsals. You listen and realize the album was recorded in four tracks". Despite feeling unquestionably inferior to their mentor, the musicians of Novos Baianos took pride in occasionally "stealing" João's chords. They displayed impressive virtuosity, particularly in tuning—at a time when tuners were not readily available—playing a combination of acoustic and electric instruments with precise tuning. According to Moraes, this was because, even though they adopted unconventional behaviors and experimented with substances like LSD, music remained a serious pursuit for them. Paulo César Salomão, the sound technician, lived in a section of the property near the decommissioned chicken coop and the communal shower. He spent late nights studying electronics and, since there were no resources to purchase new parts for the album's guitars, he enhanced the sound of the Supersonic guitar by carving into the instrument and attaching capacitors removed from the family's television set, which was left unguarded on the farm.

The "television trick", as it became known, is particularly notable in the "buzzing stridency" of "Bilhete Para Didi" and the solo of "Mistério do Planeta". Salomão also showed his resourcefulness by transforming the chicken coop into a studio, placing amplifiers and speakers on tree branches. Nearby, they took collective showers: "It wasn't everyone naked, full of lust", recalls Paulinho, "it was sex, drugs, and rock 'n' roll, but all at home. People said we were dirty, lice-ridden, but everyone showered every day and smelled nice. We had one meal a day, 'almojanta' [lunch-dinner], and then we'd go play. That's when we created the most". Dadi Carvalho reveals that they rarely went out: "Despite the success of the songs on the radio, there weren't many shows, so money was tight. And at the farm, there were a lot of people living there [...] many mouths to feed and little money. That wasn't a problem because we had so much fun, living philosophically. Discovering a new way of life was the focus". Even the money earned from performances was put into a bag behind the kitchen door, for everyone to use as needed. With their unconventional lifestyle, they managed to win the support of João Araújo, owner and director of Som Livre, later known as the father of Cazuza, who financed the recording of Acabou Chorare at the Cantinho do Vovô and boosted the career of Novos Baianos.

== Composition ==
=== Overview ===
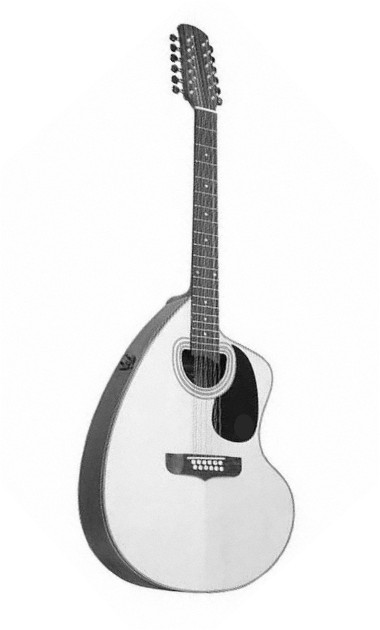
The craviola, a 12-string instrument designed by Paulinho Nogueira, was used in Acabou Chorare alongside cavaquinhos and electric guitars.

The album mostly incorporates elements of samba rock, a fusion of samba and rock music. It was also defined by critics as a tropicália and MPB record. According to Galvão, "samba back then was something only for university students. Really bad, because university students don't know how to make real samba. So we were born anti-samba". However, through João Gilberto, the group, which had previously played heavier, electric music, began incorporating samba into their sound. The album features cavaquinhos, Brazilian percussion, and electric guitars. That is, a fusion of choro and samba instruments (cavaquinho and violões) with guitars, and a João Gilberto-inspired touch of bossa nova.

Novos Baianos were not the first to blend the energy of rock with samba rhythms. The cover by Os Mutantes of the song "A Minha Menina" from the self-titled album, originally by Jorge Ben Jor, also had the same intention. But they were the first to orient an entire album in this direction. Gilberto also introduced the Novos Baianos to musicians like Ary Barroso, Herivelto Martins, and Noel Rosa, and the group successfully combined the teachings of the father of bossa nova with their rock influences. The genres and rhythms frevo, baião, choro, afoxé and rock and roll were adapted to the group's vocal style and, although diverse rhythms coexist alongside cavaquinhos and electric guitars in the album. As Moraes Moreira explains:

We were influenced by rock, listening a lot to Jimi Hendrix, Janis Joplin, all those bands from the 70s. But it was there, with João Gilberto, that we woke up to samba. When he showed us 'Brasil Pandeiro' by Assis Valente – it's time for this bronzed people to show their worth – we understood his message. We started incorporating cavaquinhos, pandeiros, all of that into our sound, without losing the rock edge. It was samba with rock energy. That's what made Novos Baianos stand out. We made the album Acabou Chorare, and it was a milestone.

In addition to the influence of João Gilberto, the virtuoso guitarist Pepeu Gomes also adopted choro as one of his greatest inspirations, partly thanks to a mandolin gifted to him by Paulinho da Viola. Gomes also appears on the album playing the craviola, a 12-string instrument designed by the Brazilian guitarist Paulinho Nogueira, which he uses in Acabou Chorare to deliver notable solos alongside cavaquinhos and electric guitars. As is known, sound technician Paulo César Salomão used parts from the television at the Cantinho do Vovô to help Pepeu achieve distorted sounds on the guitar; in fact, since the age of 14, Pepeu had been dedicated to building instruments like the "guibando" (a fusion of guitar and mandolin) and the PG models, made with Roger Meyer, Hendrix's guitar technician. Another notable stylistic observation on this album, a result of the productive relationship with Gilberto and a point of comparison with É Ferro na Boneca (1970), concerns how Moraes Moreira plays the guitar: while on the 1970 single the guitarist strummed the strings like a rocker, activating all the notes of each chord at once, as in "Globo da Morte", from Acabou Chorare onward, it is noticeable that he began plucking the strings, as sambistas and even João Gilberto did.

=== Songs ===
Moraes Moreira and Pepeu Gomes served as arrangers for the songs, with the former also playing rhythm guitar and singing, and the latter handling the craviola and electric guitar; when not the lead singer, Baby Consuelo played maracas, triangle, and afoxé; Dadi Carvalho played electric bass, while Paulinho Boca de Cantor used his voice and played the pandeiro, and Jorginho Gomes played drums, cavaquinho, and bongo.

The track that opens the album, "Brasil Pandeiro", was a suggestion by João Gilberto and is a song that, alongside "Recenseamento", had been composed by Assis Valente for his muse Carmen Miranda, who was returning to Brazil in 1940. Carmen recorded the second song but dismissed "Brasil Pandeiro", saying: "Assis, this is no good. You've gone crazy". The composer, hurt, did not understand the reasons, especially since he considered the song to be of good quality, and even more so after Anjos do Inferno found success with it. Comparable to "Aquarela do Brasil", which even shares a rhythmic motif in the accompaniment repeated in Valente's song, intended to mimic the tamborim, "Brasil Pandeiro" shows that the choice of the pandeiro as an instrument while using it as an adjective for the nation elevates the batucada to the level of a relevant cultural value, belonging to the domain of the characters of the samba world. It was the first (and only) song on the album not written by the group that they recorded.

"Preta Pretinha" is a six-minute ballad composed by Moreira with lyrics by Galvão, written for a girl he met in Niterói. According to him, "The young woman arranged for me to go to Niterói to meet her father, and on the way back, she would come live with me in the Novos Baianos' apartment in Botafogo. We took the ferry, I met her father, but on the way back, she changed her mind and returned to her boyfriend. That night, I wrote the lyrics under the impact of that failure, and surely my subconscious gave a panoramic view of all my love stories". It is considered a modinha (a traditional Brazilian love song) inspired by traditional verses of cana-verde (a folk dance), a song and dance from the interior of the Southeast and Central-West of Brazil, initially danced in a circle and composed of often improvised stanzas without a chorus. The choir's participation in the verses "eu ia lhe chamar / enquanto corria a barca" [I was going to call you / while the ferry ran], and the singer's octave leap, created a mini-chorus of great effect that contributed to the song.

"Tinindo Trincando", the third track on the album, features an expressive opening guitar solo, followed by Baby's sweet and lively vocals, which return later even more intense. According to Pepeu Gomes, "it's my first fully personal, Brazilian solo, a truly Brazilian guitar, a samba swing thing". Although he is referring only to the improvisation part, it is necessary to look at the texture panoramically to draw less superficial conclusions about how each element fits into the musical arrangement. The creation of this song's solo took some time: "I spent several days concentrating; meditating, really, searching deep within myself for who I was, how I could truly play. Then, I went into the studio and recorded it in one take. And to this day, I think it's one of the best solos".

"Swing de Campo Grande" is considered a samba de salão, with lyrics referencing Carnival and carrying a mystical tone. A music guide by David Bowman and Paul Terry highlights its distinctive guitar sound. According to Boca de Cantor, the song's lyricist, the military dictatorship suspected Novos Baianos of being "terrorists disguised as hippies" and began monitoring them. He once met a healer who advised calm and assured him, "You are good people. Evil will not set its eyes on you". The healer then taught him the charm that ended up in the song's lyrics: "When you receive the evil eye, turn into a 'stump,' turn into a 'bush' ". For the group, this symbolized blending in, evading highway police, and focusing inward, managing to go five years without paying the Motor Vehicle Tax for their car.

The title track, "Acabou Chorare", is explicitly influenced by João Gilberto, almost an imitation of his aesthetic and voice, and carries a strong trace of bossa nova, while its lyrics are partly inspired by a story he told the group about his daughter, Bebel Gilberto. "Mistério do Planeta" and "A Menina Dança" are typical MPB songs, both featuring beautiful electric guitar work by Pepeu Gomes. The latter, as Baby explains, was written especially for her: "The lyrics say that 'everything was turned upside down' and that I arrived 'after exhausting the allotted time.' It meant that at a time when fabulous singers like Elis Regina and Gal Costa were booming, I brought my own unique style". "Besta É Tu" is a lively samba whose title alludes to the name still known in popular circles in Bahia for an old method of learning the guitar, whose initial exercise produces sounds that, through repetition, suggest the onomatopoeia "besta é tu/besta é tu" [you're a fool/you're a fool]. The lyrics of this song were also considered a true representation of "desbunde" [counterculture] and a call to abandon old ideals and embrace the world. The instrumental "Um Bilhete para Didi" transforms a typical Brazilian rhythm into an electric sound. The track is named after Jorginho's youngest brother. The last track on the album is a reprise of "Preta Pretinha", edited by Som Livre to be shorter for radio accessibility. However, in the end, "the most played was the longer version", Moraes Moreira would recall years later.

== Critical reception ==
Professional ratings
Review scores
Source	Rating
AllMusic	4.5/5 stars
Uncut	8/10

Acabou Chorare was met with mostly positive acclaim from various music critics. Several reviewers noted the strong influence from João Gilberto of the album. Alvaro Neder gave the album a score of four and a half out of five stars on AllMusic and wrote that Novos Baianos' second album "displays a strong influence from João Gilberto". He described it as an exploration of the group's compositions in both acoustic and electric settings, marked by "freshness and originality". Matt Mitchell from Paste Magazine hailed the album as "a perfect blending of samba rock and tropicália" that emerged during Brazil's military dictatorship, offering "hopeful" lyrics. He described the album as "full of passion and one-of-a-kind, sun-soaked easy-listening", calling it "danceable and sublimely remarkable". He concluded that the record is "a well-oiled machine embroidered with intoxicating glee and romance".

Uncut's Jim Wirth gave the album an 8 out of 10 and described Novos Baianos as "a Brazilian analogue to Fairport Convention" who evolved from a West Coast-influenced rock band into a group incorporating "indigenous samba, forró and baião styles" under the guidance of João Gilberto. Wirth highlighted "Mistério do Planeta" as a blend of "Astrud Gilberto introspection" with "Marquee Moon['s] art rock". Marcus Preto from Rolling Stone Brasil wrote that Acabou Chorare was "the masterpiece of Novos Baianos", born from the group's encounter with João Gilberto, whose influence led them to embrace samba. Preto described Acabou Chorare as the result of a "collision" between Novos Baianos and João Gilberto, who introduced them to "Brasil Pandeiro" and encouraged them to "turn inward". Sérgio Luz, writing for O Globo, noticed the album's "amalgam of genres and musical references", blending "the samba of Assis Valente", "the distortion of Jimi Hendrix's rock", "the baião of Luiz Gonzaga" and "the bossa nova of João Gilberto".

Despite receiving little critical attention at the time of its release, Acabou Chorare has been the subject of increasing scholarly discussion since the 1990s, with works by authors such as Marcos Napolitano (2005), Jairo Severiano (2008), and Ana Maria Bahiana (2006). The album has also been recognized in various rankings and polls by news publications. In 2007, through votes from producers, journalists, and music scholars, the work was ranked as the greatest Brazilian album of all time in the list of the 100 greatest Brazilian music records by the Brazilian edition of Rolling Stone, In September 2012, it was voted by the audience of Eldorado FM, the Estadao.com portal, and the Caderno C2+Música (the latter two belonging to the newspaper O Estado de S. Paulo) as the eighth greatest Brazilian album of all time, tied with the self-titled album by Secos & Molhados. In May 2022, the album was voted as the second Greatest Brazilian Album of All Time by the Discoteca Básica podcast. In June 2024, Paste Magazine ranked Acabou Chorare number 51 on its list of the 300 greatest albums of all time. In July 2024, it was ranked in 22nd position on the "Los 600 de Latinoamérica" list compiled by a collective of music journalists, highlighting the top 600 Latin American albums from 1920 to 2022.

=== Commercial performance ===
"In a time when Brazil was sad and gray, we would show up with the greatest joy, singing songs like: 'Besta é tu, besta é tu'. No one really understood that. And João would say: 'Look how beautiful Brazil is.' No one was seeing that Brazil. Only him. We started to embrace that Brazil."

— Moraes Moreira, 2010.

Acabou Chorare was also commercially successful and remained on the charts for over thirty weeks. Novos Baianos gained prominence in the Brazilian cultural scene and participated in the Carnival of Salvador. They performed on top of trio elétrico, incorporating their voices and keyboards into the sound of Carnival. Although they later had disagreements with Som Livre, the album contributed to their recognition, leading to performances at various shows and festivals across Brazil. Major newspapers covered their work, and they received praise from Caetano Veloso and Gilberto Gil.

"Preta Pretinha" received significant radio airplay, contributing to the LP selling 150,000 copies. However, the album did not immediately receive the "due" attention from critics. According to some authors, as had also happened with other artists like Walter Franco, Raul Seixas, and Raimundo Fagner, who were inspired by foreign sounds but created new forms of essentially Brazilian music, this was due to the fact that they were "heralds of the first changes and attempts to digest foreign influences". Regarding the issue of critical dismissal, as Marcus Preto wrote in Rolling Stone Brasil in 2007, "any merit that was not given to the excellence of Acabou Chorare when the album was released would eventually be duly reconsidered over time".

== Legacy ==
Acabou Chorare is one of the notable works that blended elements of modern music and "universal rock" with Brazilian popular music. The album incorporated elements that later appeared in rock and MPB in the following decades. By the late 1990s, the album had been cited as an influence on Brazil's musical scene, which had previously been dominated by 1980s rock. Artists such as Cássia Eller, Zélia Duncan, and Lobão incorporated samba elements into their music, with Lobão performing a duet with Elza Soares in 1986 on "A Voz da Razão" and using the drums of Mangueira in his work. At a time when foreign genres and sounds were dominant and Brazil had just transitioned from the 1980s rock movement, the album influenced female singers who incorporated samba into their work, such as Vanessa da Mata, Céu, Roberta Sá, Mariana Aydar, and Marisa Monte, the latter in 1996 covering "A Menina Dança" on her album Barulhinho Bom. João Gilberto, who influenced Acabou Chorare, incorporated elements of the album's style into his 1973 self-titled album, which featured minimalist percussion arrangements and rhythmic elements associated with Novos Baianos.

Many authors have written that Novos Baianos failed in their attempt to end the sea of sadness that plagued MPB and the nation with a joyful, jocular, ironic, and upbeat album, but, as Ana Maria Bahiana writes, Acabou Chorare did more for the health of Brazilian music and the country's morale than any political remedy. The album is also highly cherished by its members. Moreira, in 1995, released his Acústico da MTV with half of Novos Baianos' repertoire, arguing: "These are songs that transcend time". In 2009, Galvão proudly stated that "we were the joy in the midst of a terrible time".

The modus operandi and the working method proposed by the Novos Baianos—collective, hippie and without hierarchies—has influenced the 2000s generation, as this is how groups like +2, the Tribalistas, and Orquestra Imperial operated. The trend among bands and artists of newer generations is also to mix styles and genres. In this context, Acabou Chorare is a milestone of the post-Tropicalist period because it masterfully balances electric and acoustic sounds, even elevating samba to the level of classical music, as Tom Zé once proclaimed. This album cemented the Novos Baianos and their musical language, which synthesized João Gilberto, tropicália, and more traditional popular music.

== Re-releases ==
After its original release in 1972, the album was first released on CD in 1992 and was reissued over the years with alternate covers, such as in 2004, alongside other highly regarded albums from Som Livre. At the end of 2010, it was released on CD as part of the "Grande Discoteca Brasileira" collection by Estadão and Zero Hora, with an explanatory booklet written by Ricardo Moreira. In early 2011, catering to demanding consumers and collectors, Som Livre innovated by reissuing Acabou Chorare on a vinyl record again, nearly 40 years after its original release, at a higher cost and alongside two other acclaimed works from their catalog—Barão Vermelho (the group's debut, 1982) and A Voz, o Violão, a Música de Djavan (1976) by Djavan.

== Track listing ==
Acabou Chorare track listing
No.	Title	Writer(s)	Lead vocals	Length
1.	"Brasil Pandeiro"	Assis Valente	Baby Consuelo, Paulinho Boca de Cantor, Moraes Moreira	3:55
2.	"Preta Pretinha"	Moreira, Luiz Galvão	Moreira	6:37
3.	"Tinindo, Trincando"	Moreira, Galvão	Consuelo	3:24
4.	"Swing de Campo Grande"	Moreira, Galvão, Paulinho Boca de Cantor	Boca de Cantor	3:09
5.	"Acabou Chorare"	Moreira, Galvão	Moreira	4:13
6.	"Mistério do Planeta"	Moreira, Galvão	Boca de Cantor	3:37
7.	"A Menina Dança"	Moreira, Galvão	Consuelo	3:52
8.	"Besta É Tu"	Moreira, Galvão, Pepeu Gomes	Moreira	4:24
9.	"Um Bilhete Pra Didi"	Jorginho Gomes		2:52
10.	"Preta Pretinha"	Moreira, Galvão	Moreira	3:22
Total length:				39:29

== Personnel ==
According to Maria Luiza Kfouri and album's liner notes.

- Moraes Moreira – arrangements, vocals (tracks 1, 5, 8, 10) and classical guitar (tracks 1, 2, 4, 5, 10)
- Baby Consuelo – arrangements, vocals (tracks 1, 3, 7), afoxé (tracks 1, 4, 10), triangle (tracks 3, 9) and maracas (track 8)
- Paulinho Boca de Cantor – vocals (tracks 1, 4, 6) and pandeiro (tracks 1, 4, 8, 10)
- Pepeu Gomes – guitars (tracks 1, 3, 6, 7, 9) and craviola (tracks 1, 2, 4, 5, 8, 10)
- Luiz Galvão – lyrics
- Jorginho Gomes – cavaquinho (tracks 1, 4, 7–10), drums, bongos
- José Roberto – bass drum (track 1), bongos, drums
- Dadi Carvalho – electric bass (tracks 1–4, 6–10)
- Luís Bolacha – bongos
