= Rock in Rio =

Brazilian music festival

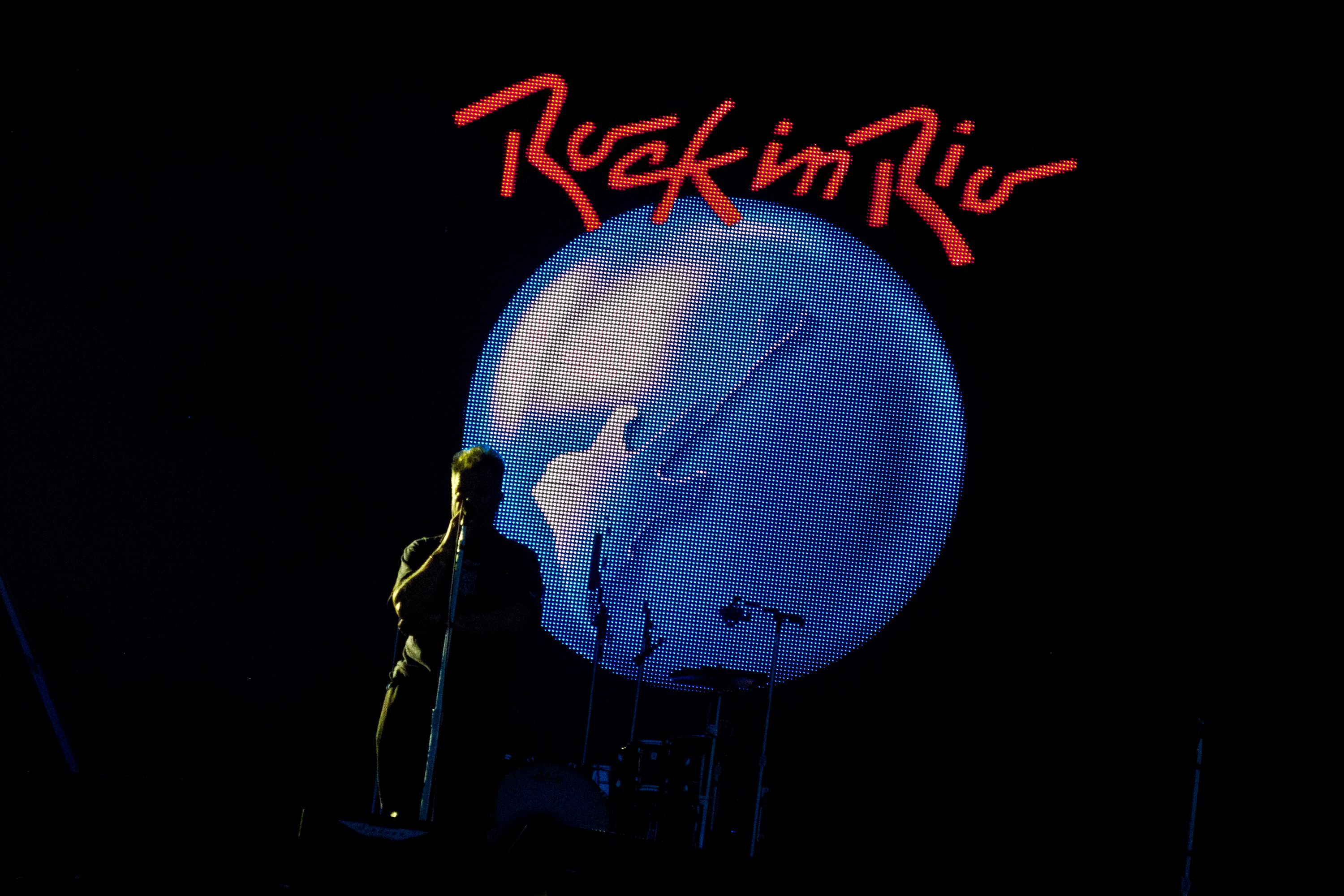
- Rock in Rio logo before a concert
- Genre: Various
- Locations: Rio de Janeiro, Rio de Janeiro, Brazil; Lisbon, Portugal; Madrid, Spain; Las Vegas, Nevada, United States
- Years active: 1985–present
- Founders: Roberto Medina
- Website: rockinrio.com

Rock in Rio is a biennial Brazilian multi-day music festival held at City of Rock in Rio de Janeiro. It later branched into other locations such as Lisbon, Madrid and Las Vegas.

Ten incarnations of the festival have been held in Rio de Janeiro, in 1985, 1991, 2001, 2011, 2013, 2015, 2017, 2019, 2022 and 2024; nine in Lisbon, in 2004, 2006, 2008, 2010, 2012, 2014, 2016, 2018 and 2022; three in Madrid in 2008, 2010 and 2012; and one in Las Vegas, in 2015. Brazilian entrepreneur and advertiser Roberto Medina was responsible for the inception and organization of the festival, as well as moving the 2004 edition to Lisbon, while controversially keeping the brand "Rock in Rio". In 2011, Rock in Rio returned to its original location, Rio de Janeiro, with a new line-up of singers and groups.

Rock in Rio is one of the largest music festivals in the world, with 1.38 million people attending the first event, 700,000 attending the second and fourth, about 1.2 million attending the third, and about 350,000 people attending each of the three Lisbon events.

In May 2018, Live Nation Entertainment acquired a majority stake in the festival (including from previous stakeholder SFX Entertainment), with Medina continuing to manage the festival's operations. Live Nation stated that it intended to "[integrate] their industry expertise" into their overall business.

In 2022, Lisbon hosted the 9th edition on several dates in June at Bela Vista Park. Rio de Janeiro hosted its edition on several dates in September.

== History ==
Year	Dates	Name	Country	City	Venue
1985	10	Rock in Rio	Brazil	Rio de Janeiro	City of Rock
1991	9	Rock in Rio II	Brazil	Rio de Janeiro	Maracanã Stadium
2001	7	Rock in Rio III	Brazil	Rio de Janeiro	City of Rock
2004	6	Rock in Rio Lisboa	Portugal	Lisbon	Bela Vista Park
2006	5	Rock in Rio Lisboa II	Portugal	Lisbon	Bela Vista Park
2008	5	Rock in Rio Lisboa III	Portugal	Lisbon	Bela Vista Park
2008	5	Rock in Rio Madrid	Spain	Madrid	La Ciudad del Rock
2010	6	Rock in Rio Lisboa IV	Portugal	Lisbon	Bela Vista Park
2010	5	Rock in Rio Madrid II	Spain	Madrid	La Ciudad del Rock
2011	7	Rock in Rio IV	Brazil	Rio de Janeiro	City of Rock
2012	5	Rock in Rio Lisboa V	Portugal	Lisbon	Bela Vista Park
2012	4	Rock in Rio Madrid III	Spain	Madrid	La Ciudad del Rock
2013	7	Rock in Rio V	Brazil	Rio de Janeiro	City of Rock
2014	5	Rock in Rio Lisboa VI	Portugal	Lisbon	Bela Vista Park
2015	7	Rock in Rio VI	Brazil	Rio de Janeiro	City of Rock
2015	4	Rock in Rio USA	United States	Las Vegas	MGM Resorts Festival Grounds
2016	6	Rock in Rio Lisboa VII	Portugal	Lisbon	Bela Vista Park
2017	7	Rock in Rio VII	Brazil	Rio de Janeiro	Barra Olympic Park
2018	4	Rock in Rio Lisboa VIII	Portugal	Lisbon	Bela Vista Park
2019	7	Rock in Rio VIII	Brazil	Rio de Janeiro	Barra Olympic Park
2022	4	Rock in Rio Lisboa IX (Note: Originally set for 2020, but was postponed one year due to the COVID-19 pandemic. It was "postponed" (sic) once again in 2021, this time to 2022, due to the same reason.)	Portugal	Lisbon	Bela Vista Park
2022	7	Rock in Rio IX (Note: Originally scheduled for 2021, postponed one year due to the COVID-19 pandemic. Thus the organization decided that all editions, be it on Rio or Lisbon, would be on even years.)	Brazil	Rio de Janeiro	Barra Olympic Park
2024	4	Rock in Rio Lisboa X	Portugal	Lisbon	Parque Tejo
2024	7	Rock in Rio X	Brazil	Rio de Janeiro	Barra Olympic Park
2026	4	Rock in Rio Lisboa XI	Portugal	Lisbon	Parque Tejo
2026	7	Rock in Rio XI	Brazil	Rio de Janeiro	Barra Olympic Park

== Rio de Janeiro ==
=== Rock in Rio (1985) ===
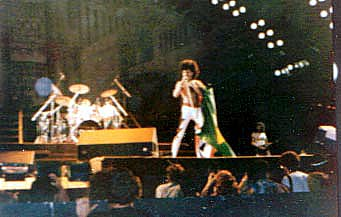
Queen performing in 1985.

The first edition of the festival was held from 11–20 January 1985. Queen, George Benson, Rod Stewart, AC/DC, and Yes were the headliners, each occupying top spot for two nights (Benson, however, ceded it to James Taylor for their second night in the same bill, due to the huge delay Taylor's extended performance had caused to his concert two days before). About 1.38 million people attended the 10-day-long festival.

==== Rock in Rio in numbers ====
- The City of Rock, which was built for the festival, covered an area of 250,000 m^{2} (around 2.7 million square feet)
- 1,600,000 litres of beverages were served, using 4 million plastic cups.
- 900,000 hamburgers.
- 500,000 pizza slices.
- McDonald's sold 58,000 hamburgers in a single day, which was a Guinness World Record until the fourth edition in 2011, where 79,000 hamburgers were sold by Bob's.

The full list of artists who performed at Rock in Rio:

- 11/01 Friday
  - Queen
  - Iron Maiden
  - Whitesnake
  - Baby Consuelo e Pepeu Gomes
  - Erasmo Carlos
  - Ney Matogrosso
- 12/01 Saturday
  - George Benson
  - James Taylor
  - Al Jarreau
  - Gilberto Gil
  - Elba Ramalho
  - Ivan Lins
- 13/01 Sunday
  - Rod Stewart
  - The Go-Go's
  - Nina Hagen
  - Blitz
  - Lulu Santos
  - Os Paralamas do Sucesso
- 14/01 Monday
  - James Taylor
  - George Benson
  - Alceu Valença
  - Moraes Moreira
- 15/01 Tuesday
  - AC/DC
  - Scorpions
  - Barão Vermelho
  - Eduardo Dusek
  - Kid Abelha e os Abóboras Selvagens
- 16/01 Wednesday
  - Rod Stewart
  - Ozzy Osbourne
  - Rita Lee
  - Moraes Moreira
  - Os Paralamas do Sucesso
- 17/01 Thursday
  - Yes
  - Al Jarreau
  - Elba Ramalho
  - Alceu Valença
- 18/01 Friday
  - Queen
  - The Go-Go's
  - The B-52's (with Chris Frantz and Tina Weymouth)
  - Lulu Santos
  - Eduardo Dusek
  - Kid Abelha e os Abóboras Selvagens
- 19/01 Saturday
  - AC/DC
  - Scorpions
  - Ozzy Osbourne
  - Whitesnake
  - Baby Consuelo e Pepeu Gomes

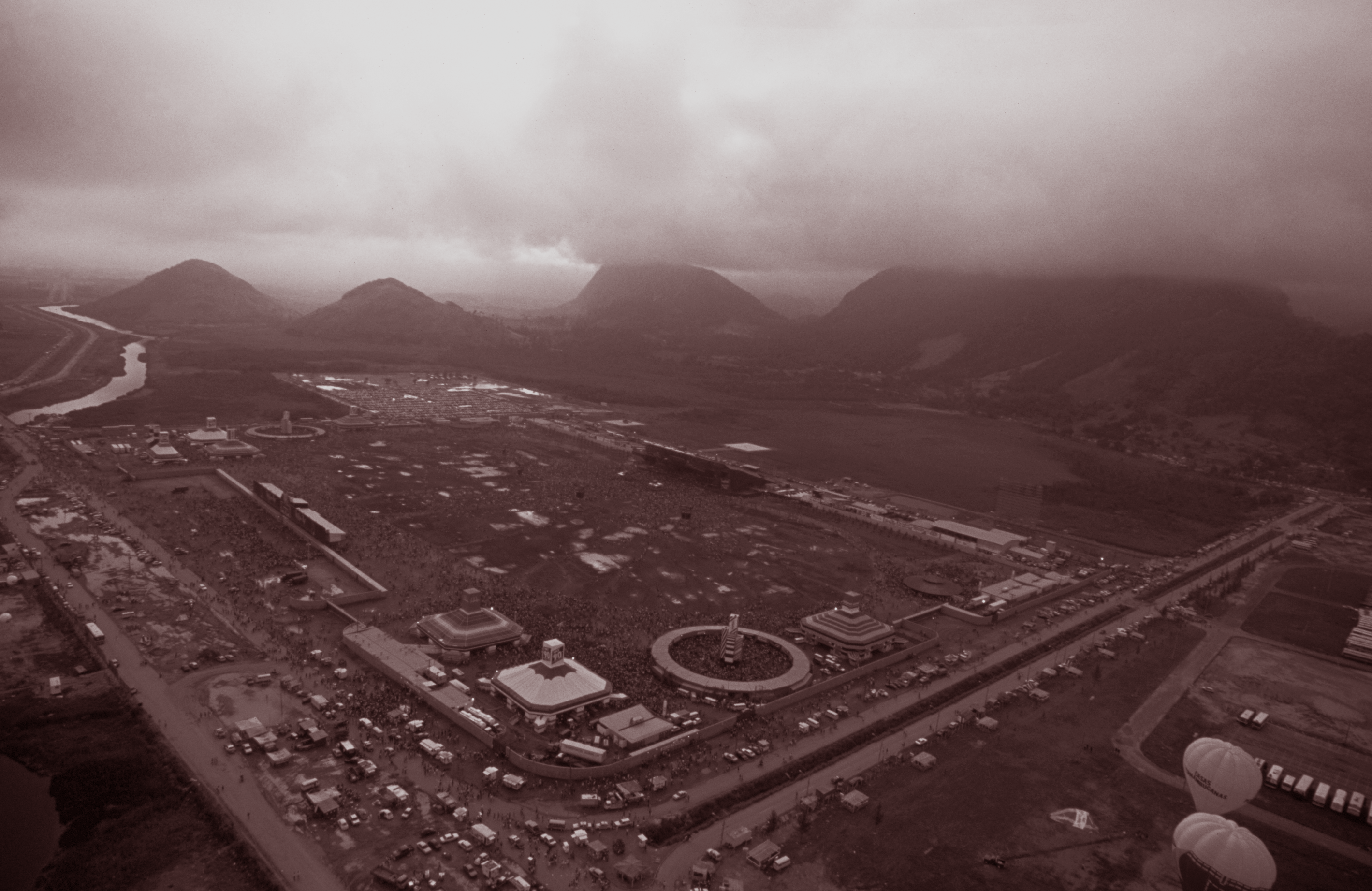
Aerial sepia image of the first Rock in Rio, Sunday 20 January 1985, Blitz on stage

- 20/01 Sunday
  - Yes
  - The B-52's (with Chris Frantz and Tina Weymouth)
  - Nina Hagen
  - Blitz
  - Gilberto Gil
  - Barão Vermelho
  - Erasmo Carlos

- Both Queen shows were filmed (early on 12 and 19 January) and broadcast throughout Brazil by Globo. Each show was watched by nearly 200 million people in over 60 countries and in front of 250,000-500,000 people for each night setting a world record for the biggest paying audience ever at the time. It was later broadcast in the United States on MTV as "Queen: Live in Rio".
- Iron Maiden was the only non-Brazilian act to play just one concert at the festival (on its opening night, headlined by Queen), due to other bookings, while every other international act performed twice. During the song "Revelations", lead singer Bruce Dickinson hit himself accidentally with a guitar and cut his eyebrow. Dickinson continued to sing in spite of heavy bleeding. They performed in front of a crowd of 500,000 people.
- The Go-Go's broke up after their two Rock in Rio performances, (headlined by Queen and Rod Stewart) though they would later reunite in the 1990s. The two Rock in Rio shows were the debut and swansong for short-tenured Go-Go's member Paula Jean Brown, who had replaced Jane Wiedlin. (Wiedlin would return to the reunited 1990s lineup.)
- Chris Frantz and Tina Weymouth, at the time Talking Heads drummer and bass player, respectively, took part at the B-52's concerts. They joined the band from the third song on and played along with them for the remainder of the performance.
- The 20 January appearance of the B-52's would turn out to be their last with guitarist Ricky Wilson, who died from AIDS in October of that year as the band was finishing their next album.
- Initially, Def Leppard was scheduled to play at the festival. However, they dropped out about two months before the event, due to delays on the recording process of the album Hysteria. Eleven days before the date Def Leppard would have played at the festival, drummer Rick Allen suffered an accident that cost him his left arm. They were replaced by Whitesnake, which happened to be the last touring date for the supporting Slide It In album tour.

=== Rock in Rio 2 (1991) ===
The second edition was held from 18–27 January 1991 at the Maracanã stadium. Headliners were Guns N' Roses, Prince and George Michael, each being top billed for two of the event's nine nights. INXS, New Kids on the Block and A-ha also had top billing, for one night each. The third night, headlined by Guns N' Roses, attracted more than 100.000 people to the stadium, the biggest audience of the nine-day event. That same day had Billy Idol, who performed the previous night, doing another set to replace Robert Plant, who could not attend due to health problems. A-ha broke the record for largest paying attendance at a concert with 198,000 fans in attendance. Full list of artists who performed at Rock in Rio 2:

- 18/01 Friday
  - Prince
  - Joe Cocker
  - Colin Hay
  - Jimmy Cliff
- 19/01 Saturday
  - INXS
  - Billy Idol
  - Carlos Santana
  - Engenheiros do Hawaii
  - Supla
  - Vid & Sangue Azul
- 20/01 Sunday
  - Guns N' Roses
  - Billy Idol
  - Faith No More
  - Titãs
  - Hanoi Hanoi
- 22/01 Tuesday
  - New Kids on the Block
  - Run-DMC
  - Roupa Nova
  - Inimigos do Rei
- 23/01 Wednesday
  - Guns N' Roses
  - Judas Priest
  - Queensrÿche
  - Megadeth
  - Lobão
  - Sepultura
- 24/01 Thursday
  - Prince
  - Carlos Santana
  - Alceu Valença
  - Laura Finocchiaro
  - Serguei
- 25/01 Friday
  - George Michael
  - Deee-Lite
  - Elba Ramalho
  - Ed Motta
- 26/01 Saturday
  - A-ha
  - Happy Mondays
  - Paulo Ricardo
  - Debbie Gibson
  - Information Society
  - Capital Inicial
  - Nenhum de Nós
- 27/01 Sunday
  - George Michael
  - Lisa Stansfield
  - Deee-Lite
  - Moraes Moreira e Pepeu Gomes
  - Léo Jaime

Guns N' Roses's 20 January concert was their first ever with then new drummer Matt Sorum and keyboard player Dizzy Reed. George Michael's second concert, on 27 January, the festival's closing day, featured his ex-Wham! partner Andrew Ridgeley, who joined Michael for a few songs at the encore.

=== Rock in Rio 3 (2001) ===
The third Rock in Rio festival took place in 2001. Its seven nights were headlined, respectively, by Sting, R.E.M., Guns N' Roses, 'N Sync, Iron Maiden, Neil Young and the Red Hot Chili Peppers.

Once O Rappa complained about their assigned time, as the contract predicted a night concert that wound up scheduled for 6:30 PM while the lesser known in the country Deftones remained in the evening, they were expelled, and five other Brazilian bands, Jota Quest, Raimundos, Charlie Brown Jr., Skank and Cidade Negra, withdrew from the festival in protest.

Iron Maiden released their set as Rock in Rio. Profits from the sale of the album were donated to the Clive Burr fund, helping their former drummer pay mounting medical bills for his multiple sclerosis.

A notable appearance at Rock in Rio 3 was that of American hard rock band Guns N' Roses, their first large show since 1993, with a new line-up featuring vocalist Axl Rose, guitarists Buckethead, Robin Finck & Paul Tobias, bassist Tommy Stinson, drummer Brain and keyboardists Dizzy Reed & Chris Pitman.

Carlinhos Brown, the opening act on the day Guns N' Roses performed, was attacked by water bottles throughout his performance. Bassist Nick Oliveri of Queens of the Stone Age performed nude for part of their set and was arrested for indecent exposure after the concert, being released soon after.

Full list of artists who performed at Rock in Rio 3:

- 12/01 Friday
  - Sting
  - Daniela Mercury
  - James Taylor
  - Milton Nascimento
  - Gilberto Gil
  - Orquestra Sinfônica Brasileira
- 13/01 Saturday
  - R.E.M.
  - Foo Fighters
  - Beck
  - Barão Vermelho
  - Fernanda Abreu
  - Cássia Eller
- 14/01 Sunday
  - Guns N' Roses
  - Oasis
  - Papa Roach
  - Ira! & Ultraje a Rigor
  - Carlinhos Brown
  - Pato Fu
- 18/01 Thursday
  - 'N Sync
  - Britney Spears
  - 5ive
  - Sandy & Junior
  - Aaron Carter
  - Moraes Moreira
- 19/01 Friday
  - Iron Maiden
  - Rob Halford
  - Sepultura
  - Queens of the Stone Age
  - Pavilhão 9
  - Sheik Tosado
- 20/01 Saturday
  - Neil Young
  - Sheryl Crow
  - Dave Matthews Band
  - Kid Abelha
  - Elba Ramalho & Zé Ramalho
  - Engenheiros do Hawaii
- 21/01 Sunday
  - Red Hot Chili Peppers
  - Silverchair
  - Capital Inicial
  - Deftones
  - O Surto
  - Diesel

=== Rock in Rio 4 (2011) ===
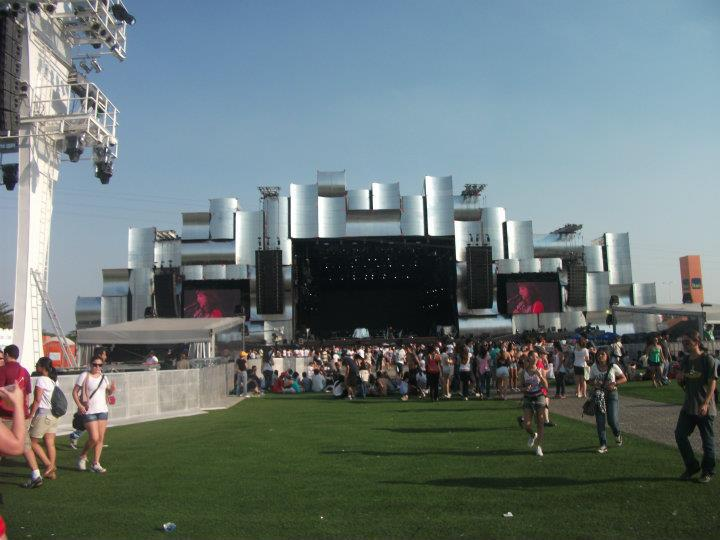
The Palco Mundo (World Stage) at the Rock in Rio 4

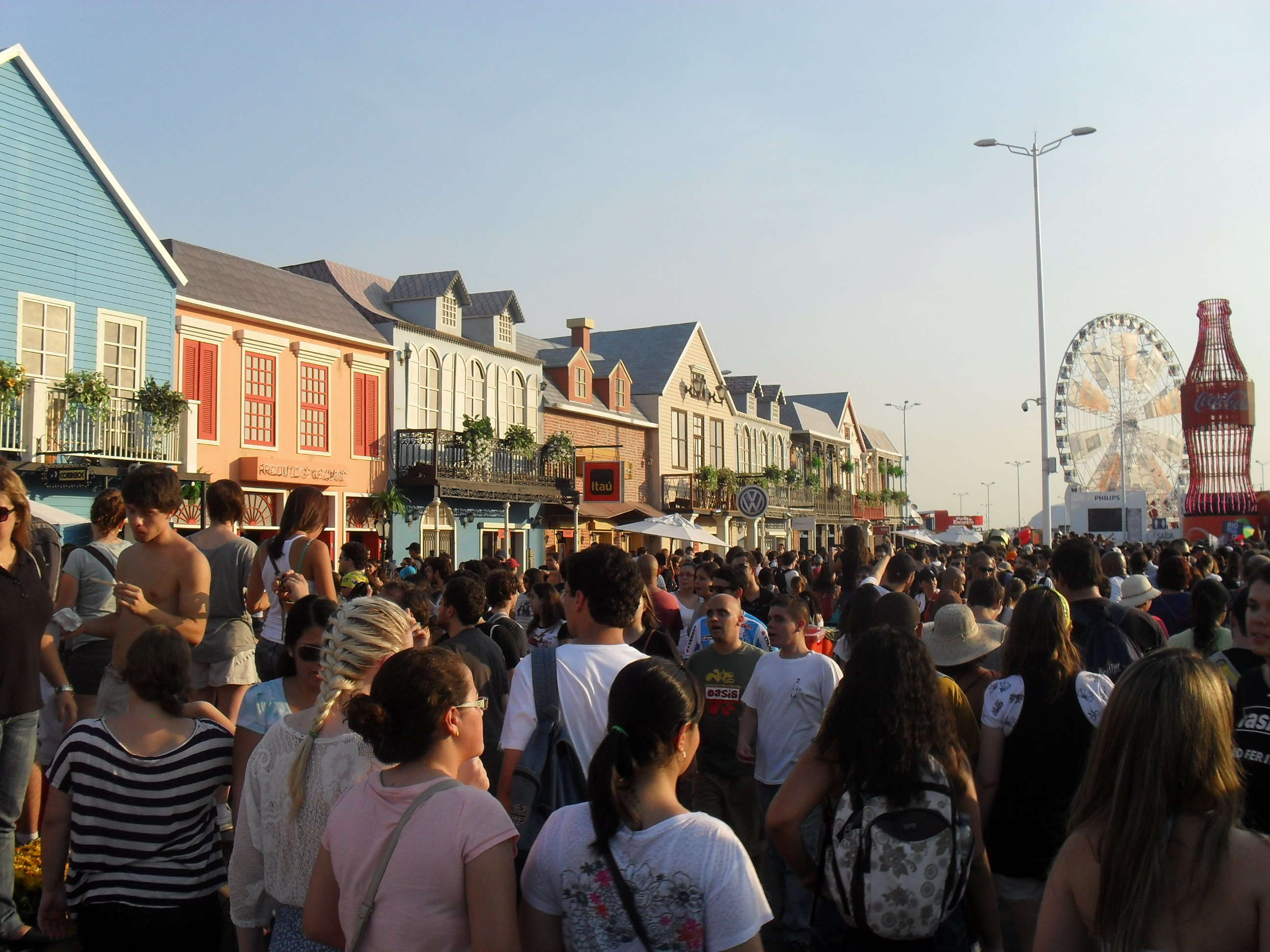
The Rock Street at the Rock in Rio 4

The fourth edition of Rock in Rio, back to its origins, was held on 23, 24, 25, 29 and 30 September, and 1 and 2 October 2011, at an area (pt) to be built next to the old City of Rock – which was the site of the Olympic Village for the 2016 Summer Olympics.

Three different stages were employed, with the headlining concerts at the Palco Mundo (World Stage), the secondary ones in Palco Sunset (Sunset Stage), and DJs playing at a specialized stage for electronic music. The closing acts, Guns N' Roses and System of a Down, entered following a poll on the festival's website. Maroon 5 was a last hour addition, following Jay-Z leaving for personal reasons.

Full list of artists who performed at Rock in Rio 4:

- 09/23 Friday
  - Palco Mundo: Rihanna, Elton John, Katy Perry, Claudia Leitte, opening concert with Os Paralamas do Sucesso, Titãs, Milton Nascimento, Maria Gadú and the Brazilian Symphony Orchestra
  - Palco Sunset: Móveis Coloniais de Acaju, Orkestra Rumpilezz, Mariana Aydar, Bebel Gilberto, Sandra de Sá, Ed Motta, Rui Veloso, Andreas Kisser, The Asteroids Galaxy Tour, The Gift
- 09/24 Saturday
  - Palco Mundo: Red Hot Chili Peppers, Snow Patrol, Capital Inicial, Stone Sour, NX Zero
  - Palco Sunset: Marcelo Yuka (pt), Cibelle, Karina Buhr, Amora Pêra (Sandra Pêra), Tulipa Ruiz, Nação Zumbi, Milton Nascimento, Esperanza Spalding, Mike Patton/Mondo Cane, Orquestra Sinfônica de Heliópolis
- 09/25 Sunday
  - Palco Mundo: Metallica, Slipknot, Motörhead, Coheed and Cambria, Gloria
  - Palco Sunset: Matanza, BNegão (pt), Korzus, The Punk Metal Allstars (East Bay Ray from Dead Kennedys, Mike Clark Suicidal Tendencies, João Gordo from Ratos de Porão and Marcel Schmier from Destruction), Angra, Sepultura, Tarja Turunen, Les Tambours du Bronx
- 09/29 Thursday
  - Palco Mundo: Stevie Wonder, Jamiroquai, Kesha, Janelle Monáe, Legião Urbana with Brazilian Symphonic Orchestra
  - Palco Sunset: Marcelo Jeneci, Curumin, Baile do Simonal, Diogo Nogueira, Afrika Bambaataa, Paula Lima, Joss Stone
- 09/30 Friday
  - Palco Mundo: Shakira, Lenny Kravitz, Ivete Sangalo, Jota Quest, Marcelo D2
  - Palco Sunset: Buraka Som Sistema, Mixhell, Céu, João Donato, Cidade Negra, Martinho da Vila, Emicida, Monobloco, Macaco, Pepeu Gomes
- 10/1 Saturday
  - Palco Mundo: Coldplay, Maroon 5, Maná, Skank, Frejat
  - Palco Sunset: Cidadão Instigado (pt), Júpiter Maçã, Tiê, Jorge Drexler, Zeca Baleiro, Erasmo Carlos, Arnaldo Antunes
- 10/2 Sunday
  - Palco Mundo: Guns N' Roses, System of a Down, Evanescence, Detonautas Roque Clube, Pitty
  - Palco Sunset: The Monomes, David Fonseca, Os Mutantes, Tom Zé, Titãs, Xutos & Pontapés, Marcelo Camelo, The Growlers
  - Eletrônica Palco: Nalaya Brown

=== Rock in Rio 5 (2013) ===
Rock in Rio 5 was held in September 2013. The headline acts, chronologically, were: Beyoncé, Muse, Justin Timberlake, Metallica, Bon Jovi, Bruce Springsteen and Iron Maiden.

- Friday 13 September
- Palco Mundo: Beyoncé, David Guetta, Ivete Sangalo, Cazuza - O Poeta Está Vivo
- Palco Sunset: Living Colour + Angélique Kidjo, Maria Rita + Selah Sue, Vintage Trouble + Jesuton, Flávio Renegado + Orelha Negra
  - Eletrônica: Otto Knows, Life Is A Loop, Ask 2 Quit, Sweet Beats
- Saturday 14 September
- Palco Mundo: Muse, Florence and the Machine, Thirty Seconds to Mars, Capital Inicial
- Palco Sunset: The Offspring, Viva A Raul Seixas – C/ Detonautas Roque Clube, Zeca Baleiro & Zélia Duncan, Marky Ramone + Michael Graves, BNegão + Autoramas
  - Eletrônica: TBA, TBA, Anderson Noise, Mau Mau, Paula Chulap
- Sunday 15 September
- Palco Mundo: Justin Timberlake, Alicia Keys, Jessie J, Jota Quest
- Palco Sunset: Ivan Lins + George Benson, Kimbra + Olodum, Nando Reis + Samuel Rosa, Aurea + The Black Samba
  - Eletrônica: DJ Harvey, dOP, Renato Ratier, Triple Crown
- Thursday 19 September
- Palco Mundo: Metallica, Alice in Chains, Ghost, Sepultura + Les Tambours du Bronx
- Palco Sunset: Rob Zombie, República + Dr. Sin + Roy Z, Sebastian Bach, Almah + Hibria
  - Eletrônica: Gesaffelstein, Brodinski, The Gaslamp Killer, DJ Ride
- Friday 20 September
- Palco Mundo: Bon Jovi, Nickelback, Matchbox Twenty, Frejat
- Palco Sunset: Ben Harper + Charlie Musselwhite, Grace Potter and the Nocturnals + Donavon Frankenreiter, Mallu Magalhães + Banda Ouro Negro, The Gift + Afroreggae
  - Eletrônica: Paul Oakenfold, Dexterz, Rodrigo Vieira, Ferris
- Saturday 21 September
- Palco Mundo: Bruce Springsteen, John Mayer, Phillip Phillips, Skank
- Palco Sunset: Gogol Bordello + Lenine, Ivo Meirelles + Fernanda Abreu + Elba Ramalho, Moraes Moreira + Pepeu Gomes + Roberta Sá, Orquestra Imperial + Lorenzo Jovanotti
  - Eletrônica: Loco Dice, DJ Vibe, Guti, Flow & Zeo
- Sunday 22 September
- Palco Mundo: Iron Maiden, Avenged Sevenfold, Slayer, Kiara Rocks
- Palco Sunset: Sepultura + Zé Ramalho, Helloween + Kai Hansen, Destruction + Krisiun, Andre Matos + Viper
  - Eletrônica: Felguk, DJ Marky, Maximum Hedrum, Boteco Electro

=== Rock in Rio 6 (2015) ===
The sixth Brazilian edition was held from 18 to 27 September 2015 at the City of Rock. The headliners were Queen + Adam Lambert, Metallica, Rod Stewart, Elton John, System of a Down, Slipknot, Rihanna and Katy Perry.

- Friday 18 September
  - Palco Mundo: Queen + Adam Lambert, OneRepublic, The Script, Rock in Rio 30 Anos
  - Palco Sunset: Tribute to Cássia Eller, Lenine + Nação Zumbi + Martin Fondse, Ira! + Rappin' Hood and Tony Tornado, Dônica + Arthur Verocai
  - Eletrônica: DJ Meme, Kerri Chandler, Barbara Tucker, Tribute to Lincoln Olivetti, Tribute to Raul Seixas
- Saturday 19 September
  - Palco Mundo: Metallica, Mötley Crüe, Royal Blood, Gojira
  - Palco Sunset: Korn, Ministry + Burton C. Bell, Angra + Dee Snider + Doro Pesch, Noturnall + Michael Kiske
  - Eletrônica: Crookers, Headhunterz, Tropkillaz, A Liga, Chemical Surf
- Sunday 20 September
  - Palco Mundo: Rod Stewart, Elton John, Seal, Os Paralamas do Sucesso
  - Palco Sunset: John Legend, Magic!, Baby do Brasil, Alice Caymmi + Eumir Deodato
  - Eletrônica: Matador, Pig and Dan, Gui Boratto, Flow & Zeo ft. Karina Zeviani, Elekfantz
- Thursday 24 September
  - Palco Mundo: System of a Down, Queens of the Stone Age, Hollywood Vampires, CPM 22
  - Palco Sunset: Deftones, Lamb of God, Halestorm, Project46 + John Wayne
  - Eletrônica: Vintage Culture, Anderson Noise + Mau Mau + Renato Cohen, 2 Attack (Paula Chalup + Mau Mau)
- Friday 25 September
  - Palco Mundo: Slipknot, Faith No More, Mastodon, De La Tierra
  - Palco Sunset: Steve Vai + Camerata Florianópolis, Nightwish + Tony Kakko, Moonspell + Derrick Green, Clássicos do Terror
  - Eletrônica: Alok, Felguk, Marcelo Cic, Volkoder, Hnqo
- Saturday 26 September
  - Palco Mundo: Rihanna, Sam Smith, Sheppard, Lulu Santos
  - Palco Sunset: Sérgio Mendes + Carlinhos Brown, Angélique Kidjo, Erasmo Carlos + Ultraje a Rigor, Brothers of Brazil
  - Eletrônica: Matthias Tanzmann + Davide Squillace, DJ Vibe + Rui Vargas, Leo Janeiro + Leozinho, Conti + Mandi
- Sunday 27 September
  - Palco Mundo: Katy Perry, A-ha, AlunaGeorge, Cidade Negra
  - Palco Sunset: Rio 450 Anos, Al Jarreau, Aurea + Boss AC, Suricato + Raul Midón
  - Eletrônica: Life is a Loop, Diego Miranda + Rodrigo Shà, Ely Yabu, Amanda Chang

=== Rock in Rio 7 (2017) ===
The seventh Brazilian edition was held in the Barra Olympic Park, which has since become the regular City of Rock, from 15 to 24 September 2017. The headliners were Maroon 5, Justin Timberlake, Aerosmith, Bon Jovi, Guns N' Roses, The Who, and Red Hot Chili Peppers. Singer Lady Gaga was scheduled to perform on 15 September, but had to cancel 24 hours before, leading Maroon 5 to perform a second concert due to her absence. The Pretty Reckless also cancelled their concert in the secondary stage, replaced by Tyler Bryant & The Shakedown.

World Stage
15 September (Friday)	16 September (Saturday)	17 September (Sunday)	21 September (Thursday)
Maroon 5; 00:25; 5 Seconds of Summer; 22:35; Pet Shop Boys; 21:05; Ivete Sangalo; 19:00	Maroon 5; 00:25; Fergie; 22:35; Shawn Mendes; 21:12; Skank; 19:00	Justin Timberlake; 00:25; Alicia Keys; 22:35; Walk the Moon; 21:05; Frejat; 19:00	Aerosmith; 00:25; Def Leppard; 22:35; Fall Out Boy; 21:03; Scalene; 19:00
22 September (Friday)	23 September (Saturday)	24 September (Sunday)	
Bon Jovi; 00:25; Tears for Fears; 22:35; Alter Bridge; 21:00; Jota Quest; 19:00	Guns N' Roses; 00:25; The Who; 22:35; Incubus; 21:05; Titãs; 18:58	Red Hot Chili Peppers; 00:25; Thirty Seconds to Mars; 22:35; The Offspring; 21:07; Capital Inicial; 19:00	

=== Rock in Rio 8 (2019) ===
The eight Brazilian edition was held from 27 September to 6 October 2019. It marked the first performance of singer Pink in Latin America

World Stage
27 September (Friday)	28 September (Saturday)	29 September (Sunday)	3 October (Thursday)	4 October (Friday)	5 October (Saturday)	6 October (Sunday)
Drake; Ellie Goulding; Bebe Rexha; Alok	Foo Fighters; Weezer; Tenacious D CPM 22 + Raimundos Whitesnake	Bon Jovi; Dave Matthews Band; Goo Goo Dolls; Ivete Sangalo	Red Hot Chili Peppers; Panic! at the Disco; Nile Rodgers & Chic; Capital Inicial	Iron Maiden; Scorpions; Helloween; Sepultura	P!nk; The Black Eyed Peas; H.E.R. Anitta	Muse; Imagine Dragons; Nickelback; Os Paralamas do Sucesso

=== Rock in Rio 9 (2022) ===
The ninth edition of Rock in Rio in Brazil took place between 2–11 September 2022.

World Stage
2 September (Friday)	3 September (Saturday)	4 September (Sunday)	8 September (Thursday)	9 September (Friday)	10 September (Saturday)	11 September (Sunday)
Iron Maiden; Dream Theater; Gojira; Sepultura + Brazilian Symphony Orchestra	Post Malone; Marshmello; Jason Derulo; Alok	Justin Bieber; Demi Lovato; Iza; Jota Quest	Guns N' Roses; Måneskin; The Offspring; CPM 22	Green Day; Fall Out Boy; Billy Idol; Capital Inicial	Coldplay; Camila Cabello; Bastille; Djavan	Dua Lipa; Megan Thee Stallion; Rita Ora; Ivete Sangalo

=== Rock in Rio 10 (2024) ===
The tenth edition of Rock in Rio in Brazil took place between 13–22 September 2024. It was the first Rock in Rio to dedicate an entire day of its line up to Brazilian artists only, with musical spectacles called "Forever...", featuring multiple artists from different genres.

World Stage
13 September (Friday)	14 September (Saturday)	15 September (Sunday)	19 September (Thursday)	20 September (Friday)	21 September (Saturday)	22 September (Sunday)
Travis Scott; 21 Savage; Ludmilla; Matuê feat. Wiu & Teto	Imagine Dragons; OneRepublic; Zara Larsson; Lulu Santos	Avenged Sevenfold; Evanescence; Journey; Os Paralamas do Sucesso	Ed Sheeran; Charlie Puth; Joss Stone; Jão	Katy Perry; Karol G Cyndi Lauper; Ivete Sangalo	Forever Rock; Forever Sertanejo; Forever MPB; Forever Trap	Shawn Mendes; Akon; Ne-Yo; Luísa Sonza

=== Rock in Rio 11 (2026) ===
World Stage
4 September (Friday)	5 September (Saturday)	6 September (Sunday)	7 September (Monday)	11 September (Friday)	12 September (Saturday)	13 September (Sunday)
Foo Fighters	Avenged Sevenfold	Calvin Harris	Elton John	Stray Kids	Maroon 5	Twenty One Pilots
Rise Against	Bring Me The Horizon	Black Eyed Peas	Gilberto Gil	Alok	Demi Lovato	Halsey
The Hives	Machine Gun Kelly	Nelly	Jon Batiste	Hwasa	J Balvin	Lola Young
Nova Twins	Sepultura	Barão Vermelho	Luísa Sonza invites Roberto Menescal	Nexz	Pedro Sampaio	Ivete Sangalo

== Lisbon, Portugal, and Madrid, Spain ==
=== Rock in Rio Lisboa (2004) ===
After the huge success of Rock in Rio 3 in Brazil, Roberta Medina decided to organize a festival of the same stature in Lisbon. The decision to maintain the name Rock in Rio was controversial, and detractors of the idea in Brazil started calling it Rock in Rio Tejo, after the Tagus river (rio Tejo, in Portuguese) which runs through the Portuguese capital.

The first edition of Rock in Rio Lisboa, as the festival was officially called, took place in 2004. Although the festival had a slight change of name, it kept the same structure as the Brazilian editions. An entire City of Rock, with an area of over 260,000 audience was erected at the Bela Vista park, with a large centre stage and several tents where different artists would perform, simultaneously. Guns N' Roses were scheduled to perform at the festival, but had to cancel after guitarist Buckethead left in March.

Full list of artists who performed at Rock in Rio Lisboa:

- 28/05
  - Paul McCartney
- 29/05
  - Peter Gabriel
  - Ben Harper
  - Jet
  - Gilberto Gil
  - Rui Veloso
  - Nuno Norte
- 30/05
  - Foo Fighters
  - Evanescence
  - Seether
  - Kings of Leon
  - Charlie Brown Jr.
  - Xutos & Pontapés
- 4/06
  - Metallica
  - Incubus
  - Slipknot
  - Sepultura
  - Moonspell
- 5/06
  - Britney Spears
  - Black Eyed Peas
  - Daniela Mercury
  - Sugababes
  - João Pedro Pais
  - Nuno Norte
- 6/6
  - Sting
  - Alicia Keys
  - Pedro Abrunhosa
  - Alejandro Sanz
  - Ivete Sangalo
  - Luís Represas

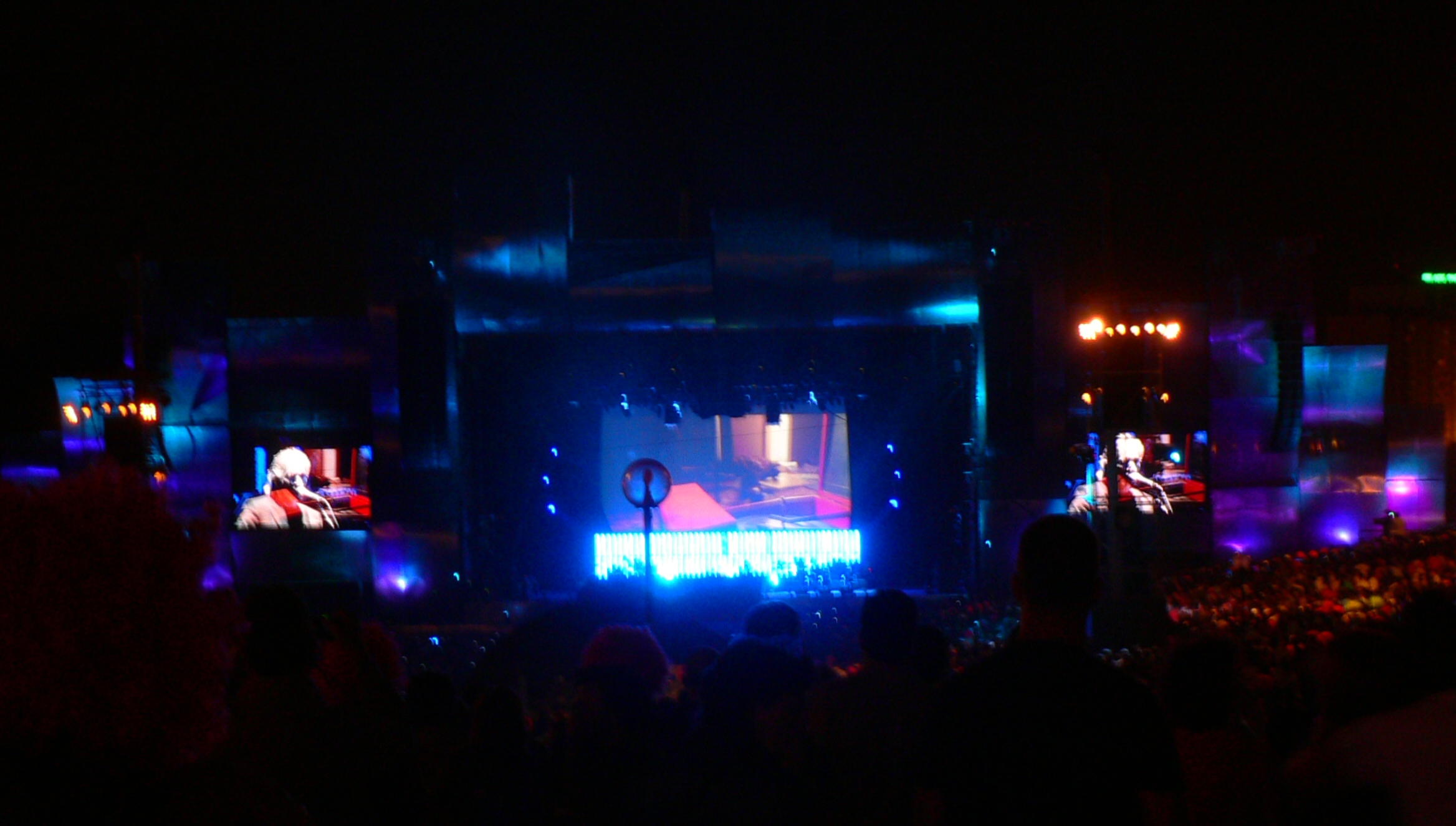
Roger Waters in Rock in Rio Lisbon

=== Rock in Rio Lisboa 2 (2006) ===
The second edition of Rock in Rio Lisboa was held in 2006, on 26/27 May and 2/3/4 June.

- 05/27 Friday
  - Shakira
  - Jamiroquai
  - Ivete Sangalo
  - D'ZRT
- 05/28 Saturday
  - Guns N' Roses
  - The Darkness
  - Xutos e Pontapés
  - Pitty
- 06/02 Friday
  - Roger Waters
  - Santana
  - Rui Veloso
  - Jota Quest
- 06/03 Saturday
  - Red Hot Chili Peppers
  - Da Weasel
  - Kasabian
  - Orishas
- 06/04 Sunday
  - Sting
  - Anastacia
  - Corinne Bailey Rae
  - Marcelo D2

=== Rock in Rio Lisboa & Madrid (2008) ===
The third edition of Rock in Rio took place in Lisbon, Portugal, on 30 May 31 and 1 June and 5–6. The dates for Arganda del Rey, Madrid, were 27-28 June and 4–6 July.

==== Rock in Rio Lisboa 3 ====
30 May

- Paulo Gonzo
- Ivete Sangalo
- Amy Winehouse
- Lenny Kravitz (and Daniel R.)

31 May

- Skank
- Alanis Morissette
- Alejandro Sanz
- Bon Jovi

1 June

- Docemania
- Just Girls
- 4 Taste
- Xutos & Pontapés
- Tokio Hotel
- Joss Stone
- Rod Stewart

5 June

- Metallica
- Machine Head
- Apocalyptica
- Moonspell

6 June

- Linkin Park
- The Offspring
- Muse
- Kaiser Chiefs
- Orishas

==== Rock in Rio Madrid ====
27 June

- Alanis Morissette
- Jack Johnson
- Manolo García
- Neil Young

28 June

- Mando Diao
- El Canto Del Loco
- Tokio Hotel
- Carlinhos Brown

4 July

- Shakira
- Jamiroquai
- Amy Winehouse
- Stereophonics

5 July

- The Police
- Alejandro Sanz
- Estopa
- Ivete Sangalo

6 July

- Lenny Kravitz
- Franz Ferdinand
- Chris Cornell
- Tiësto

=== Rock in Rio Lisboa & Madrid (2010) ===
==== Rock in Rio Lisboa 4 ====
21 May / 82.000

- Shakira
- John Mayer
- Ivete Sangalo
- Mariza

22 May / 45.000

- Elton John
- Trovante
- Leona Lewis
- 2 MANY DJS LIVE
- João Pedro Pais

27 May / 85.000

- Muse
- Snow Patrol
- Xutos & Pontapés
- Fonzie (replaced Sum 41)
- Sum 41 (canceled)

29 May / 88.000

- Miley Cyrus
- McFly
- D'ZRT
- Amy Macdonald

30 May / 38.000

- Rammstein
- Motörhead
- Megadeth
- Soulfly

==== Rock in Rio Madrid 2 ====
4 June / 51.000

- Bon Jovi
- Paul van Dyk
- Mägo de Oz (replaced John Mayer)
- John Mayer (canceled)

5 June / 90.000

- Shakira
- Rihanna
- Calle 13
- David Guetta

6 June / 40.000

- Miley Cyrus
- McFly
- Amy Macdonald

11 June / 30.000

- Rage Against the Machine
- Jane's Addiction
- Cypress Hill
- Tiësto

14 June / 48.000

- Metallica
- Motörhead
- Sôber
- Marillion

=== Rock in Rio Lisboa & Madrid (2012) ===
==== Rock in Rio Lisboa 5 ====
- 5/25 Friday
  - Palco Mundo: Metallica, Evanescence, Mastodon, Sepultura, Tambours Du Bronx
  - Palco Sunset: Kreator + Andreas Kisser, Mão Morta + Pedro Laginha, Ramp + Teratron
  - Eletrónica Heineken: Chase and Status, DJ Set & Rage, Dr Lectroluv, Life is a Loop, Leo Janeiro, Tha lovely Bastards (Mad Mac and Nuno Lopes), Bis Boys Please, MC Johnny Def
  - Rock Street:
- 5/26 Saturday
  - Palco Mundo: Linkin Park, Smashing Pumpkins, The Offspring, Limp Bizkit
  - Palco Sunset: Xutos & Titãs, Mafalda Veiga & Marcelo Jeneci, Rita Redshoes & Moreno Veloso
  - Eletrónica Heineken: Azari & III, The Magician, Punks Jump Up, The Discotexas Band, Pedro Quintão, Mirror People (Rui Maia/X Wife), MC Johnny Def
  - Rock Street:
- 6/1 Friday
  - Palco Mundo: Lenny Kravitz, Maroon 5, Ivete Sangalo, Expensive Soul
  - Palco Sunset: Boss Ac & Zé Ricardo + Paula Lima, Orelha Negra + Hyldon + Kassin, Black Mamba & Tiago Bettencourt
  - Eletrónica Heineken: Jamie Jones, Maceo Plex, Dyed Soundorom, Kings of Swingers (Renato Rathier + Mau Mau), Magazino, José Belo + Zé Salvador, MC Johnny Def
  - Rock Street:
- 6/2 Saturday
  - Palco Mundo: Stevie Wonder, Bryan Adams, Joss Stone, The Gift
  - Palco Sunset: Luis Represas & Joao Gil & Jorge Palma, Amor Electro & Moska, Ana Free + The Monomes
  - Eletrónica Heineken: Masters at Work (Louie Vega + Kenny Dope Gonzales), The Martinez Brothers, JohnWaynes Live DJ, Miguel Rendeiro, DJ Poppy, MC Johnny Def
  - Rock Street:
- 6/3 Sunday
  - Palco Mundo: Bruce Springsteen & The E Street Band, Xutos & Pontapés, James, Kaiser Chiefs
  - Palco Sunset: Rui Veloso + Erasmo Carlos, David Fonseca + Convidado, Carminho + Convidado
  - Eletrónica Heineken: DJ Harvey, DJ Vibe, Dop Live, DJ Dixon, Stereo Addiction, Mc Johnny Def
  - Rock Street:

==== Rock in Rio Madrid 3 ====
- 6/30 Saturday
  - Maná, Lenny Kravitz, Luciano, Macaco
- 7/5 Thursday
  - Rihanna (canceled), Swedish House Mafia, Calvin Harris
- 7/6 Friday — "Noche Electrónica"
  - David Guetta, Pitbull, Erick Morillo, Pete Tong, Afrojack, Wally Lopez, Martin Solveig
- 7/7 Saturday
  - Red Hot Chili Peppers, Incubus, Gogol Bordello, Deadmau5

=== Rock in Rio Lisboa 6 (2014) ===
World Stage
25 May (Sunday)	29 May (Thursday)	30 May (Friday)	31 May (Saturday)	1 June (Sunday)
Ivete Sangalo; 00:00; Robbie Williams; 22:00; Paloma Faith; 20:30; Boss AC & Aurea; 19:00	The Rolling Stones; 23:45; Gary Clark, Jr. 22:00; Xutos & Pontapés; 20:30; Rui Veloso with Lenine & Angélique Kidjo; 19:00	Steve Aoki; 00:30; Linkin Park; 22:30; Queens of the Stone Age; 20:45; Capital Inicial; 19:00	Arcade Fire; 23:55; Lorde; 22:00; Ed Sheeran; 20:30 tribute to António Variações; 19:00	Justin Timberlake; 23:45; Jessie J 22:00; Mac Miller; 20:15; João Pedro Pais & Jorge Palma; 18:45; Kika; 17:30

=== Rock in Rio Lisboa 7 (2016) ===
World Stage
19 May (Thursday)	20 May (Friday)	27 May (Friday)	28 May (Saturday)	29 May (Sunday)
Bruce Springsteen; 23:45; Xutos & Pontapés; 22:00; Stereophonics; 20:30; Rock in Rio - the Musical; 19:00	Queen + Adam Lambert; 23:45; Mika; 22:00; Fergie; 20:30; Rock in Rio - The Musical; 19:00	Hollywood Vampires; 23:45; Korn; 22:00; Rival Sons; 20:30; Rock in Rio - The Musical; 19:00	Maroon 5; 23:45; Ivete Sangalo; 22:00; D.A.M.A & Gabriel, o Pensador; 20:30; Rock in Rio the Musical; 19:00	Avicii; 22:45; Ivete Sangalo (replaced Ariana Grande); 21:00; Ariana Grande (cancelled); 21:00; Charlie Puth; 19:30; Rock in Rio - O Musical; 18:00

=== Rock in Rio Lisboa 8 (2018) ===
World Stage
23 June (Saturday)	24 June (Sunday)	29 June (Friday)	30 June (Saturday)
Muse; Bastille; Haim; Diogo Piçarra	Bruno Mars; Demi Lovato; Anitta; Agir	The Killers; The Chemical Brothers; Xutos & Pontapés; James	Katy Perry; Jessie J Ivete Sangalo; Hailee Steinfeld

24 June sold out almost three months prior to the festival.

=== Rock in Rio Lisboa 9 (2022) ===
The festival was originally set to take place in June 2020, but was postponed to 2021 and again to 2022 due to the COVID-19 pandemic.

World Stage
18 June (Saturday)	19 June (Sunday)	25 June (Saturday)	26 June (Sunday)
Muse	Black Eyed Peas	Duran Duran	Post Malone
The National	Ellie Goulding	A-HA	Anitta
Liam Gallagher	Ivete Sangalo	UB40 Ali Campbell	Jason Derulo
Xutos & Pontapés	David Carreira	Bush	HMB

=== Rock in Rio Lisboa 10 (2024) ===
World Stage
15 June (Saturday)	16 June (Sunday)	22 June (Saturday)	23 June (Sunday)
Scorpions	Ed Sheeran	Jonas Brothers	Doja Cat
Evanescence	Calum Scott	Macklemore	Camila Cabello
Extreme	Jão	Ivete Sangalo	Ne-Yo
Xutos & Pontapés	Fernando Daniel	Carolina Deslandes	Aitana

=== Rock in Rio Lisboa 11 (2026) ===
World Stage
20 June (Saturday)	21 June (Sunday)	27 June (Saturday)	28 June (Sunday)
Katy Perry	Linkin Park	Rod Stewart	21 Savage
Charlie Puth	Cypress Hill	Cyndi Lauper	Central Cee
Pedro Sampaio	The Pretty Reckless	Shaggy	Rema
Calema	Grandson	4 Non Blondes	Matuê

== Las Vegas ==
=== Rock in Rio USA (2015) ===
"Rock in Rio USA" was the first North American edition of the festival, being held in Las Vegas on 8, 9, 15 and 16 May 2015. The festival took place on two weekends, oriented towards rock and pop music. Rock Weekend took place on 8 and 9 May, and Pop Weekend took place on 15 and 16 May. It took place in the City of Rock (Las Vegas), located north of the Las Vegas Strip.

- Friday 8 May
  - Main Stage: No Doubt, Maná, The Pretty Reckless, Smallpools, Cirque du Soleil
  - Mercedes-Benz Evolution Stage: Foster the People, Gary Clark, Jr., Theophilus London, Saints of Valory
  - EDM Stage: AN21, Ftampa, Wax Motif, MVTH
- Saturday 9 May
  - Main Stage: Metallica, Linkin Park, Rise Against, Hollywood Undead
  - Mercedes-Benz Evolution Stage: Deftones, Sepultura featuring Steve Vai, Coheed & Cambria, Of Mice & Men
  - EDM Stage: Alok, Caked Up, The Gaslamp Killer, Felguk
- Friday 15 May
  - Main Stage: Taylor Swift, Ed Sheeran, Echosmith, Ivete Sangalo
  - Mercedes-Benz Evolution Stage: Jessie J, Charli XCX, Tove Lo, James Bay
  - EDM Stage: Heidi Lawden, Valida, Jeniluv, Whitney Fierce
- Saturday 16 May
  - Main Stage:Bruno Mars, John Legend, Empire of the Sun, Big Sean
  - Mercedes-Benz Evolution Stage: Joss Stone, Magic!, Mayer Hawthorne, Mikky Ekko
  - EDM Stage: DJ Vibe, Lovefingers, Renato Ratier, Behrouz

== Live broadcasts ==
The TV Globo Networks broadcast selected Rock in Rio concerts in Brazil, with cable affiliate Multishow broadcasting live concerts. In Nigeria, TNT and A&E broadcasts the festival live.

In Portugal, Rock in Rio Lisboa is broadcast by SIC Radical.

In 2019, the festival was broadcast in the U.S. by LiveXLive.

== See also ==
- List of historic rock festivals
