= Pepeu Gomes =

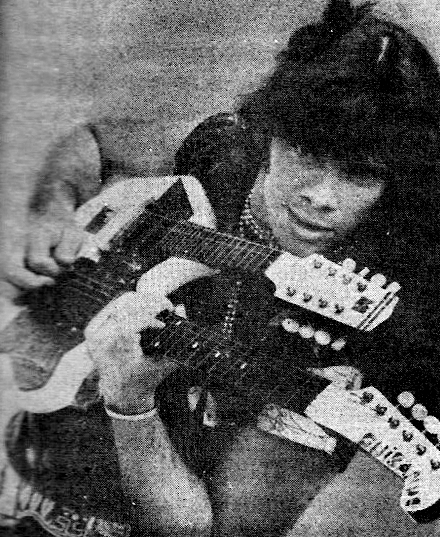
- Pepeu Gomes in 1980

Background information
- Born: Pedro Anibal de Oliveira Gomes; February 7, 1952 (age 74)
- Origin: Salvador, Bahia, Brazil
- Genres: Brazilian rock, psychedelic rock, samba rock, MPB
- Occupations: Singer, songwriter, guitarist
- Instruments: Vocals, electric guitar, acoustic guitar, craviola, bahian guitar, mandolin
- Years active: 1963–present

Pedro Anibal de Oliveira Gomes, better known as Pepeu Gomes (born February 7, 1952, in Salvador, Bahia state) is an accomplished Brazilian guitar player, multi-instrumentalist and composer. He was one of the members of Novos Baianos. Pepeu has already been considered by the magazine Guitar World in 1988 as one of the ten best guitarists in the world in the category world music.

== Biography ==
Pepeu Gomes was born February 7, 1952, and had contact with music from an early age because his father played in a dance orchestra and his mother taught piano lessons. Growing up he was influenced by the music of Waldir Azevedo, Jacob do Bandolim, Pixinguinha, and Canhoto da Paraíba. At nine years of age he invented his first instrument, a broom with a cable (that was usually used for street fighting) with the string tied at the ends. Later, he obtained a classical guitar and he learned to play by ear. At 11 years old, Gomes, interested in the style of Jovem Guarda, formed his first band, "Los Gatos" ("The Cats"), in which he played the upright bass. He formed his first professional band at 17 years old named "Os Minos". The group disbanded due to the difficulty of having members that were all minors in age. Gomes became a member of the band Leif's, where he played guitar and appeared on local television programs. While playing in Leif's, Gilberto Gil watched on TV the appearances and invited Gomes to partake in the concert marking his exile from Brazil which was also held with Caetano Veloso in Salvador (Gil and Veloso would seek political refuge in London). Before leaving, Gil gave Gomes the album Smash Hits by Jimi Hendrix who Gomes had not yet heard of. Hendrix would be the most influential artist on Gomes over the course of his career. In the 1970s Gomes formed the band Novos Baianos with Moraes Moreira, Paulinho Boca de Cantor, Luiz Galvão, and Baby Consuelo where he played guitar, wrote and arranged songs with Moreira.

After recording the first album of Novos Baianos, Gomes deeply studied the rhythms of many kinds of Brazilian music including samba, frevo, choro, and maracatu; he also learned to play bandolim. In 1971 alongside his work in the Novos Baianos, Gomes substituted for Lanny Gordin on the "Fa-Tal" tour by Gal Costa, which resulted in the release of a double album of the same name where Gomes plays on most of the tracks. Gomes began his solo career in 1978 recording his first solo album Geração do Som. During this phase, he played with Gilberto Gil in the Montreux Jazz Festival in Switzerland which was recorded on the album Gil ao Vivo em Montreux. In 1979, Gomez released his second album, Na Terra a Mais de Mil, marking his debut as a singer. The album sold many copies and contained the hit, "Meu Coração". In 1980, he followed his praised performance from 1978 and returned to the Montreux Jazz Festival for an individual performance. This performance was recorded and released as an album under the name, Pepeu Gomes Ao Vivo. In the same year he released the song "O Mal É o Que Sai da Boca do Homem" which also featured Baby Consuelo and Galvão. This song generated substantial controversy due to the verse "Você pode fumar baseado". Gomes released his album titled, Pepeu Gomes, in 1981 which earned him his first gold album, and praise for his execution of the track, "Eu também quero beijar". He followed this album with Um Raio Laser in 1982. He began recording in the United States with his 1982 album Masculino e Feminino. Recording in the U.S. introduced him to the composer Ronnie Foster and musicians such as Paulinho da Costa, Jerry Hey, Garry Grant, Airto Moreira, and John Robinson. In 1985, Gomes released the album Energia Positiva and was invited to participate in Rock in Rio. Even though he was met with a hostile reception from the public towards Brazilian artists, Gomes was applauded and succeeded in winning them over. Gomes considers Rock in Rio to be one of the best moments of his career and after the show he was praised by John Sykes, the guitarist of Whitesnake.

In the late 1980s, he returned to instrumental music dedicating himself to his guitar playing, covering old hits such as the chorinhos "Brasileirinho" (Waldir Azevedo) and "Noites Cariocas" (Jacob do Bandolim), artists who were present at the beginning of his career and helped him become famous as a virtuoso. He also participated in jazz festivals throughout the world and releasing the album Instrumental on the Road in 1989, with the Third World Talent Agency in New York. Gomes was invited to become a member of the heavy metal band Megadeth and later towards the end of the 1990s to become a member of Living Colour. He refused both invitations for personal reasons. Gomes later admitted in an interview hosted by MTV in 2011 that he turned down the invitation because he would be a hired musician and that he would only leave Brazil to be a member of a permanent band and not as an employee. In the 1990s he re-encountered his old partner Moraes Moreira and they released two albums, Moraes e Pepeu and Moraes e Pepeu ao vivo no Japão, the last was a result of a tour that had it last show on Rock in Rio ll. In 1993 Gomes released a new album which obtained a deal of success, driven by the song "Sexy Yemanjá" which was the sound track of the soap opera Mulheres de Areia on TV Globo. During the 1990s he continued to tour, playing again on the Montreux Festival and performing many shows with the guitarist Armandinho. In 1998 Gomes released a compilation of all the instrumental music of his career, called 20 anos: Discografia Instrumental, and in the following year he released a CD of acoustic cover of his greatest hits, titled Meu coração. This album was produced with the guitarist Robertinho de Recife and included two unpublished tracks: "O que é que você quer comigo?" and "Dono de mim". In 2004 to commemorate the 25th anniversary of his solo career he released a CD and DVD called De espírito em paz – Ao Vivo. In 2011, Gomes re-released a part of his remastered discography on the CD On the Road, that received some extra tracks and he approved the release of an unpublished album, titled Eu Não Procuro o Som, recorded live in 1979. After this, Gomes was preparing to release one more album.

== Discography ==
=== Solo career ===
- 1978 – Geração do som (CBS)
- 1979 – Na terra a mais de mil (Elektra/WEA)
- 1980 – Ao vivo em Montreux (Elektra/WEA)
- 1981 – Pepeu Gomes (WEA)
- 1982 – Um raio laser (WEA)
- 1983 – Masculino e feminino (CBS)
- 1985 – Energia positiva (CBS)
- 1988 – Pepeu Gomes (WEA)
- 1989 – On the Road (WEA)
- 1990 – Moraes e Pepeu (WEA)
- 1990 – Moraes e Pepeu – Ao Vivo no Japão (WEA)
- 1993 – Pepeu Gomes (Warner Music)
- 1998 – Pepeu Gomes – 20 anos discografia instrumental (Natasha)
- 1999 – Meu coração (Trama)
- 2004 – De Espirito em Paz – Ao Vivo (Som Livre)

=== With Novos Baianos ===
- 1970 – É Ferro na Boneca (RGE)
- 1972 – Acabou Chorare (Som Livre)
- 1973 – Novos Baianos F.C. (Continental)
- 1974 – Novos Baianos (Continental)
- 1974 – Vamos pro Mundo (Som Livre)
- 1976 – Caia na Estrada e Perigas Ver (Tapecar)
- 1977 – Praga de Baiano (Tapecar)
- 1978 – Farol da Barra (CBS)
- 1997 – Infinito Circular (Globo/Polydor)

=== With Leif´s ===
- 1970 – Fobus in Totum / Nem Sei De Mim (PSICOBR{Compacto Simples Reedição 2014})
