= Paulinho Boca de Cantor =

Paulo Roberto Figueiredo de Oliveira
- Born: June 28, 1946 (age 80)
- Occupations: Composer; singer

Paulo Roberto Figueiredo de Oliveira, better known as Paulinho Boca de Cantor (born June 28, 1946, Santa Inês, Bahia, Brazil), is a Brazilian singer and composer. He was a founding member of the band Novos Baianos, and performed with them from 1969 to 1979.

== Career ==
=== Novos Baianos ===
Boca de Cantor began as the lead singer of the group Orquesta Avanço that formed in Salvador, Bahia, Brazil in the interior of Bahia. In 1969 he founded the band, Novos Baianos, alongside Pepeu Gomes, Baby Consuelo, Luiz Galvão, and Moraes Moreira. He was one of the principal composers of the group along with Luiz Galvão. As a member of Novos Baianos, he released 10 studio albums, including Acabou Chorare, which has been considered to be the best Brazilian album of all time. In 1976 he released the Trio Elétrico dos Novos Baianos. This marked the first time vocals had been included in an electric trio and influenced the format of the genre since vocals became a staple thereafter. He began his solo career in 1979 with the disbanding of Novos Baianos.

=== Solo career ===
He released his first solo album, Paulinho Boca de Cantor - Bom de Chinfra e Bom de Amor, in 1979 and featured collaboration with Gilberto Gil and Luiz Galvão on the track “Que bom prato é vatapá”. 1981 marked one of the high points of his solo career with the release of Valeu, one of the best selling independent albums in Brazilian history. In 1983, he played in Rome in the show Bahia de Todos os Sambas, alongside Gal Costa, Caetano Veloso, and João Gilberto. In the following years he signed a contract with EMI and recorded three albums.

He founded Associação Bahiana de Artistas Independentes (Bahian Association of Independent Artists, ABAI). In 1997 he reunited with Novos Baianos and released the disc Infinito Circular on the label Som Livre. The same year also featured live shows with the band including, "Noite Brasileira" in the Montreux Jazz Festival in Montreux, Switzerland. In 2000, he became a researcher of the history of Brazilian Music, and in 2008 recorded a special for TVE Bahia.
