= Ituaçu =

Municipality in Bahia, Brazil

- Municipality of Bahia, Brazil
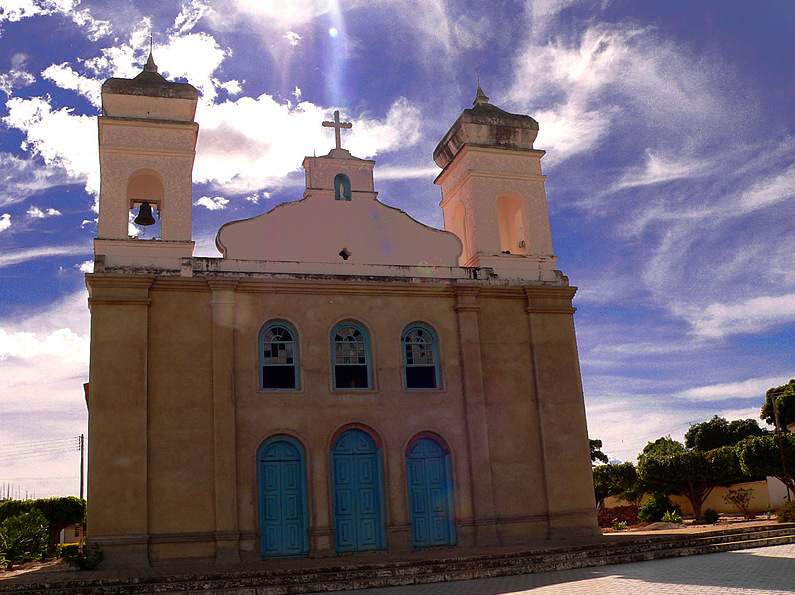
- Our Lady of Alívio church

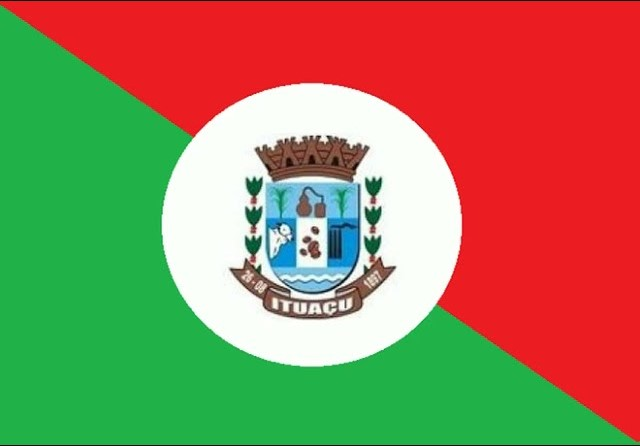
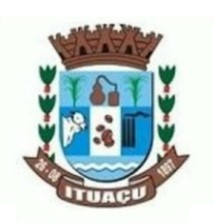
- Flag Coat of arms

- Location of Ituaçu in Bahia

- Location within Brazil Location within South America
- Coordinates: 13°49′S 41°18′W
- Country: Brazil
- Region: Northeast
- State: Bahia
- Founded: 26 August 1897

Government
  - Mayor: Phellipe Ramonn Gonçalves Brito (PSD) (2025-2028)
  - Vice Mayor: Joao Batista Silva Rocha (PSD) (2025-2028)

Area
  - Total: 1,199.374 km^{2} (463.081 sq mi)
- Elevation: 520 m (1,710 ft)

Population (2022)
  - Total: 17,914
  - Density: 14.94/km^{2} (38.7/sq mi)
- Demonym: Ituaçuense (Brazilian Portuguese)
- Time zone: UTC-03:00 (Brasília Time)
- Postal code: 46640-000
- HDI (2010): 0.570 – medium
- Website: ituacu.ba.gov.br

Ituaçu (alternately spelled as Ituassú, Ituassu, or Ituacu) is a city in the Chapada Diamantina region of Bahia, Brazil. The city is 530 km from Salvador, the capital city of Bahia. It is the birthplace of singer Moraes Moreira, while another singer Gilberto Gil lived there from 2 months old. The climate is temperate, falling to 12 °C during the winter. Its estimated population in 2020 is 19,030.
