= Novos Baianos =

Brazilian band

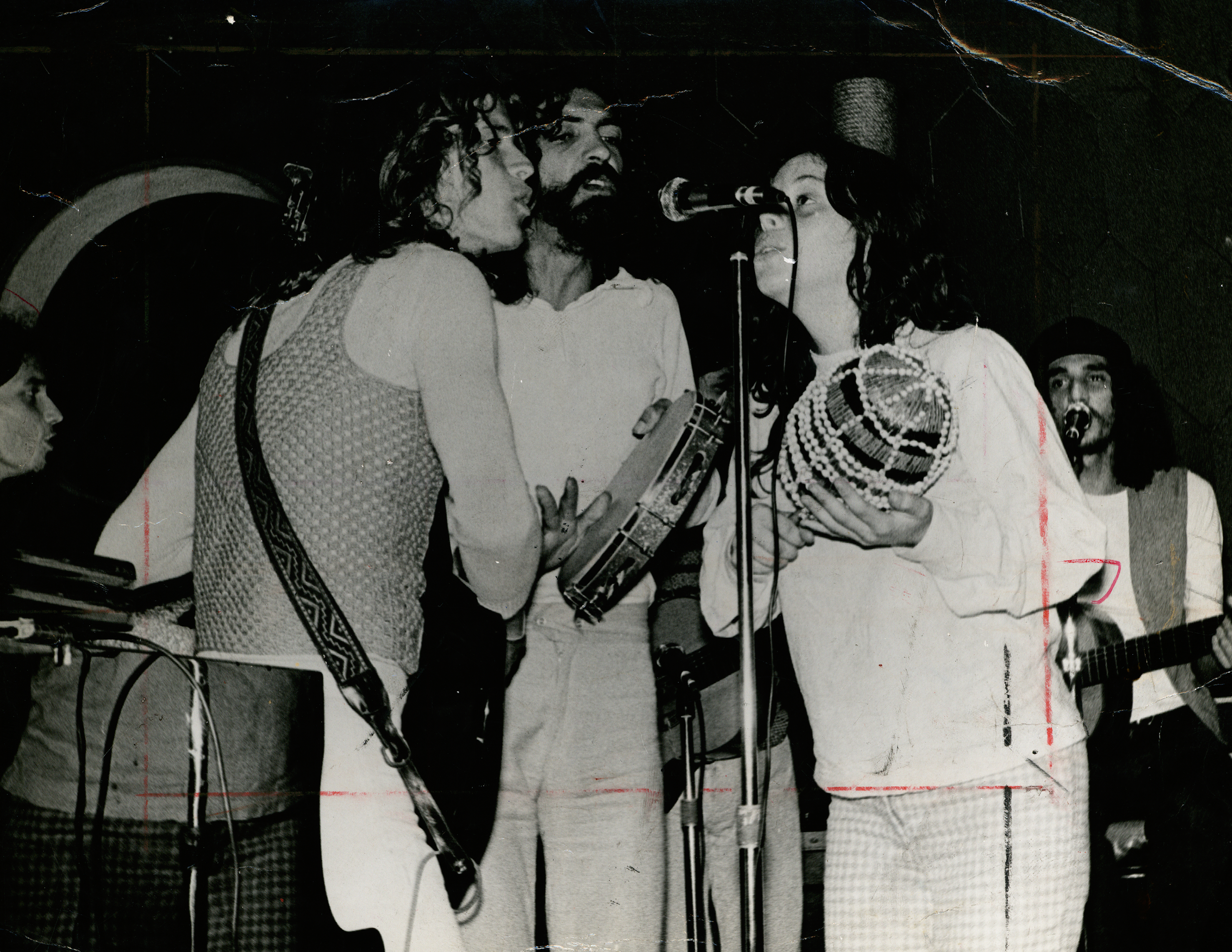
- Novos Baianos in the 70s

Background information
- Origin: Salvador, Bahia, Brazil
- Genres: MPB; samba rock; tropicália; forró; baião; bossa nova
- Years active: 1969–1979; 1997–1999; 2015–2018; 2020
- Labels: RGE; Som Livre; Continental; Tapecar
- Past members: Moraes Moreira; Pepeu Gomes; Baby Consuelo; Paulinho Boca de Cantor; Luiz Galvão; Jorginho Gomes; Dadi Carvalho; José Roberto; Luís Bolacha

Novos Baianos (Brazilian Portuguese: [ˈnɔvuz bajˈɐ̃nus]; English: 'New Bahians') are a Brazilian rock and MPB group founded in Salvador, Bahia in 1969. The group was active between 1969 and 1979, enjoying success throughout the 1970s. The group had reunions in 1997, 2015, and 2020. Together, the group recorded eight full-length studio albums, as well as two live albums.

The group was highly influential on Brazilian popular music and Brazilian rock of the 1970s, combining various musical elements from genres such as samba, bossa nova, frevo, baião, choro, and rock n' roll. The group's music was also heavily influenced by 1970s counterculture and the emerging Tropicália artistic movement.

The group's original line-up consisted of Moraes Moreira (vocals and acoustic guitar), Paulinho Boca de Cantor (vocals), Pepeu Gomes (electric guitar), Baby Consuelo (vocals and percussion), and Luiz Galvão (lyrics).

The group regularly collaborated with A Cor do Som, a sub-group within Novos Baianos, which consisted of Dadi Carvalho (bass), Jorginho Gomes (cavaquinho, drums and percussion), and José "Baixinho" Roberto (drums and percussion). Luís Bolacha (percussion) additionally contributed to the group early in their career.

Novos Baianos is considered one of the most important and revolutionary groups in Brazilian music, primarily as a result of the success and influence of their second studio album, Acabou Chorare.

== History ==
Novos Baianos was formed in 1969 and performed publicly for the first time at a show titled "Desembarque dos Bichos, Depois do Dilúvio", presented in Salvador. During this time, the group consisted of Moreira, Boca de Cantor, Consuelo, and Galvão.

In 1969, the group participated in the V Festival de Música Popular Brasileira, playing the song 'De Vera'. The group's name originated from this performance, which was broadcast on the Rede Record television station, where festival producer Marcos Antônio Riso exclaimed "Bring up these novos baianos!", referring to where the band originated from ("Novos Baianos" is Portuguese for "new Bahians"). This song would later be featured on the group's first studio album, É Ferro na Boneca, which was recorded in 1970. Initially, the group's sound was a fusion of psychedelic rock with traditional folk elements originating from Brazil.

Originally, the group only played with Pepeu Gomes and Jorginho Gomes during their live performances. However, as time progressed, Gomes started to gain an increasingly important role in the group. After he married Consuelo, Gomes became a full-fledged member of the group and began arranging songs along with Moreira.

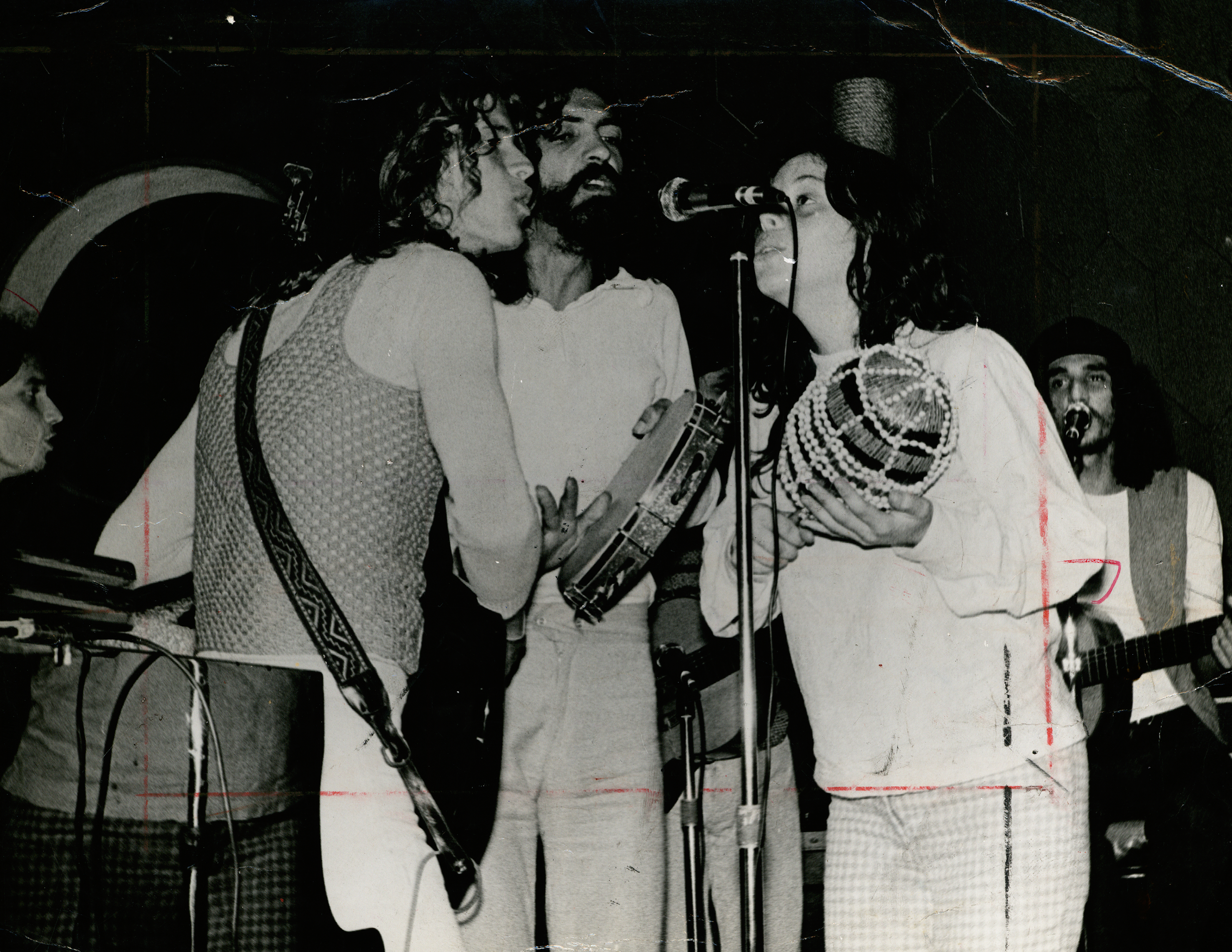
Novos Baianos, 1972.

In the early 1970s, the group's music began to gravitate more towards the MPB genre, particularly due to Brazilian musician João Gilberto's influence, who frequently visited the group. In 1972, Novos Baianos moved to Cantinho do Vovô, a property located near Jacarepaguá, where the group members lived in a communal style. Shortly after moving onto the property, the group began writing and recording material for a new album, which was produced amidst the ongoing military dictatorship in Brazil at the time. As a response to the melancholic sound of their musical contemporaries, the group set out to create a record that would bring a sense of joyfulness to listeners in the face of the authoritarian regime that was in power at the time.

These recording sessions produced the group's second studio album, Acabou Chorare. The album was a commercial success, due in part to the extensive airplay of songs on Brazilian radio stations at the time of the album's release. The album contained some of the group's most popular songs, which included 'Brasil Pandeiro', 'Preta Pretinha', 'Mistério do Planeta', and 'Besta é tu'. It was released on the Som Livre label in 1972, and years later would be ranked as the best Brazilian music album by Rolling Stone magazine. It was around this time that the group incorporated A Cor do Som as an auxiliary band.

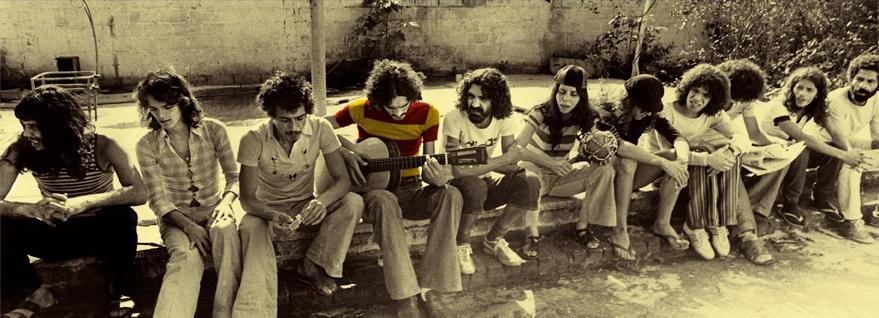
Novos Baianos, 1972.

During this period, the group lived out of a garage, where they primarily focused on playing soccer and composing music. This period of time influenced the name of their third studio album, Novos Baianos F.C., recorded and released on the Continental label in 1973. The group had a strong hippie image during this time period.

The band released numerous records until their break-up in 1979. In 1974, they recorded the first album without Moreira, who decided to start his own solo career in the mid-1970s. As Moreira had previously been the primary composer and arranger of the band's songs (along with Galvão and Gomes) throughout their previous albums, it was a tremendous loss to the group. The remaining members of the group continued producing music after Moreira's departure, incorporating Gato Félix into the group.

In 1976, Carvalho left the group to begin recording and releasing original music with A Cor do Som. In his place, Novos Baianos substituted Didi, the brother of Pepeu Gomes, as the group's bassist. However, the group disbanded in 1979 due to various band members starting their own solo careers. Despite the band's dissolution, Novos Baianos' members reunited many times to celebrate special events (most notably in 1997 and 2015).

In 1997, Luiz Galvão, published Anos 70: Novos e Baianos for Editora 34. In the book, he documents the group's history and its importance to Brazilian music. After Galvão released the book, the group reunited, releasing the live album Infinito Circular in 1997, which was recorded in Metropolitan, Rio de Janeiro. In 2007, Moreira published A História dos Novos Baianos e Outros Versos, a cordel text on the group.

In 2009, the band reunited without Moreira to celebrate 40 years of Novos Baianos and their revolutionary role in Brazilian music. The group (with Moreira) later released their second live album in 2017, titled Acabou Chorare - Novos Baianos Se Encontram, which was recorded during the group's 2015-2018 tour.

Moreira died of a heart attack on 13 April 2020, aged 72. Later that year, the remaining members of the group's original line-up reunited for a show at the Festival Coala music event, as a tribute to Moreira. Galvão later died from an undisclosed illness on 22 October 2022, aged 87.

== Band members ==
=== Primary members ===
- Moraes Moreira – vocals, acoustic guitar (died 2020)
- Paulinho Boca de Cantor – vocals
- Pepeu Gomes – electric guitar
- Baby Consuelo – vocals and percussion
- Luiz Galvão – lyrics (died 2022)

=== Additional members ===
- Dadi Carvalho – bass
- Jorginho Gomes – cavaquinho, drums, percussion
- José "Baixinho" Roberto – drums, percussion (died 2003)
- Luís Bolacha – percussion

== Discography ==
=== Studio albums ===
- 1970 – É Ferro na Boneca (RGE)
- 1972 – Acabou Chorare (Som Livre)
- 1973 – Novos Baianos F.C. (Continental)
- 1974 – Novos Baianos (Continental)
- 1974 – Vamos pro Mundo (Som Livre)
- 1976 – Caia na Estrada e Perigas Ver (Tapecar)
- 1977 – Praga de Baiano (Tapecar)
- 1978 – Farol da Barra (CBS)

=== Live albums ===
- 1997 – Infinito Circular (Globo Polydor)
- 2017 – Acabou Chorare - Novos Baianos Se Encontram (Som Livre)

=== Singles ===
- 1969 – "Colégio de Aplicação" / "De Vera" (RGE)
- 1970 – "Curto da Véu e Grinalda" / "Volta Que o Mundo Dá" (RGE)
- 1971 – "Psiu" / "29 Beijos" / "Globo da Morte" / "Mini Planeta Íris" (Maxi single) (RGE)
- 1971 – "Dê um Rolê" / "Você Me Dá um Disco?" / "Caminho de Pedro" / "Risque" (Maxi single) (Philips)
- 1973 – "No Tcheco Tcheco" / "Boas Festas" (Continental)
- 1973 – "A Minha Profundidade" / " O Prato e a Mesa" (Continental)
- 1976 – "Ninguém Segura Este País" / "Ovo de Colombo" (Tapecar)
- 1979 – "Casei no Natal, Larguei no Reveillon" / "Pra Enlouquecer na Praça" / "Alibabá Alibabou" / "Apoteose do Trio para Dodô" (CBS)
