= Moraes Moreira =

Brazilian musician and songwriter (1947–2020)

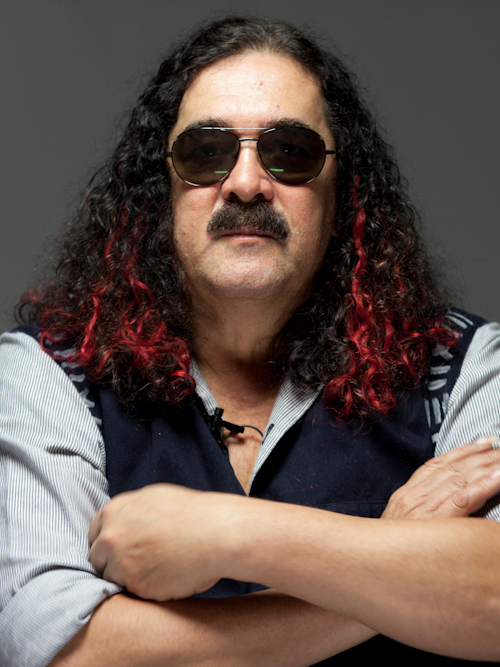
- Moreira in 2010

Background information
- Born: Antônio Carlos Moreira Pires; July 8, 1947; Ituaçu, Bahia, Brazil
- Died: April 13, 2020 (aged 72) Rio de Janeiro, Rio de Janeiro, Brazil
- Genres: MPB; samba; rock; frevo; forró; baião; choro; axé; ijexá
- Instruments: Vocals; guitar
- Years active: 1969–2020
- Labels: Continental; Ariola Discos; Barclay Discos; Discos CBS; Universal Music; Sony Music; Warner Music

Antônio Carlos Moreira Pires (July 8, 1947 – April 13, 2020), better known as Moraes Moreira [moˈɾajz muˈɾejɾa], was a Brazilian musician and songwriter. During the 1970s he played guitar and sang in the band Novos Baianos, after which he embarked on a solo career recording 29 albums. Moreira was involved in recording 40 full-length albums with Novos Baianos and Trio Elétrico Dodô e Osmar, and two more albums with guitarist Pepeu Gomes. Moreira was one of the most versatile composers of Brazil, mixing the genres of rock, samba, choro, frevo, baião, and classical.

== Career ==
=== Novos Baianos ===
Moreira began playing the accordion in festivals at São João and other events in Ituaçu, Brazil such as "Portal da Chapada Diamantina". In his youth he learned to play the classical guitar while taking a science class in Caculé, Bahia, Brazil. He moved to Salvador and there met Tom Zé, and was also introduced to rock music. On meeting Baby Consuelo, Pepeu Gomes, Paulinho Boca de Cantor, and Luiz Galvão, they formed the band Novos Baianos, and were active from 1969 until 1975. Together with Pepeu Gomes, he composed almost all of the songs of the group. The album Acabou Chorare, released by the band in 1972, has been ranked by Rolling Stone Brasil as the greatest Brazilian music album of all time.

=== Solo career ===
Moraes began his solo career in 1975, and has since then recorded more than 20 albums. In his solo career, he was the lead singer in the trio Trio de Dodô e Osmar, and recorded many popular songs associated with Brazilian Carnival, in what was conventionally called "frevo trieletrizado". Some of the hits during this part of his career include, "Pombo Correio", "Vassourinha Elétrica", and "Bloco do Prazer".

During the 1980s he distanced himself from the Bahian Carnival due to increasing commercialization from tourism. In 1994 he recorded "Brasil Tem Concerto" which was influenced by classical music, and in the following year appeared in the MTV Brasil special Moraes Moreira Acústico MTV which was later released as a CD and DVD. In 1997, he recorded the album 50 Carnavais which commemorated his 50th birthday and 50 carnivals. Two years later, he recorded 500 Sambas (in honor of the discovery of Brazil 500 years before) which focused on samba music.

In 2000, he released Bahião com H, playing baião with characteristic Bahian rhythms. In 2003, with the release of Meu Nome é Brasil (2003), he completed his Brazil's themed trilogy, which, also, included Lá Vem o Brasil Descendo a Ladeira (1979) and O Brasil tem Concerto (1994). In 2005, he independently released the album De Repente, which mixed hip hop with Northeastern Brazilian influences and included his characteristic classical guitar swing rhythms. He published the book, A história dos Novos Baianos e outros versos (The History of the Novos Baianos and other verses), in which he told the history of the group in a chapbook and interesting aspects of his solo career. The book resulted in a Brazilian tour of the same name where he played his major hits and recited passages from the book. In 2009, it was released as a DVD and CD. In 2012, he recorded the album A Revolta dos Ritmos, a compilation of 12 of his unedited recordings.

== Death ==
Moreira died on April 13, 2020, at age 72 from a heart attack.

== Solo discography ==
- 1975 – Moraes Moreira (Som Livre)
- 1977 – Cara e Coração (Som Livre)
- 1978 – Alto Falante (Som Livre)
- 1979 – Lá vem o Brasil Descendo a Ladeira (Som Livre)
- 1980 – Bazar Brasileiro (Ariola)
- 1981 – Moraes Moreira (Ariola)
- 1983 – Coisa Acesa (Ariola)
- 1983 – Pintando o Oito (Ariola)
- 1984 – Mancha de Dendê Não Sai (Ariola)
- 1985 – Tocando a Vida (CBS)
- 1986 – Mestiço é Isso (CBS)
- 1988 – República da Música (CBS)
- 1988 – Baiano Fala Cantando (CBS)
- 1990 – Moraes e Pepeu (Warner)
- 1994 – Moraes e Pepeu - Ao vivo no Japão (Warner)
- 1991 – Cidadão (Sony)
- 1993 – Terreiro do Mundo (Polygram)
- 1993 – Tem um Pé no Pelô (Som Livre)
- 1994 – O Brasil tem Conserto (Polygram)
- 1995 – Moraes Moreira Acústico MTV (EMI-Odeon)
- 1996 – Estados (Virgin)
- 1997 – 50 Carnavais (Virgin)
- 1999 – 500 Sambas (Abril Music)
- 2000 – Bahião com H (Atração Fonográfica)
- 2003 – Meu Nome é Brasil (Universal)
- 2005 – De Repente (Rob Digital)
- 2009 – A História dos Novos Baianos e Outros Versos (Biscoito Fino)
- 2012 – A Revolta dos Ritmos (Biscoito Fino)
- 2018 – Ser Tão (Discobertas)
