= Pope Francis Park =

Park in Lisbon, Portugal

- Parque Tejo
- Parque Papa Francisco
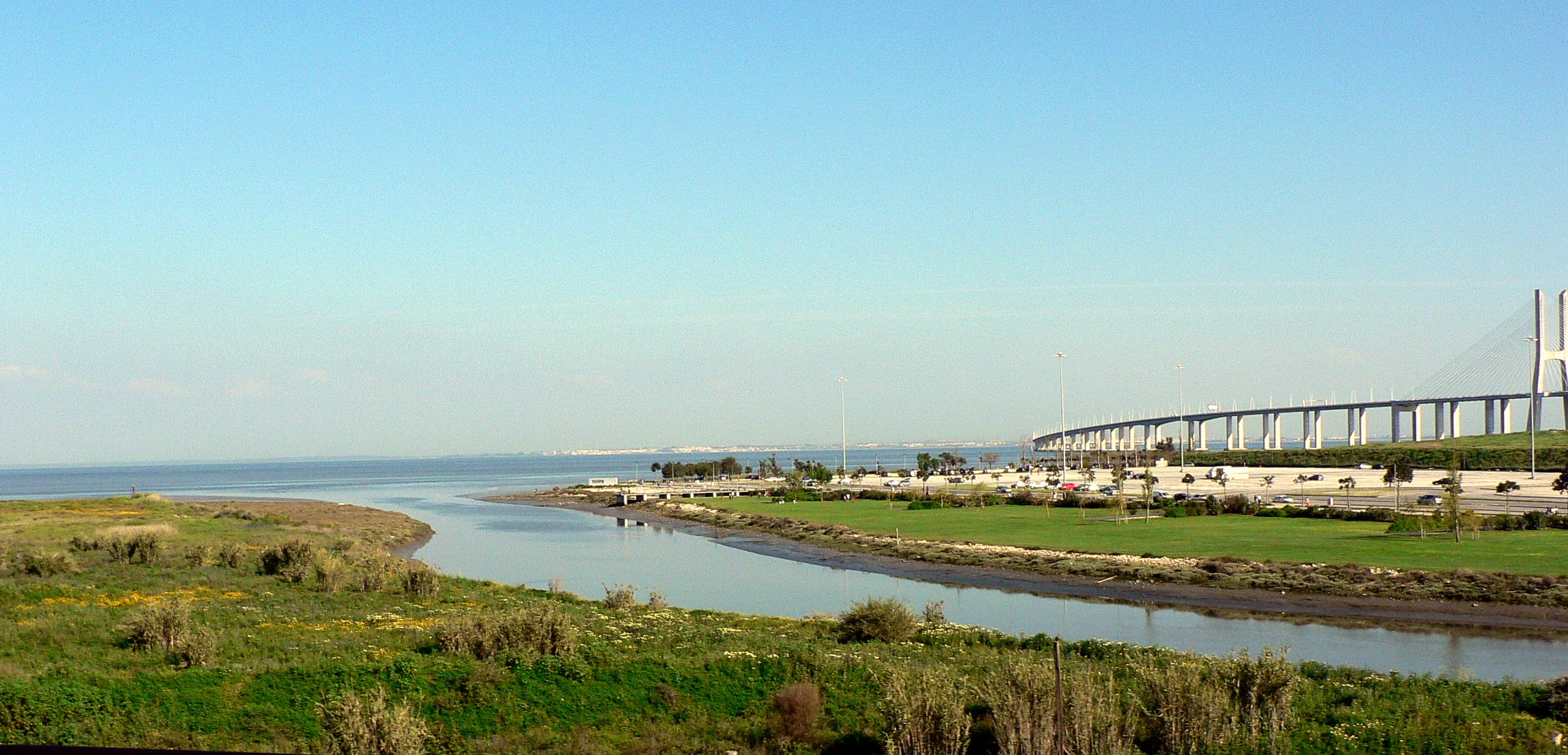
- Mouth of the Trancão River with Pope Francis Park and the Vasco da Gama Bridge in the background
- Interactive map of Pope Francis Park
- Type: Municipal
- Location: Parque das Nações, Lisbon
- Coordinates: 38°47′4.06″N 9°5′34.48″W
- Status: Open all year

Parque Tejo was created in Parque das Nações, Lisbon, Portugal, following the International Exhibition of 1998, based on the idea of re-establishing the environmental quality of the Tagus riverfront.

In 2023, it was renovated under the supervision of the architect António Maria Braga, renamed "Campo da Graça" during World Youth Day 2023, and to Parque Papa Francisco ("Pope Francis Park") in July 2025. On 24 July 2025, it hosted the opening ceremony of the 16th World Scout Moot, with thousands of Rover Scouts camping before heading out on routes across Portugal ahead of a reunion in Cortegaça, Ovar a week later.

== Birdwatching ==
The Parque do Tejo area is a prime spot for waterfowl watching in the city of Lisbon. It is possible to observe:

- squeaks, dark-winged and yellow-legged gulls, pairs of mallards and teals, millerangs and tailorbills;
- Dozens of cormorants, herons, spoonbills, egrets, fusiliers, sandpipers and gray plovers can often be seen on the bridge pillars.
