= Santa Inês, Bahia =

Coordinates: 13°17′31″S 39°49′8″W

Santa Inês
- Municipality
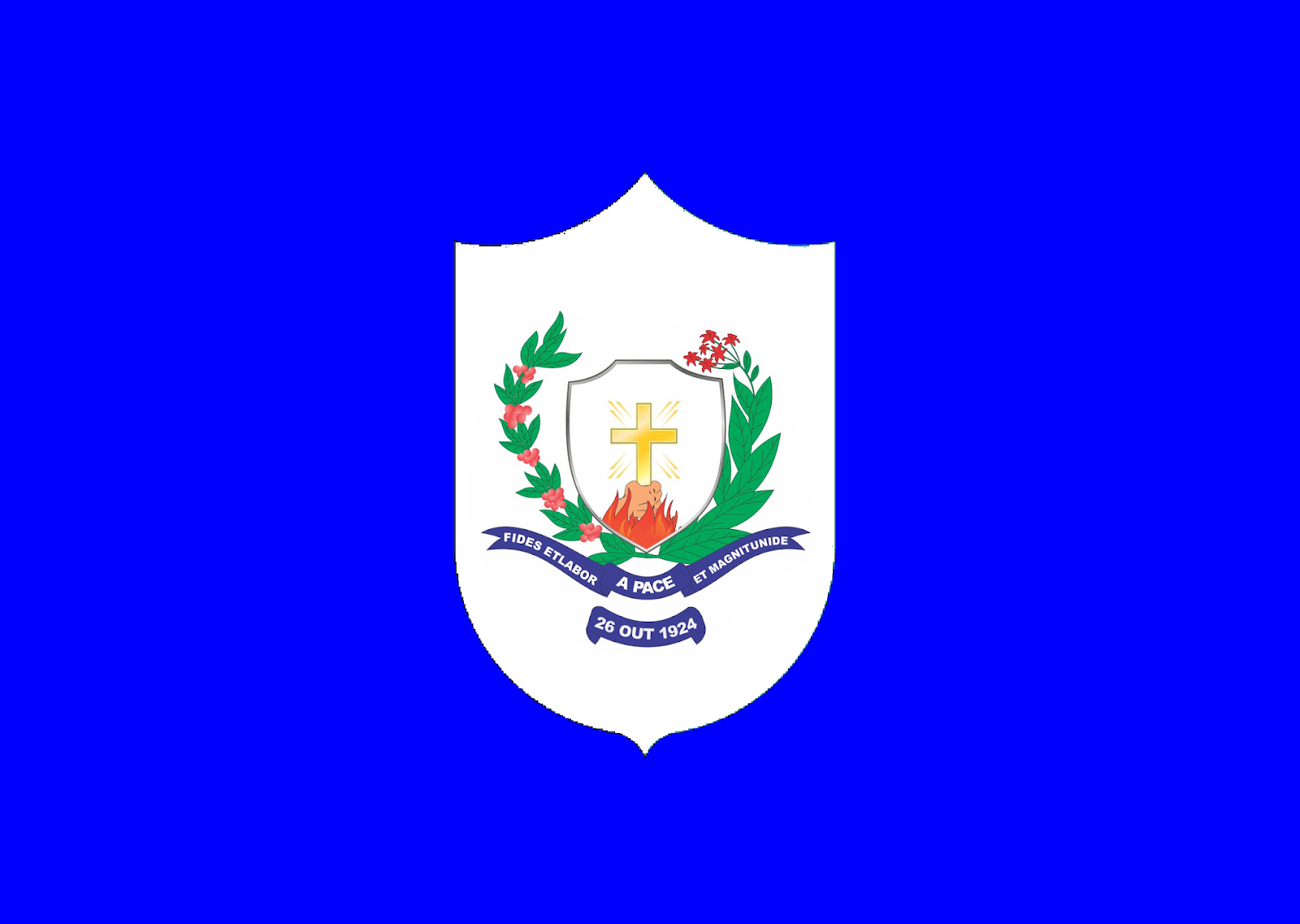
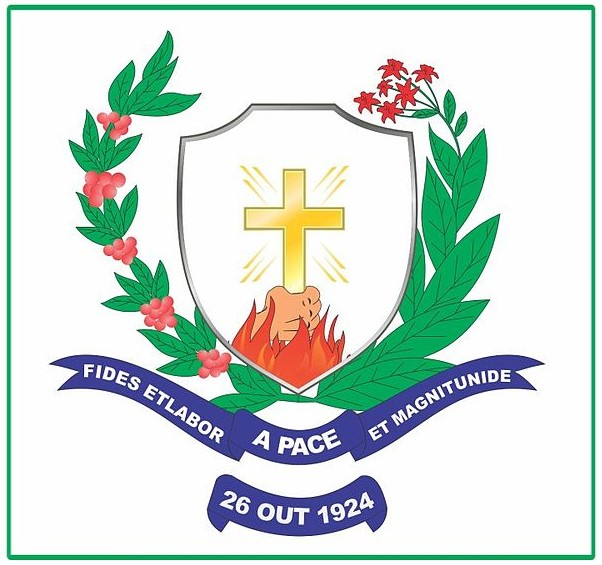
- Flag Coat of arms
- Interactive map of Santa Inês
- Country: Brazil
- Region: Nordeste
- State: Bahia

Population (2022)
  - Total: 10,300
- Time zone: UTC−3 (BRT)

Santa Inês is a municipality in the state of Bahia in the North-East region of Brazil.

== See also ==
- List of municipalities in Bahia
