= Jacob do Bandolim =

Brazilian musician

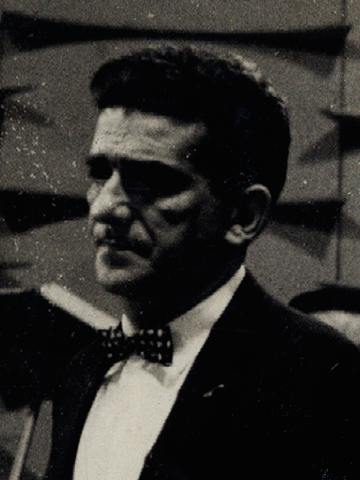

Background information
- Born: Jacob Pick Bittencourt; February 14, 1918
- Origin: Rio de Janeiro, Brazil
- Died: August 13, 1969 (aged 51)
- Genres: Choro
- Occupations: Composer, instrumentalist
- Instrument: Mandolin
- Website: www.jacobdobandolim.com.br

Jacob do Bandolim (born Jacob Pick Bittencourt; February 14, 1918 – August 13, 1969) was a Brazilian composer and musician. Born to a Brazilian-Jewish mother and a gentile father in Rio de Janeiro, his stage name means "Mandolin Jacob", after the instrument he played.

A perfectionist, Jacob was able to achieve from his band Época de Ouro the highest levels of quality. Jacob hated the stereotype of the "dishevelled, drunk folk musician" and required commitment and impeccable dress from his musicians who, like himself, all held "day jobs." Jacob worked as a pharmacist, insurance salesman, street vendor, and finally notary public, to support himself while also working "full time" as a musician.

In addition to his virtuoso playing, he is famous for his many choro compositions, more than 103 tunes, which range from the lyrical melodies of "Noites Cariocas" ("Carioca Nights"), Receita de Samba and "Dôce de Coco" to the aggressively jazzy "Assanhado", which is reminiscent of bebop. He also researched and attempted to preserve the older choro tradition, as well as that of other Brazilian music styles.

== Death and legacy ==
Bandolim died of a heart attack, when coming back from spending the day with Pixinguinha, planning a recording project to benefit his friend. His son Sérgio Bittencourt (1941 - 1979) composed the hit song Naquela Mesa as a tribute to his father.

Jacob had 2 mandolins, which he called "number one" and "number two". After his death, they were kept in storage until 2002, when they received minor restoration. Now under the care of Instituto Jacob do Bandolim, they have been used in a few recordings again.
