= Paulinho Nogueira =

Brazilian musician (1929–2003)

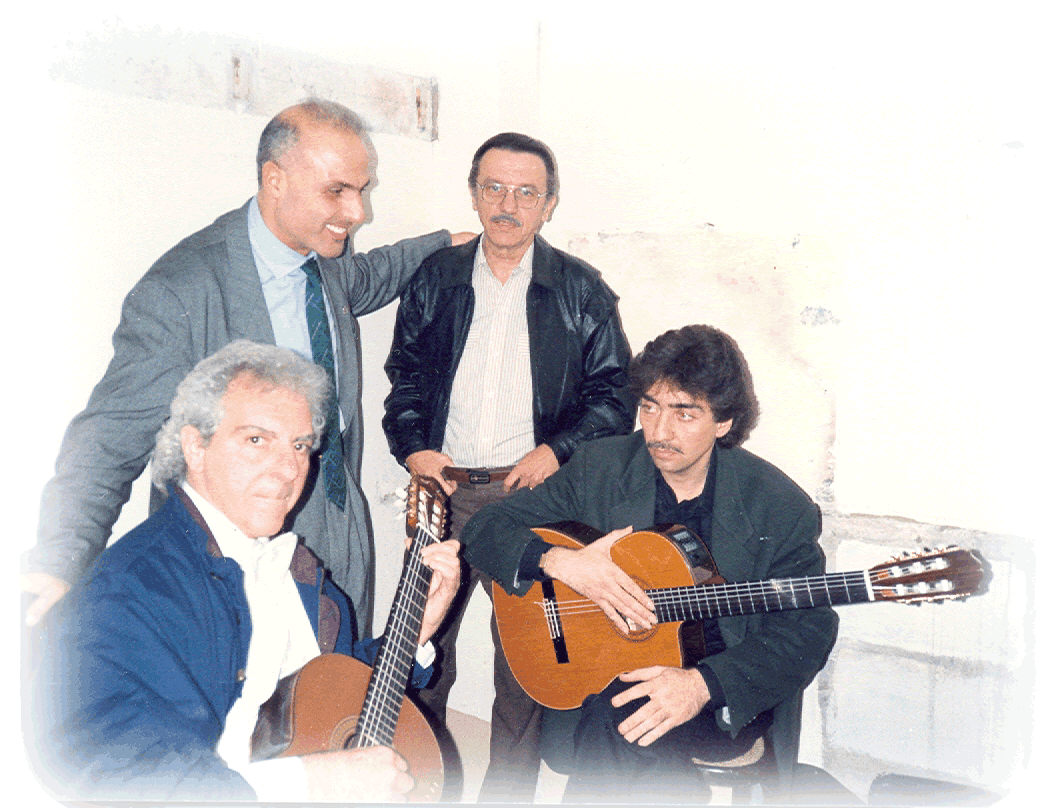
Nogueira, rear right, with Gildo De Stefano, rear left, at the Guitar's International Festival

Paulinho Nogueira (8 October 1929 – 2 August 2003) was a Brazilian guitarist, composer and singer.

== Biography ==
Nogueira was born in Campinas on 8 October 1929. He was an eclectic composer, his influences ranging from bossa nova to Bach. Paulinho Nogueira designed the craviola, a guitar with a sloping bout and offset body shape. He was the teacher of Toquinho.

He died in São Paulo on 2 August 2003.

== Craviola ==
The Craviola is an acoustic guitar designed by Paulinho Nogueira and built by manufacturer Giannini.

Craviolas have a distinct asymmetric body shape that deviates from the upper and lower bouts of classical guitars. Its timbre is said to resemble a combination of sounds from a harpsichord and a viola caipira, hence the portmanteau (Cravo is the Portuguese word for harpsichord).

Craviolas can be six-string or twelve-string (either nylon or steel) and are produced solely by Giannini.

== Discography ==
- A voz do violão (1959) Columbia
- Brasil, violão e sambalanço (1960) RGE
- Menino desce daí/Tema do boneco de palha (1961) RGE 78
- Sambas de ontem e de hoje (1961) RGE
- Outros sambas de ontem e de hoje (1962) RGE
- Mais sambas de ontem e de hoje (1963) RGE
- A nova bossa é violão (1964) RGE
- O fino do violão (1965) RGE
- Sambas e marchas da nova geração (1966) RGE
- Paulinho Nogueira (1967) RGE
- Um festival de violão (1968) RGE
- Isto É Sambalanço (1969) SBA
- Paulinho Nogueira canta suas composições (1970) RGE
- Dez bilhões de neurônios (1972) Continental
- Paulinho Nogueira, violão e samba (1973) Continental 10.108
- Simplesmente (1974) Continental
- Moda de craviola (1975) Continental
- Antologia do violão (1976) Phonogram
- Nas asas do moinho (1979) Alequim
- O fino do violão volume 2 (1980) Bandeirantes/WEA
- Tom Jobim – Retrospectiva (1981) Cristal/WEA
- Água branca (1983) Eldorado
- Tons e semitons (1986) Independente
- Late night guitar – The Brazilian sound of Paulinho Nogueira (1992)
- Coração violão (1995) Movieplay
- Brasil musical – Série música viva – Paulinho Nogueira e Alemã (1996) Tom Brasil
- Sempre amigos (1999) Movieplay
- Reflexões (1999) Malandro Records
- Toquinho Paulinho Nogueira (1998), with Toquinho
- Chico Buarque – Primeiras composições (2002) Trama
