= Baby do Brasil =

Baby do Brasil / Baby Consuelo
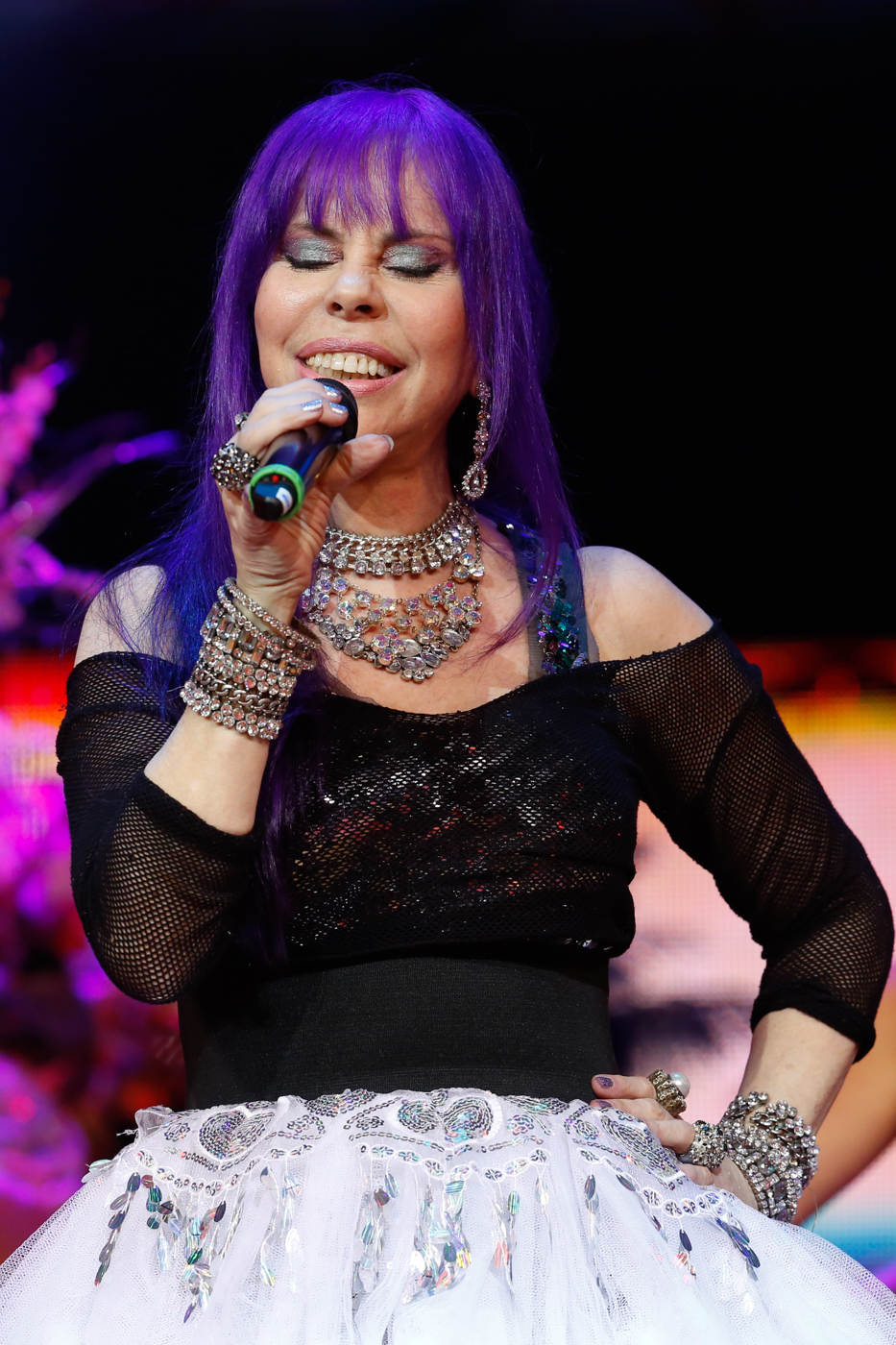

Background information
- Born: Bernadete Dinorah de Carvalho Cidade; July 18, 1952 (age 74) Niterói, Rio de Janeiro, Brazil
- Genres: MPB; bossa nova; pop; samba; folk; rock and roll; contemporary christian music
- Occupations: singer, composer
- Instruments: Vocal, guitar
- Years active: 1969–present

Baby do Brasil, equally known as Baby Consuelo ([ˈbejbi], born Bernadete Dinorah de Carvalho Cidade July 18, 1952), is a Brazilian singer and songwriter.

== Career ==
Although she is known for her energetic performances and compositions in pop, Baby has also composed for the samba and MPB scene.

Early in her career she was a member of Novos Baianos, and was once married to Brazilian guitarist and bandmate Pepeu Gomes. Her 1985 album, "Sem Pecado e Sem Juízo" sold more than 1 million copies.

From her marriage to Pepeu Gomes, she has three daughters (who also made up the Brazilian pop group, SNZ) and three sons, Pedro Baby, Krishna and Kriptus.

== Discography ==
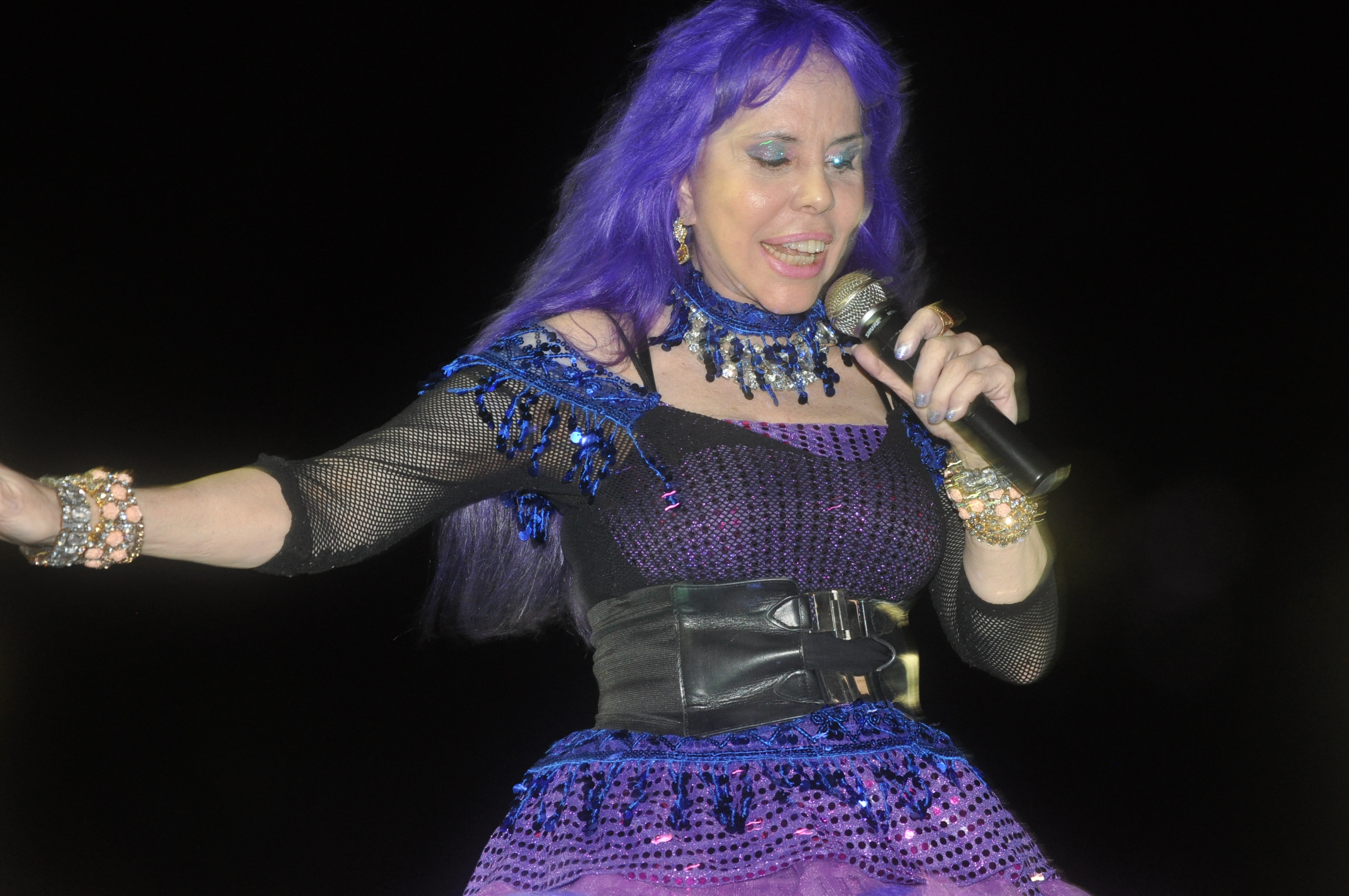
Performing in 2014

=== with Novos Baianos ===
- É Ferro na Boneca (1970)
- Acabou Chorare (1972)
- Novos Baianos F.C. (1973)
- Novos Baianos (1974)
- Vamos Pro Mundo (1974)
- Caia na Estrada e Perigas Ver (1976)
- Praga de Baiano (1977)
- Farol da Barra (1978)
- Infinito Circular (1997, ao vivo)

=== Solo ===
- O Que Vier Eu Traço (1978)
- Pra Enlouquecer (1979)
- Ao Vivo Em Montreux (1980)
- Canceriana Telúrica (1981)
- Cósmica (1982)
- Kryshna Baby (1984)
- Sem Pecado E Sem Juízo (1985)
- Ora Pro Nobis (1991)
- Um (1997)
- Acústico Baby do Brasil (1998)
- Exclusivo Para Deus (2000)
- A Menina Ainda Dança – Baby Sucessos (2015)
