= List of Eldorado FM 30 Greatest Brazilian Music Records =

List of the 30 Best Brazilian Albums, as Selected by Eldorado FM

The list of the 30 greatest albums in Brazilian music by Eldorado FM was selected through a poll conducted by Eldorado FM with the newspaper O Estado de S. Paulo, both of which are part of the Grupo Estado.

== Voting ==
The poll was organized by Eldorado FM, in partnership with the C2+Música section of the newspaper O Estado de S. Paulo, which asked its listeners and online readers, “What is the best Brazilian album of the past few decades?”.

Journalists compiled a preliminary list of 30 titles. To select the finalists, certain criteria were applied, including relevance to the public and critics, as well as current influence on Música popular brasileira (MPB).

Voting was open on the Eldorado FM website from August 25 until midnight on September 4, 2012. On the 5th, the third-place finisher was announced, and on the 6th, the second-place finisher. On September 7, the radio station dedicated its entire 24-hour programming schedule to Brazilian music, and the program Rádio Blog featured the songs from the top-ranked albums. The winning album was announced on the Canta Brasil program, where the album was featured in a segment covering all its tracks. Meanwhile, “C2+ Música,” in the newspaper Estadão, published an article on the most-voted-for album in its September 8 edition.

The album Acabou Chorare by the band Novos Baianos and the debut album Secos & Molhados by the band Secos & Molhados received the same number of votes, 1,168, they received the same number of votes, 1,168, which placed them tied for eighth place on the list. Because of the tie, the list ended in 29th place with the João Bosco’s work Caça à Raposa. The album with the most votes was Ventura, released in 2003 by the band Los Hermanos.

== List ==
The list concluded with the following vote::

Position	Title	Year	Artists	Number of votes
1	Ventura	2003	Los Hermanos	2.816
2	Clube da Esquina	1972	Milton Nascimento and Lô Borges	2.294
3	Dois	1986	Legião Urbana	2.172
4	Elis & Tom	1974	Antônio Carlos Jobim and Elis Regina	2.047
5	Krig-ha, Bandolo!	1973	Raul Seixas	1.773
6	Construção	1971	Chico Buarque	1.585
7	Cabeça Dinossauro	1986	Titãs	1.324
8	Acabou Chorare	1972	Novos Baianos	1.168
8	Secos & Molhados	1973	Secos & Molhados	1.168
9	Tropicália ou Panis et Circencis	1968	Gilberto Gil, Caetano Veloso, Tom Zé, Nara Leão, Os Mutantes and Gal Costa.	903
10	Roberto Carlos	1971	Roberto Carlos	829
11	Sobrevivendo no Inferno	1997	Racionais MC's	702
12	Afrociberdelia	1996	Chico Science & Nação Zumbi	688
13	Cartola II	1976	Cartola	677
14	Chega de Saudade	1959	João Gilberto	674
15	O Dia em Que Faremos Contato	1997	Lenine	466
16	Luz	1982	Djavan	454
17	Tim Maia	1970	Tim Maia	421
18	Álibi	1978	Maria Bethânia	383
19	Samba Esquema Novo	1963	Jorge Ben Jor	377
20	Fruto Proibido	1975	Rita Lee and Tutti Frutti	338
21	Com Você... Meu Mundo Ficaria Completo	1999	Cássia Eller	318
22	Mais	1991	Marisa Monte	317
23	Selvagem?	1986	Os Paralamas do Sucesso	296
24	Ideologia	1988	Cazuza	264
25	-Fa-Tal- Gal a Todo Vapor	1971	Gal Costa	260
26	Cinema Transcendental	1979	Caetano Veloso	211
27	Nervos de Aço	1973	Paulinho da Viola	138
28	Refazenda	1975	Gilberto Gil	129
29	Caça à Raposa	1975	João Bosco	82

== See also ==
- Eldorado FM
- O Estado de S. Paulo
