= Há 10 Mil Anos Atrás =

Studio album by Raul Seixas
- Released: 1976
- Genre: Rock
- Length: 39:44
- Label: Philips/Phonogram
- Producer: Marco Mazzola

Raul Seixas chronology
Novo Aeon (1975)	Há 10 Mil Anos Atrás (1976)	Raul Rock Seixas (1977)

Há 10 Mil Anos Atrás (Portuguese for 10 Thousand Years Ago) is the fourth studio solo album by the Brazilian singer Raul Seixas. It was released in 1976.

== Background ==
Há 10 Mil Anos Atrás has more mystical and introspective songs than Seixas' previous albums, such as "Canto para Minha Morte", "O Homem" and "Eu Nasci Há 10 Mil Anos Atrás". However, happier songs are present as well, such as "Os Números", "Eu Também Vou Reclamar" and "O Dia da Saudade". Also present in the album is an alternative, more electric guitar-oriented version of "As Minas do Rei Salomão", a track originally on Seixas' first album, Krig-Há, Bandolo!.

It was the last album by Seixas with Paulo Coelho as his songwriting partner, although they reunited in 1978 to record Mata Virgem, and his last album to be released by the Philips/Phonogram label.

== Track listing ==
All tracks are written by Raul Seixas and Paulo Coelho unless noted.

No.	Title	English title	Length
1.	"Canto para Minha Morte"	A Song for My Death	3:51
2.	"Meu Amigo Pedro"	My Friend Pedro	4:48
3.	"Ave-Maria da Rua"	Hail Mary of the Streets	4:38
4.	"Quando Você Crescer" (Seixas/Coelho/Vaquer)	When You Grow Up	4:19
5.	"O Dia da Saudade" (Seixas/Vaquer)	Nostalgia Day	2:34
6.	"Eu Também Vou Reclamar"	I'll Complain Too	3:22
7.	"As Minas do Rei Salomão" (alternate version)	King Solomon's Mines	2:57
8.	"O Homem"	The Man	3:04
9.	"Os Números"	The Numbers	2:29
10.	"Cantiga de Ninar"	Lullaby	2:41
11.	"Eu Nasci Há 10 Mil Anos Atrás"	I Was Born 10 Thousand Years Ago	4:51
