= Ouro de Tolo =

Portuguese-language song by Raul Seixas

Single by Raul Seixas

from the album Krig-ha, Bandolo!
- Language: Portuguese
- B-side: "A Hora do Trem Passar"
- Released: May 1973
- Length: 2:52
- Composer(s): Raul Seixas

"Ouro de Tolo" (transl. Fool's Gold) is a song by the Brazilian singer and composer Raul Seixas from his first solo album, Krig-ha, Bandolo! (1973). In 2009, it was chosen by Rolling Stone Brasil as the 16th best Brazilian song.

The name is a reference to the promises of fake alchemists from the Middle Ages. Seixas criticizes the wishes of the middle class who supported the Brazilian Miracle on the Brazilian military dictatorship saying that the conformist and religious views, such as the euphoria of the middle class citizen, were like a fool's gold.

Thus, transposing to Raul Seixas' own ideals and aspirations at the time, one can see that he indicates that the real gold was in the awakening of individual consciousness, aimed at building the Alternative Society, and not in the ufanistic and triumphalist discourse of the military dictatorship of the time. Therefore, the flying saucer at the end of the lyrics would be a reference to this new society to be built.

== Release ==
On June 7, 1973, according to a marketing strategy proposed by Paulo Coelho, Seixas summoned the press to register him walking in Rio Branco Avenue, where he sang "Ouro de Tolo". This was shown during prime time on Brazilian TV. The lyrics were a castigation of the country's conformism about the illusory gains offered by the dictatorship. It instantly became a single and was recorded by Philips Records along with nine other songs for the album Krig-ha, Bandolo!.
