= Construção =

Studio album by Chico Buarque
- Released: 1971
- Genres: MPB; samba
- Length: 31:10
- Language: Portuguese
- Label: Philips
- Producer: Roberto Menescal

Chico Buarque chronology
Chico Buarque de Hollanda (Vol. 4) (1970)	Construção (1971)	Quando o carnaval chegar (1972)

Construção (pronounced [kõstɾuˈsɐ̃w̃]; Portuguese for 'Construction') is the eighth album by Brazilian singer-songwriter Chico Buarque, released in 1971. It was composed in periods between Buarque's exile in Italy and his return to Brazil. Lyrically, the album is loaded with criticisms of the Brazilian military dictatorship, especially with regard to the censorship imposed by the government at the time. It is regarded by music critics as one of the greatest Brazilian albums, and its title track, "Construção", was named the greatest Brazilian song by Rolling Stone in 2009.

== Release ==
Construção was released in 1971 through Philips Records. The album, produced by Roberto Menescal with arrangements by Magro and Rogério Duprat, was issued in LP format in 1971 and reissued on CD in 1988. The front cover of the album features a centered photograph of Buarque against an ochre background, a variation of brown, presented in a simple, classic style. The minimalism of the cover has been interpreted as reflecting the album's portrayal of Brazil's disadvantaged society. The ochre tone, which evokes the color of clay, has been associated with the character and social role of the manual laborer depicted in the title track. On the back cover, the lyrics of the song "Construção" are arranged in three block-like columns resembling stacked bricks, with the intervening spaces suggesting mortar, a layout that visually mirrors the song’s structure and reinforces the album’s overarching construction metaphor.

Radio airplay was significantly boosted by payola, which led to the unusually long title track being broadcast frequently on major stations. As a result, the album sold approximately 140,000 copies in its first four weeks, with about 80 percent of those sales concentrated in the states of São Paulo and Rio de Janeiro. According to a February 1972 issue of the Brazilian magazine Realidade, Philips stated that it had never sold so many LPs in such a short period. In a later documentary, Buarque stated that he did not understand at the time why the song was receiving such extensive radio exposure, noting that he only became aware of the use of payola years afterward.

== Critical reception ==
Professional ratings
Review scores
Source	Rating
AllMusic	5/5 stars
Music Story	5/5 stars
Virgin Encyclopedia of Popular Music	4/5 stars

Construção ranks Number 3 on Rolling Stone's list of 100 greatest Brazilian albums of all time. The magazine also voted "Construção" as the greatest Brazilian song, stating that it "is still a reference to understand a thorny period of Brazilian society". It also ranks Number 54 in the list of the 100 greatest records of the 20th century by the German music magazine Spex. In September 2012, it was elected by the audience of Radio Eldorado FM, of Estadao.com e of Caderno C2+Música (both the latter belong to newspaper O Estado de S. Paulo) as the sixth best Brazilian album. In the list Los 600 de Latinoamérica, a ranking created by several Latin American music journalists, it was ranked at number 5 for albums released during the years 1920 to 2022, being the highest for a Brazilian album.

== Track listing ==
All tracks are written by Chico Buarque, except where noted.

Side one
No.	Title	Length
1.	"Deus Lhe Pague" ("God Bless You")	3:20
2.	"Cotidiano" ("Everyday")	2:50
3.	"Desalento" ("Dismay") (Chico Buarque, Vinicius de Moraes)	2:50
4.	"Construção" ("Construction")	6:30

Side two
No.	Title	Length
5.	"Cordão" ("Cord")	2:35
6.	"Olha Maria" ("Look Maria") (Tom Jobim, Chico Buarque, Vinicius de Moraes)	3:57
7.	"Samba de Orly" ("Orly Samba") (Chico Buarque, Toquinho, Vinicius de Moraes)	2:40
8.	"Valsinha" ("Little Waltz") (Chico Buarque, Vinicius de Moraes)	2:00
9.	"Minha História" ("My Story") (Adapted by Chico Buarque, written by Lucio Dalla, Paola Pallotino)	3:05
10.	"Acalanto" ("Lullaby")	1:40

== Personnel ==
Credits adapted from AllMusic and Construção's liner notes.

- Chico Buarque – Primary artist, vocals
- Roberto Menescal – Producer, studio direction
- Magro – Music director
- Tom Jobim – Guest artist
- MPB4 – Guest artist
- Paulinho Jobim – Guest artist
- Marco Mazzola – Technician
- Toninho Barbosa – Technician
- Aldo Luiz – Artwork
- Carlos Leonam – Photography
