= Novo Aeon =

Studio album by Raul Seixas
- Released: 1975
- Genre: Rock
- Length: 33:00
- Label: Philips/Phonogram
- Producer: Marco Mazzola

Raul Seixas chronology
Gita (1974)	Novo Aeon (1975)	Há 10 Mil Anos Atrás (1976)

Novo Aeon ('New Aeon') is the third solo studio album by the Brazilian musician Raul Seixas. Released in 1975, most of the album was heavily influenced by the work of Aleister Crowley and other occultists, with the major example being the title track. Not as successful as Seixas' previous album, Gita, it was a sales failure. However, it contains some of his most famous songs, such as "Tente Outra Vez", "Rock do Diabo" and "A Maçã".

In 2007, the Brazilian version of the magazine Rolling Stone chose Novo Aeon as the 53rd most revolutionary Brazilian album of all time.

== Track listing ==
All tracks are written by Raul Seixas and Paulo Coelho unless noted.

No.	Title	English title	Length
1.	"Tente Outra Vez" (Seixas/Coelho/Marcelo Motta)	Try Again	2:26
2.	"Rock do Diabo"	Devil's Rock	2:15
3.	"A Maçã" (Seixas/Coelho/Motta)	The Apple	3:26
4.	"Eu Sou Egoísta" (Seixas/Motta)	I Am Selfish	2:51
5.	"Caminhos"	Paths	1:51
6.	"Tu És o M.D.C. da Minha Vida"	Thou Art the G.C.D. of My Life	3:55
7.	"A Verdade Sobre a Nostalgia"	The Truth About Nostalgia	2:09
8.	"Para Noia" (Seixas)	Pun with "Paranoia" and "Para Noia" (Portuguese for "Stop the Madness")	3:56
9.	"Peixuxa (O Amiguinho dos Peixes)" (Seixas/Motta)	Peixuxa (The Fishes' Buddy)	2:13
10.	"É Fim de Mês" (Seixas)	It's the End of the Month	3:03
11.	"Sunseed" (Seixas/Glória Vaquer)		2:42
12.	"Caminhos II" (Eládio Gilbraz/Coelho/Seixas)	Paths II	1:00
13.	"Novo Aeon" (Seixas/Cláudio Roberto/Motta)	New Aeon	2:34
