= Construção (song) =

1971 song by Chico Buarque

Single by Chico Buarque

from the album Construção
- Language: Portuguese
- English title: Construction
- B-side: "Cotidiano"
- Released: 1971
- Genre: MPB; samba
- Length: 6:24
- Label: Philips
- Songwriter: Chico Buarque
- Producer: Roberto Menescal

Audio
- "Construção" on YouTube

"Construção" (pronounced [kõstɾuˈsɐ̃w]; Portuguese for 'Construction') is a song by the Brazilian singer and composer Chico Buarque, recorded and released in 1971 for his album of the same name through Philips Records. Written shortly after Buarque's return from self-imposed exile in Italy, the song emerged during the height of Brazil's military dictatorship and has been widely interpreted as a critical portrayal of urban labor and social alienation.

Musically, "Construção" is notable for its strict poetic structure, consisting of dodecasyllabic verses that end exclusively in proparoxytones and are rearranged across three successive sections. Narrated in an impersonal third person, the lyrics recount the final day of a construction worker whose death is depicted as a disruption to public order rather than a human tragedy. The arrangement by Rogério Duprat progressively layers orchestral elements over a minimalist harmonic base.

Despite its implicit social critique, the song passed through censorship without cuts and achieved significant commercial circulation following its release. Retrospectively, "Construção" has been regarded as a landmark in Brazilian popular music and a turning point in Buarque's career. It has appeared prominently in critical rankings of Brazilian songs, including being ranked second in a 2001 poll conducted by Folha de S.Paulo and first by Rolling Stone Brasil in its 2009 list of the greatest Brazilian songs of all time.

== Background ==
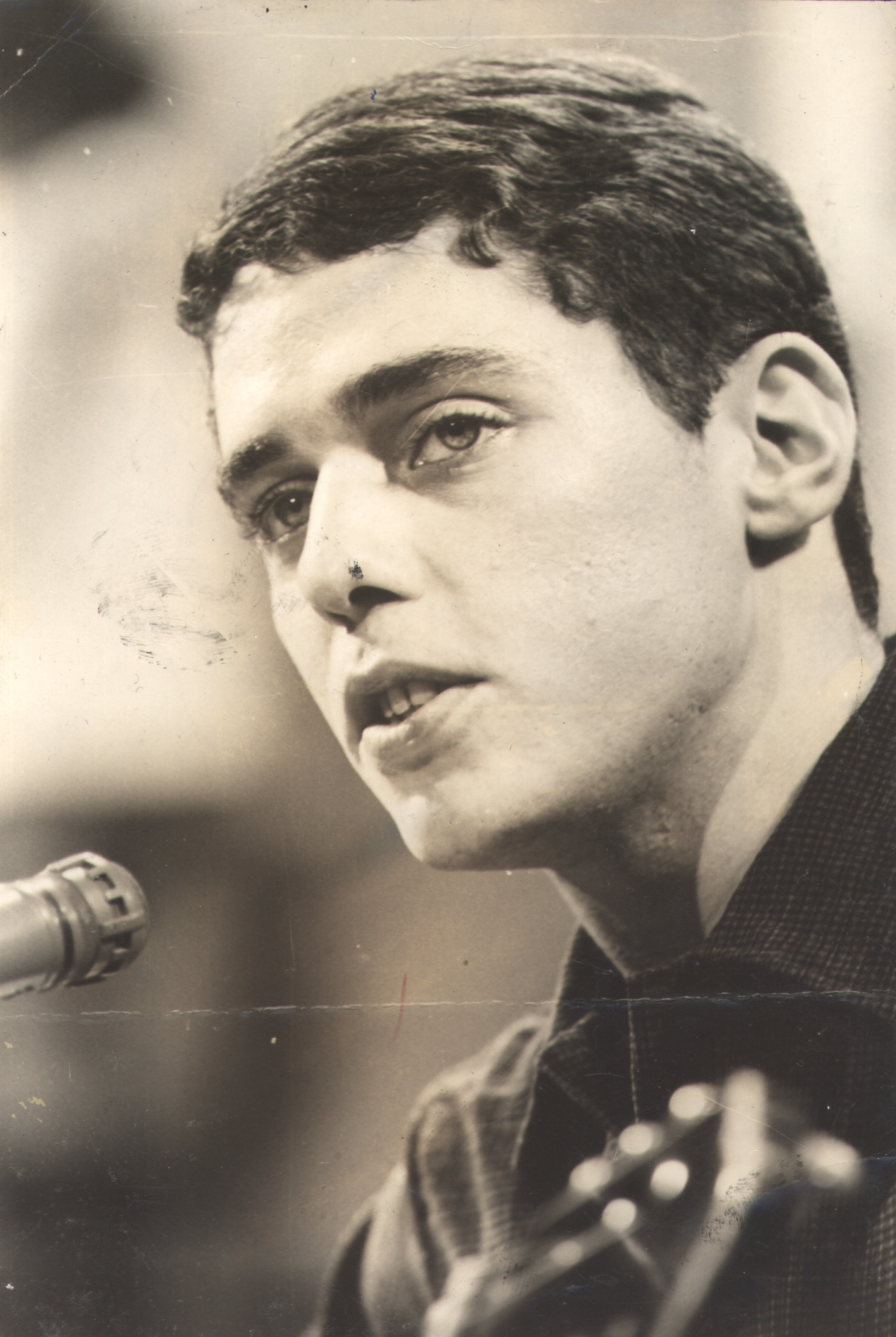
Chico Buarque performing in 1967

"Construção" was written during Brazil's military regime (1964–1985), a period marked by political repression, censorship, and the persecution of artists and intellectuals. In the early 1970s, the regime promoted what became known as the Brazilian Miracle, a phase of rapid economic growth driven by industrial expansion, large-scale infrastructure projects, and state-led modernization. This growth, however, coincided with restrictions on civil liberties, widespread censorship, and systemic human rights abuses.

The construction sector occupied a central role in this economic expansion. Civil construction projects multiplied in major urban centers, fueled in part by policies of the National Housing Bank, which financed developments using workers' compulsory savings funds. While these projects symbolized progress in official discourse, construction workers often faced low wages, long working hours, and precarious safety conditions. Workplace accidents were frequent, and fatalities on construction sites were widely reported during the period.

Buarque himself went into self-imposed exile in Italy in 1969, returning the following year. Upon his return, his songwriting adopted a more explicitly political tone. "Construção" was written during this transitional period and has been described by multiple journalists as a turning point in his work. Scholar Alexandre Faria characterized the song as an example of "protest without concession", marking a shift from subtle criticism to more direct political engagement.

== Composition ==
=== Overview ===
"Construção"
A 30-second sample from the beginning of "Construção", an MPB song with a samba-based rhythmic pulse.

"Construção" is a MPB song built on a steady samba-based rhythmic pulse. The recording was produced by Roberto Menescal, with an arrangement by Rogério Duprat, whose work incorporated orchestral layering associated with techniques developed during the Tropicália period. "Construção" consists of 41 dodecasyllabic lines, each ending with a proparoxytone. The use of proparoxytones, numbering twenty distinct examples, creates a recurring phonetic pattern. The song is divided into three sections: two of seventeen lines each and a final section of seven lines. The first two sections are almost identical, differing only in the last word of each verse, which is systematically replaced to alter meaning. The final section reorders these endings more freely.

Buarque's vocal delivery, joined by MPB-4 in the chorus, follows melodic descensions that align with the proparoxytone endings. Pauses are used at points describing the worker's death, leaving only the voice before the arrangement resumes. The final section is performed without pauses, leading to a musical climax. The composition uses only two related chords. The arrangement gradually adds instrumentation as the narrative progresses. The song opens with guitar, bass, and light percussion, later incorporating piano, wind instruments, and brass. Duprat employed these additions to create an urban soundscape. In recordings including the original 1971 release, the song transitions into three stanzas from "Deus Lhe Pague", also from the same album, presented as a response from the deceased worker.

=== Lyrics and themes ===
"Construção" functions as a chronicle or epic poem, narrating, in an impersonal third-person voice, a day in the life of an urban construction worker from his departure from home to his fatal fall from a building. The death depicted in the song reflected a common occurrence rather than an exceptional event, underscoring the human cost of accelerated urban development. Within the narrative, the protagonist's death is framed as a disruption to public routine rather than as a personal tragedy. Scholar Charles A. Perrone has compared the piece to Buarque's earlier "Pedro Pedreiro". Academic Adilson Citelli likewise compared it to Brazilian poet Vinicius de Moraes's poem "O Operário Em Construção", noting its comparatively pessimistic conclusion. The song's lyrics are seen as a strong critique of the alienation of the worker in a modern, urban capitalist society, reduced to a mechanical condition, especially intensified in the third stanza. Through its indirect treatment of dehumanization and exploitation, the song has also been read as a veiled criticism of the political and economic system of the era. Literary scholar Adélia Bezerra de Meneses characterized "Construção" as a "painful testimony of the demeaning relations between capital and labor". She argued that the song addresses the precarious working conditions, low wages, long hours, and frequent accidents in Brazil's rapidly expanding civil construction sector.

The song's opening line, "Amou daquela vez como se fosse a última" ('He loved that time as if it were the last time'), serves as foreshadowing of the worker's tragic fate. In the phrase "Ergueu no patamar quatro paredes sólidas/mágicas/flácidas" ('He built four solid/magic/flaccid walls on the balcony', the transformation of walls has been interpreted as reflecting the progressive dehumanization and eventual demise of the protagonist. The phrase "Tijolo com tijolo num desenho mágico/lógico" ('Brick after brick in a magical/logical design') is self-referential, describing the song's own structure. The lyrics make extensive use of what academics called acoplamento (coupling), a linguistic device in which parallel syntactic positions are filled with phonetically or semantically similar elements, producing strong internal cohesion and memorability. Examples include the repetition of the preterite perfect tense for verbs of motion, the semantic equivalence of location words such as a rua, construção, and no patamar, and the phonetic similarity of the proparoxytone endings.

== Release and artwork ==
"Construção" was released in 1971 through Philips Records as the title track of Buarque's album of the same name. The album was issued in LP format in 1971 and reissued on CD in 1988. The front cover of the 1971 album Construção features a centered photograph of Buarque against an ochre background, a variation of brown, presented in a simple, classic style. The minimalism of the cover has been interpreted as reflecting the album's portrayal of Brazil's disadvantaged society. The ochre tone, which evokes the color of clay, has been associated with the character and social role of the manual laborer depicted in the title track. The album's back cover visually reflects the song's structure by arranging the lyrics in three blocks that resemble stacked bricks, with the spaces between them representing "cement", reinforcing the "construction" metaphor.

Despite its critical content, "Construção" passed through censorship without cuts. According to later accounts, an informal request by the record label's lawyer for the song to be banned—intended to generate publicity—resulted in the opposite outcome, with censors approving its release out of spite. Following the album's release, Buarque came under increased surveillance from censorship authorities. In a 1973 interview, he characterized the work primarily as a formal experiment or "game with bricks", referring to its wordplay with proparoxytones, rather than as an explicit protest about workers' conditions. He acknowledged, however, that placing a human character at the center of this "word game" inevitably provoked an emotional response from listeners.

== Reception and legacy ==
"Construção" was widely regarded as an important work in Brazilian music and a significant release in the singer's career. Radio airplay was significantly boosted by payola, which led to the unusually long title track being broadcast frequently on major stations. As a result, the album sold approximately 140,000 copies in its first four weeks. In a later documentary, Buarque stated that he did not understand at the time why the song was receiving such extensive radio exposure, noting that he only became aware of the use of payola two decades afterward. Brazilian musician Tom Jobim adored the song. According to his son Paulo Jobim, his father cut out the lyrics from a newspaper at the time and pasted them into a notebook. Tom commented on the perfection of the lyrics, noting that Buarque used proparoxytone words with rare mastery.

Retrospectively, the song was received favorably in Novabrasil, where writer Lívia Nolla regarded it as a "song that revolutionized Brazilian music". For musicologists Jairo Severiano and Zuza Homem de Mello, "Construção" has "extraordinary lyrics, of a quality rarely found in popular songs". In 2001, the newspaper Folha de S.Paulo conducted a poll of 214 voters, including journalists, musicians, and artists from Brazil, in which "Construção" received 21 votes and was ranked the second greatest Brazilian song of all time, behind "Águas de Março" by Tom Jobim. In 2009, "Construção" was selected by the Brazilian edition of Rolling Stone as the greatest Brazilian song of all time. An instrumental version of the song was featured in the 2016 Summer Olympics opening ceremony in Rio de Janeiro. The song is widely used in secondary education, particularly in history classes addressing the military dictatorship and in Portuguese-language instruction focused on poetic meter and stress patterns.

== Personnel ==
According to the album's liner notes.

- Chico Buarque – vocals, composer
- Roberto Menescal – production, studio manager
- Rogério Duprat – arrangement
- Magro Waghabi – musical director
- MPB4 – backing vocals
- Aldo Luiz – cover art
- Marco Mazzola – audio engineer
