= Krig-ha, Bandolo! =

Studio album by Raul Seixas
- Released: 1973
- Recorded: 1973
- Genres: Rock and roll, rockabilly, country rock, folk rock
- Length: 28:52
- Label: Philips/Phonogram
- Producers: Marco Mazzola and Raul Seixas

Raul Seixas chronology
Os 24 Maiores Sucessos da Era do Rock (1973)	Krig-ha, Bandolo! (1973)	Gita (1974)

Krig-ha, Bandolo! is the first solo album by the Brazilian singer Raul Seixas. It was released in 1973.

== Background ==
The album's title refers to Hal Foster's Tarzan comic strips. In the comic, "Krig-ha, Bandolo" was one of Tarzan's war cries, meaning "Watch out, the enemy's near".

The album's opening track is a recording of a 9-year-old Raul Seixas singing to Roy Brown's "Good Rockin' Tonight". It was the first album of many with Paulo Coelho as Seixas' songwriting partner, and includes some of Seixas' greatest hits, such as "Mosca na Sopa", "Metamorfose Ambulante", "Al Capone" and "Ouro de Tolo".

In 2007, the Brazilian version of Rolling Stone chose Krig-ha, Bandolo! as the 12th best Brazilian album of all time. The magazine also voted "Ouro de Tolo" and "Metamorfose Ambulante", respectively, as the 16th and the 39th greatest Brazilian songs. In September 2012, it was elected by the audience of Radio Eldorado FM, of Estadão.com and Caderno C2+Música (both the latter belong to newspaper O Estado de S. Paulo) as the fifth best Brazilian album ever.

== Track listing ==
All tracks are written by Raul Seixas unless noted.

No.	Title	English title	Length
1.	"Good Rockin' Tonight" (Brown)		0:52
2.	"Mosca na Sopa"	A Fly in the Soup	4:01
3.	"Metamorfose Ambulante"	Walking Metamorphosis	3:52
4.	"Dentadura Postiça"	Fake Dentures	1:32
5.	"As Minas do Rei Salomão" (Seixas/Coelho)	King Solomon's Mines	2:24
6.	"A Hora do Trem Passar" (Seixas/Coelho)	It's Time for the Train to Pass	1:52
7.	"Al Capone" (Seixas/Coelho)		2:42
8.	"How Could I Know"		2:40
9.	"Rockixe" (Seixas/Coelho)	Portmanteau of the words "Rock" and "Maxixe"	3:47
10.	"Cachorro Urubu" (Seixas/Coelho)	Crow Dog	2:11
11.	"Ouro de Tolo"	Fool's Gold	2:52
