= Raul Seixas =

Brazilian singer-songwriter and music producer (1945–1989)

Raul Seixas OMC
- Seixas in 1972
- Born: Raul Santos Seixas; 28 June 1945; Salvador, Bahia, Brazil
- Died: 21 August 1989 (aged 44); São Paulo, Brazil
- Occupations: Singer-songwriter; musician; producer
- Years active: 1963–1989
- Spouses: Edith Wisner (m. 1967; div. 1974) Gloria Vaquer (m. 1975; div. 1978)
- Children: 3
- Musical career
- Genres: Rock; rock and roll; rockabilly; folk rock; baião; country rock
- Instruments: Vocals; guitar
- Labels: EMI Odeon; Columbia/CBS; Philips/Phonogram; Warner; Eldorado; Som Livre; Copacabana
- Formerly of: Os Panteras

Raul Santos Seixas (Note: Brazilian Portuguese pronunciation: [ʁaˈuw ˈsɐ̃tus ˈsejʃas].) (28 June 1945 – 21 August 1989) was a Brazilian singer, songwriter, producer, and multi-instrumentalist, considered the "Father of Brazilian Rock". His musical work consists of seventeen albums released during his 26-year career. His musical style is traditionally classified as rock and baião, and he did indeed manage to unite both genres in songs like "Let me Sing, Let me Sing". His debut album, Raulzito e os Panteras (1968), was produced when he was part of the group Raulzito e os Panteras, but he only gained critical and public acclaim with songs like "Ouro de Tolo", "Mosca na Sopa" and "Metamorfose Ambulante," from the album Krig-ha, Bandolo! (1973). Raul Seixas had a musical style that was called "rebellious and mystical". This is due to the ideals he championed, such as the Alternative Society presented in the album Gita (1974), influenced by figures like the British occultist Aleister Crowley.

Skeptical and agnostic, Raul was interested in philosophy (mainly metaphysics and ontology), psychology, history, literature, and Latin. Some ideas from these fields were heavily incorporated into his work, which was well-received or at least sparked curiosity because of this. He was one of the most acclaimed artists of his decade. In the 1980s, his career declined, but he continued producing albums that sold well, such as Raul Seixas (1983), Uah-Bap-Lu-Bap-Lah-Béin-Bum! (1987), and A Panela do Diabo (1989), the latter in partnership with his friend and fellow Bahian, Marcelo Nova. His musical output has continuously grown, as his records (especially posthumous albums) continue to sell, making him a symbol of Brazilian rock and one of the most revered and beloved artists among fans in recent years. In October 2008, Rolling Stone magazine published its list of the 100 Greatest Artists of Brazilian Music, placing Raul Seixas at number 19, surpassing names like Milton Nascimento, Maria Bethânia, Heitor Villa-Lobos, and others. The previous year, the same magazine published a list of the One Hundred Greatest Albums of Brazilian Music, where two of his albums appeared: Krig-ha, Bandolo!, at number 12, and Novo Aeon, at number 53.

In 2025, Raul Seixas's life story was portrayed in the miniseries Raul Seixas: Eu Sou, released by Globoplay in celebration of the artist's 80th birthday. Directed by Paulo and Pedro Morelli and starring Ravel Andrade, the production dramatizes significant moments in the musician's life and career, from his childhood in Salvador to his consecration as an icon of Brazilian rock. The soundtrack, produced by musician Kassin, was praised for its careful recreation of the sounds of the 1970s and 1980s. The series also highlights collaborations such as Raul's with Paulo Coelho, his experiences with occultism, and the repression he suffered during the military dictatorship.

== Life and career ==
Seixas was born on 28 June 1945 in Salvador, Bahia, to a middle-class family. As a child living near the United States consulate, he became fluent in the English language, and was introduced to early rock and roll records of artists such as Little Richard, Jerry Lee Lewis and Elvis Presley through his contacts with American diplomats' children around 1956. Presley's music in particular was influential in young Raul's decision to become a musician. At the age of twelve, Seixas formed his first group, The Panthers, later changing their name to the Portuguese-language Raulzito e os Panteras ("Little Raul and The Panthers"). They appeared on TV Itapoan doing covers of Lewis, Little Richard and Presley, a style of music which was at the time called "cowboy music" in Brazil.

In the mid-1960s, Os Panteras started backing some of Brazil's most famous pop singers of the time, such as Jerry Adriani whenever they went to Salvador. Impressed with their talent, the stars would always advise Raul to move down south and take a chance in the thriving Jovem Guarda scene.

Following the promises of fame and fortune, the band moved to Rio de Janeiro in 1967. In the following year they released their first and only album on the Odeon label (later EMI-Odeon), which included a Portuguese language version of the Beatles' song "Lucy in the Sky with Diamonds" among many original numbers. Without any publicity, the record sunk and the band disbanded. Seixas was totally shaken by the failure of the Panteras, and his return to Salvador. He wrote: "I spent all day locked in my room reading philosophy, with only a very feeble light, what ended up spoiling my eyesight [...] I bought a motorcycle and did crazy things in the street."

After his former bandmates moved back to Salvador, Seixas made a living as an English teacher before being hired by CBS, still in 1968, as creative director and record producer. In 1971, tired of writing and producing records by bland, commercial artists, he took advantage of a label director's vacations and produced Sociedade da Grã-Ordem Kavernista Apresenta Sessão das Dez, an avant-garde album featuring himself, singer Sergio Sampaio, samba artist Miriam Batucada and Edy Star. The record's mix of Tropicalia, rock and roll and anarchic surrealistic experiments launched Raul Seixas as an icon of Brazilian counterculture.

In the 1970s, Seixas became popular in urban centers such as Rio de Janeiro and São Paulo. Music broadcast on TV and radio was satirical, sarcastic with esoteric themes. References to a wide range of historical and fictional personalities are found within his lyrics: The Beatles, Aleister Crowley, Al Capone, Marlon Brando, Jesus, Julius Caesar and Shakespeare, for example. Seixas was subject to censorship during Brazil's period of military dictatorship. Like the music of his contemporaries such as Chico Buarque and others, Seixas's lyrics hide political messages within double meanings.

1971 also saw the beginning of a relationship with esoteric author Paulo Coelho, beginning with Krig-Há-Bandolo in 1973. Through Coelho, Seixas was introduced to the work of controversial English mystic Aleister Crowley, which influenced their collaboration. The influence extended not only to music, but also to plans for the creation of the "Sociedade Alternativa" (Alternative Society), which was to be an anarchist community in the state of Minas Gerais based on Crowley's premise: "'Do what thou wilt' shall be the whole of the Law." The project was considered subversive by members of the Brazilian military, which imprisoned all prospective members of the group. Seixas and Coelho are reported to have been tortured during their imprisonment.

Seixas got into self-exiling himself in the United States following the presumed detention by government repressive agents, where his American wife of the time was living. (Seixas was legally married twice to Edith Wisner and Gloria Vaquer Seixas.) He has three daughters. He would later claim that during his exile he had met his childhood heroes John Lennon and Jerry Lee Lewis, although this claim has been disputed.

== Death ==
The 50 performances across Brazil resulted in what would be the last album released during Raul Seixas' lifetime. The album, titled A Panela do Diabo, was released by Warner Music Brazil on August 19, 1989. On the morning of August 21, Raul Seixas was found dead in his bed, around eight o'clock in the morning, in his apartment in São Paulo, a victim of cardiac arrest: his alcoholism, aggravated by the fact that he was diabetic and had not taken insulin the previous night, caused him to suffer fulminant acute pancreatitis. The LP released two days prior, sold 150,000 copies, earning Raul a posthumous gold record, which was given to his family and also to Marcelo Nova, thus becoming one of the most successful albums of his career. Raul's wake was held at the Anhembi Convention Palace, amidst shouts, tears, and songs from fans who participated in the event. The following day, his body was flown to Salvador and buried in the Jardim da Saudade Cemetery.

== Legacy ==
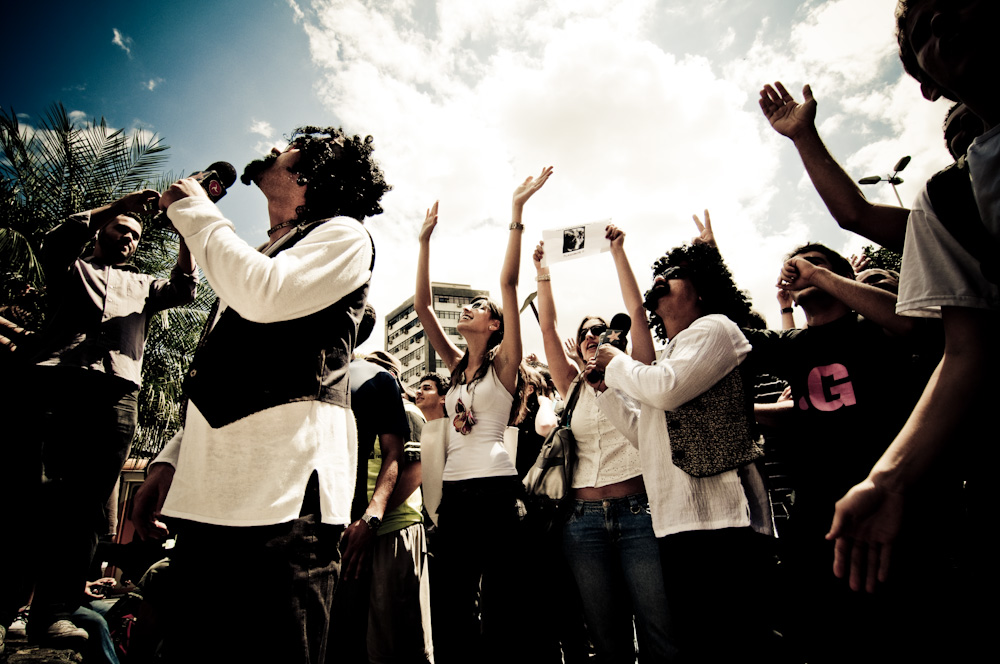
Festival in Belo Horizonte, held in 2009 in homage to Raul Seixas. Two participants are characterized according to Raul's physical appearance.

After his death, Raul remained among the hit charts. Several posthumous albums were produced, such as O Baú do Raul (1992), Raul Vivo (1993), Se o Rádio não Toca... (1994 ) and Documento (1998). Numerous compilations were also released, such as Os Grandes Sucessos de Raul Seixas (1993), the vast majority without new material, but some with unreleased songs such as As Profecias (with a live version of "Rock das 'Aranha'") from 1991 and Anarkilópolis (with "Cowboy Fora da Lei Nº 2") from 2003. In 2002, singer Zé Ramalho released the DVD Zé Ramalho Canta Raul Seixas: Ao Vivo, featuring some of Raul's songs in the repertoire. In 2004, the cable channel Multishow promoted a special tribute show to Raul, entitled O Baú do Raul: Uma Homenagem a Raul Seixas. The show, recorded at Fundição Progresso and released on CD and DVD, featured artists such as Toni Garrido, CPM 22, Marcelo D2, Gabriel o Pensador, Arnaldo Brandão, Raimundos, Maurício Baia, Nasi, Caetano Veloso, Pitty, and Marcelo Nova (the last three from Bahia, like Raul).

Even after his death, Raul Seixas continues to be successful among new generations. Twenty years after his death, music producer Marco Mazzola, a personal friend of Raul, released the previously unreleased song "Gospel", which had been censored in the 1970s. The song was included in the soundtrack of the Rede Globo telenovela, Viver a Vida. In 2013, American singer Bruce Springsteen performed "Sociedade Alternativa" at his concert at Espaço das Américas in São Paulo. In June 2014, Record TV chose the song "Tente outra vez" as the opening theme for the telenovela Vitória. In 2015, the record label Som Livre released the DVD and CD O Baú do Raul – 25 Anos Sem Raul Seixas, recorded in August 2014 at Fundição Progresso, the month that marked exactly 25 years since the singer's death. The DVD featured performances of his hits by Jerry Adriani, Nação Zumbi, Baía, Ana Cañas, Forfun, Zeca Baleiro, Marcelo Nova, Marcelo Jeneci, Digão, Tico Santa Cruz, Cachorro Grande, among others, as well as the musician's original band, Os Panteras. Since 2002, the name of one of his most famous songs, "Maluco Beleza", has been used to name a radio station in Campinas run by people with mental health issues and drug users, aimed at reintegrating them into society.

Seixas was also portrayed by Lucci Ferreira in the 2014 biographical drama film Paulo Coelho's Best Story. A biographical miniseries, called Raul Seixas: Let Me Sing, was produced by Globoplay to commemorate the artist's 80th birthday. After a two-year delay, it was finally released on June 26, 2025. Created, directed, and produced by Paulo Morelli, the series portrays the artist's journey, from his birth in Salvador to his consecration as one of the greatest national singers and composers.

== Discography ==
=== Studio albums ===
- Os 24 Maiores Sucessos da Era do Rock (1973) (Note: The record label Polyfar (a subsidiary of Phonogram Records) did not allow Raul to use his image on a cover album, fearing it would impact sales of his solo album Krig-ha, Bandolo!. Thus, Os 24 Maiores Sucessos da Era do Rock was credited to the fictional band Rock Generation until its re-release in 1975, when Raul Seixas began to be credited for his contributions to the production and vocals.)
- Krig-ha, Bandolo! (1973)
- Gita (1974)
- Novo Aeon (1975)
- Há 10 Mil Anos Atrás (1976)
- Raul Rock Seixas (1977)
- O Dia em que a Terra Parou (1977)
- Mata Virgem (1978)
- Por Quem os Sinos Dobram (1979)
- Abre-te Sésamo (1980)
- Raul Seixas (1983)
- Metrô Linha 743 (1984)
- Uah-Bap-Lu-Bap-Lah-Béin-Bum! (1987)
- A Pedra do Gênesis (1988)
- A Panela do Diabo (1989)

== Bibliography ==
- (1973). O Grito de Guerra, O Pasquim.
- (1987). Uah-bap-lu-bap-hab-béin-bum, Bizz.
- Almeida, Ricardo Porto de (1980). Aluga-se o Brasil: Tratar com Raul Seixas, Jornal Canja.
- Bahiana, Ana Maria (1975). Eu em Noites de Sol, "20 Anos de Rock", Release.
- Bahiana, Ana Maria (1975). O Aprendiz de Feiticeiro, o Demolidor, "A Glória", Revista Rock.
- Bahiana, Ana Maria (1983). Dez Mil Fãs Exaltados, O Globo.
- Caramey, Carlos (1975). Eu sou o meu país, Pop Hit Pop.
- Frans, Elton; Moura, Roberto Murcia (2000). Raul Seixas: a história que não foi contada, Irmãos Vitale. ISBN 85-7407-087-4. ISBN 978-85-7407-087-2
- Mauro, André (2007). O Último Anarquista, Martin Claret.
- Passos, Sylvio (organização e pesquisa; 2007). Raul Seixas por ele mesmo, Martin Claret. ISBN 85-7232-101-2
- Passos, Sylvio (2007). O tempo de Raul Seixas, Martin Claret.
- Passos, Sylvio (2007). Raul Seixas: os últimos anos, Martin Claret.
- Pereira, Fabiana Santos (?). Subjetividade Alternativa: O Discurso na Obra de Raul Seixas e Sua Representação pelo Jornalismo, Universidade Católica de Brasília.
- Reys, Aloysio (1976). Eu sou um artista, Jornal de Música.
- Sardenberg, Walterson (1982). Não pertenco a grupo nenhum, Revista Amiga.
- 1983 – As aventuras de Raul Seixas na Cidade de Thor – Raul Seixas – Shogun Arte, RJ
- 1992 – Raul Seixas, uma antologia – Sylvio Passos e Toninho Buda – Martin Claret Editores, SP
- 1992 – O Baú do Raul – Kika Seixas e Tárik de Sousa – Editora Globo, SP
- 1993 – Eu quero cantar por cantar – Ayrton Mugnaini Jr. – Nova Sampa Editora, SP
- 1993 – Raul Seixas e o Sonho da Sociedade Alternativa – Luciana Alves – Martin Claret Editores, SP
- 1994 – Raul Seixas, Musicalmente falando – Thais de Moraes – Nova Sampa Editora, SP
- 1994 – Raulseixismo – Costa Senna – Nova Sampa Editora, SP
- 1994 – Raul Seixas Forever – Madiel Figueiredo – Editora Ataniense, SP
- 1994 – Raul Seixas Rock Book – Kika Seixas – Griphus Editora, RJ
- 1995 – Raul Rock Seixas – Kika Seixas – Editora Globo, SP
- 1995 – Raul Seixas, o Metamorfônico – Issac Soares de Sousa – Gráfica e Editora Colleta, Bariri/SP
- 1995 – Trem das sete – Luciana Alves, Toninho Buda, Drago, Jairo Ferreira, Zelinda Hypólito, Ayrton Mugnaini Jr., Costa Senna – Nova Sampa Editora, SP
- 1995 – A trajetória de um ídolo – Thildo Gama – Pen Editora, SP
- 1997 – Raul Seixas, entrevistas e depoimentos – Thildo Gama – Pen Editora, SP
- 1999 – Triângulo do Diabo – Opus 666 – Jay Vaquer – Girl Press
- 1999 – A Paixão Segundo Raul Seixas – Toninho Buda – Editora Maya, SP
- 1999 – Dez Anos Sem Raul Seixas – Tiago Sotero de Sá & Mirella Franco Barrella – Produção Alternativa, SP
- 1999 – Luar aos Avessos – Angelo Sastre – Scortecci Editora, SP
- 1999 – Raul Seixas – Biografia – Coleção Gente do Século – Regina Echeverria – Editora Três, SP
- 2000 – Raul Seixas, a História que não foi contada – Elton Frans – Irmãos Vitale Editores, SP
- 2002 – Raul Seixas: A Verdade Absoluta – Filosofias, Políticas e Lutas – Mário Lucena – McBel Oficida de Letras, SP
- 2003 – Raul Seixas – Dez Mil anos à frente – Marco Haurélio – M2Mídia
- 2004 – Raul Seixas e a modernidade: Uma Viagem na contramão – Sonielson Juvino Silva – Marca de Fantasia, PB
- 2005 – Raul no Caldeirão – David E. Martins – Catedral das Letras, Petropolis/RJ
- 2005 – O Baú do Raul Revirado (Incluí CD com raridades) – Silvio Essinger – Ediouro, RJ
- 2007 – 30 Anos de Rock: Raul Seixas e a cultura brasileira – Dílson César Devides – Editora Corifeu, Rio de Janeiro/RJ
- 2007 – Vivendo A Sociedade Alternativa: Raul Seixas no seu tempo – Luiz Lima – Terceira Margem, São Paulo/SP
- 2008 – O Protesto dos Inconscientes – Raul Seixas e a Micropolítica – Juliana Abonizio – ECCO UFMT, Cuiabá/MT
- 2008 – Krig-ha, Bandolo! Cuidado, Aí Vem Raul Seixas! – Rosana da Câmara Teixeira – 7 Letras FAPERJ, Rio de Janeiro/RJ
- 2009 – Raul Seixas – Metamorfose Ambulante – Vida, alguma coisa acontece; Morte, alguma coisa pode acontecer – Mário Lucena, Laura Kohan e Igor Zinza – Coordenação: Sylvio Passos, B&A Editora, São Paulo/SP
- 2009 – O Baú do Raul Revirado (Audio Book/Audiolivro) – Org. Silvio Essinger, Narrado por Tico Santa Cruz e o grupo Voluntários da Pátria, com Nelson Motta, Kika e Vivian Seixas – PlugMe Editora, Rio de Janeiro/RJ
- 2010 – Novo Aeon – Raul Seixas no Torvelinho de seu tempo – Vitor Cei Santos – Editora Multifoco, Rio de Janeiro/RJ
- 2013 – "Lapis de genesi", in Alquimia o Arquimagistério Solar – Luis Carlos de Morais Junior – Editora Quártica Premium, Rio de Janeiro/RJ
