= Fundição Progresso =

Cultural venue in Rio de Janeiro, Brazil

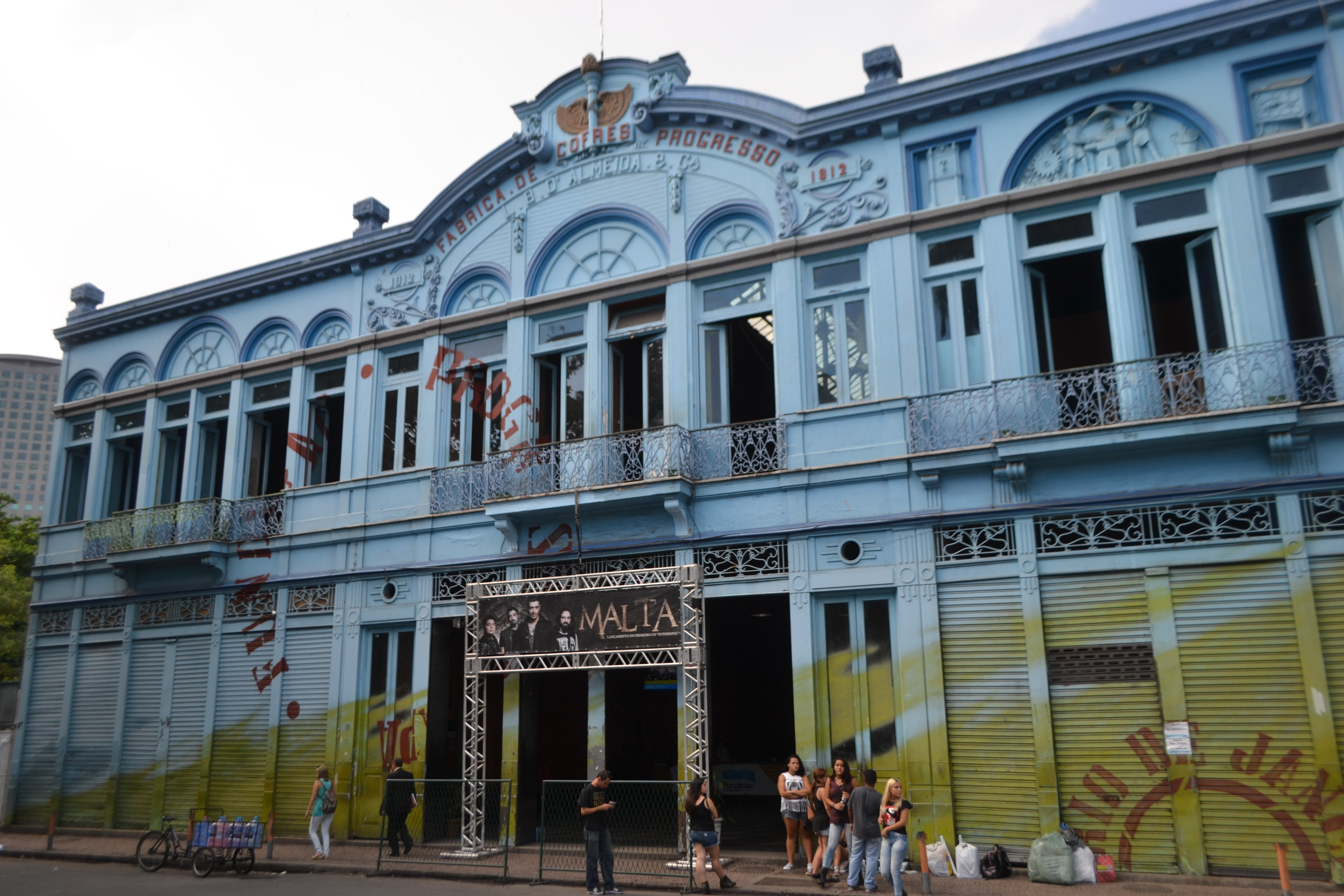
- Interactive map of Fundição Progresso
- Address: Rio de Janeiro; Brazil
- Coordinates: 22°54′44″S 43°10′50″W

Fundição Progresso (Portuguese: Progress Foundry) is a cultural center and music venue in the neighborhood of Lapa, in Rio de Janeiro, Brazil. It is located in the building of a former stove factory, Fábrica de Fogões Progresso.

Fundição Progresso is known for hosting live acts, for housing cultural workshops and for carrying out projects such as the Concurso Nacional de Marchinhas Carncavalescas (National Carnival Marchinhas Contest).

== History ==
Fundição Progresso building, located in the Historic Center of the city of Rio de Janeiro, is a historical heritage site, located on the site of the former Fábrica de Fogões Progresso (Progress Stove Factory) foundry, founded at the end of the 19th century and closed in 1976.

With the factory's closure, the building was left unoccupied and was going to be demolished, but, in 1982, a group of artists and producers occupied the building in order to prevent demolition and transform the place into a large cultural center. Then, the National Bank for Economic and Social Development funded the creation of the cultural center, which, since then, has been under different administrations.

== Venue and shows ==
The Fundição concert hall can accommodate approximately five thousand people.

Among the Brazilian acts, names such as Caetano Veloso, Cássia Eller, Lulu Santos, Lenine, Pitty, Luis Melodia, Nando Reis, Zeca Pagodinho, Jorge Ben Jor, and the bands O Rappa, Cidade Negra, Titãs, Os Paralamas do Sucesso, Natiruts and Los Hermanos performed at the venue. International artists and groups such as Marilyn Manson, Franz Ferdinand, Ziggy Marley, Slayer, Greta Van Fleet, Manu Chao, Motorhead, Australian Pink Floyd, Bob Sinclar, Israel Vibration, and Steel Pulse, Epica, Tarja Turunen and Andre Matos have also performed there. Fundição has also been the stage for the final samba contest of the Império Serrano samba school, for the 2012 carnival.
