= Secos & Molhados =

Brazilian Glam Rock Band

- Origin: São Paulo, Brazil
- Genres: Progressive rock; MPB; glam rock; folk rock
- Years active: 1971–1974; 1977–88; 1999; 2011–2012
- Labels: Continental (1973–74); Philips (1978–80); Polygram (1988); Eldorado (2000)
- Members: João Ricardo, Daniel Iasbeck
- Past members: Ney Matogrosso, Gérson Conrad
- Website: secosemolhados.com

Secos & Molhados (English: Dry Ones & Wet Ones) was a Brazilian band formed in 1971 and best known for their first two studio albums that helped launch singer Ney Matogrosso's career. The other two members were João Ricardo, founder and main songwriter of the group, and Gérson Conrad.

== History ==
The first line-up, consisting of João Ricardo, Gérson Conrad, and Ney Matogrosso, plus various musicians such as John Flavin (guitar), Willy Verdaguer (electric bass), Marcelo Frias (drums), Sergio Rosadas (flute), plus special participation of Zé Rodrix was short-lived - only two albums were released, one in 1973 and one in 1974, both self-titled. This line-up achieved success, appearing in several TV broadcasts, and remains highly influential today. Matogrosso's unusual high-pitched voice helped create a distinct identity as well as the band's eccentric heavy make-up and outfits (developed by Matogrosso himself, with influences ranging from Brazilian indigenous peoples to kabuki theater). In typical Tropicália fashion, Secos & Molhados's style was one marked by a broad fusion of genres, including glam rock, MPB, fado, and experimental music, among others. Most lyrics for both studio albums were adapted from the work of poets such as Manuel Bandeira and Vinicius de Moraes.

From 1974 onwards, the group remained active, with only João Ricardo as the only steady member. They have released several albums through the years. Their most recent release is an autobiographic album called "Chato-boy", featuring founding member João Ricardo with the addition of a new member - guitarist Daniel Iasbeck.

== Discography ==
- Secos & Molhados (1973)
- Secos & Molhados II (1974)
- Secos e Molhados III (1978)
- Secos e Molhados IV (1980)
- A Volta do Gato Preto (1988)
- Teatro? (1999)
- Memória Velha (2000)
- Ouvido Nu (2003)
- Puto (2007)
- Chato-Boy (2011)
