= Secos & Molhados (album) =

Studio album by Secos & Molhados
- Released: August 1973
- Recorded: Between May and June 1973
- Studio: Estúdios Prova, São Paulo
- Genre: MPB; vocal music; folk; progressive rock; glam rock; psychedelic pop
- Length: 30:54
- Label: LP: Continental; CD: Warner Music Brasil
- Producer: Moracy do Val

Secos & Molhados chronology
Secos & Molhados (1973)	Secos & Molhados [II] (1974)

Secos & Molhados (Brazilian Portuguese: [ˈsekuz i moˈʎadus]), also known as Secos & Molhados I, is the debut album of the group of the same name, released in August 1973. The album includes poetry works of authors such as Vinícius de Moraes, Manuel Bandeira and João Apolinário, and dances and songs from Portuguese folklore and Brazilian traditions. It features the most famous songs of the trio, such as "Sangue Latino", "O Vira", "Assim Assado" and "Rosa de Hiroshima". The album, as well as the band itself, emerged in the midst of a time of censorship and military dictatorship in Brazil, inspiring the band to portray themes such as freedom of expression, racism and war as a form of protest. It is the most famous LP of the Secos & Molhados group, selling more than 1 million copies throughout the country.

The album incorporated heavy rock, Brazilian popular music, glam rock (by using makeup on the album cover and in live shows, for instance) and developed genres in Brazil such as psychedelic pop and folk. Besides receiving platinum record certification in 1997 from ABPD for the re-release on CD, the fifth place on Rolling Stone Brasil's list of the 100 biggest records of Brazilian music in 2007 and the 97th place on the American magazine Al Borde's list "Los 250: Essential Albums of All Time Latin Alternative - Rock Iberoamericano".

== Track listing ==
Side one
No.	Title	Writer(s)	Length
1.	"Sangue Latino"	João Ricardo, Paulinho Mendonça	2:07
2.	"O Vira"	João Ricardo, Luhli	2:21
3.	"O Patrão Nosso de Cada Dia"	João Ricardo	3:19
4.	"Amor"	João Ricardo, João Apolinário	2:14
5.	"Primavera nos Dentes"	João Ricardo, João Apolinário	4:50

Side two
No.	Title	Writer(s)	Length
6.	"Assim Assado"	João Ricardo	2:58
7.	"Mulher Barriguda"	João Ricardo, Solano Trindade	2:35
8.	"El Rey"	Gérson Conrad, João Ricardo	0:58
9.	"Rosa de Hiroshima"	Gérson Conrad, Vinícius de Moraes	2:00
10.	"Prece Cósmica"	João Ricardo, Cassiano Ricardo	1:57
11.	"Rondó do Capitão"	João Ricardo, Manuel Bandeira	1:01
12.	"As Andorinhas"	João Ricardo, Cassiano Ricardo	0:58
13.	"Fala"	João Ricardo, Luhli	3:13
Total length:			30:22
