= Eldorado FM =

Brazilian radio station owned by Grupo Estado

Eldorado FM (ZYM 673)
- São Paulo; Brazil
- Broadcast area: São Paulo and the São Paulo metropolitan area, with spillover into adjacent areas
- Frequency: 107.9 MHz
- RDS: Yes
- Branding: A rádio dos melhores ouvintes

Programming
- Language: Portuguese

Ownership
- Owner: Francisco Mesquita Neto

History
- Founded: January 4, 1958; 68 years ago
- First air date: 1975
- Former frequencies: 92.9 MHz (1975–2011); 107.3 MHz (2011-26)

Technical information
- Licensing authority: ANATEL
- Class: E3
- ERP: 45.7 kW

Links
- Website: eldorado.estadao.com.br

Eldorado FM is a Brazilian radio station based in São Paulo that broadcast on the 107.9 MHz FM frequency. Founded in 1975 on the 92.9 MHz frequency, it was owned by Grupo Estado, the publisher of the newspaper O Estado de S. Paulo, in partnership with Porto Seguros, which operated its broadcast license. In May 2026, the station ceased operations and was replaced by Bandeirantes São Paulo, returning in 7 October 2026.

== History ==
=== Early years ===
Eldorado was founded on January 4, 1958, by Júlio de Mesquita Filho and Francisco Mesquita as an extension of the newspaper O Estado de S. Paulo Rádio Eldorado opened with a concert by pianist Magda Tagliaferro, still broadcasting on the AM frequency.

=== Arrival at FM ===
The station went on the air on October 1, 1975, on the 92.9 MHz frequency, coming on the air on FM broadcasting, becoming the second radio station owned by the newspaper O Estado de S. Paulo, which already operated Rádio Estadão. In its early years, its programming consisted of news broadcasts and classical music. Although they belonged to a major newspaper, both stations were run-down and left to fend for themselves (outdated management, unmotivated staff, equipment in terrible condition, etc.), a situation that only began to change in 1982 when João Lara Mesquita, one of the heirs of Estadão, took over management of the stations and implemented a major modernization effort, leading Eldorado FM to begin investing in Música popular brasileira, adult contemporary music, and alternative genres.

In 2011, it was announced that what was then Rádio Eldorado ESPN would begin broadcasting on FM, taking over Eldorado’s frequency and changing its name to Estadão ESPN. With this change, the station moved on March 20 to the 107.3 MHz frequency, where Rádio Brasil 2000, owned by the foundation of the same name, had been operating. Brasil 2000 transitioned to an internet radio station following the broadcast change and ceased operations in 2016 (Brasil 2000 had already been a partner of the radio station since 2009, rebroadcasting sports games). The Brasil 2000 Foundation also became a content partner of Eldorado.

In January 2017, Grupo Estado launched a voluntary separation plan at the Estadão and Eldorado radio stations. As reported by the website Comunique-se, the plan called for the number of radio station operators to be cut in half. In February of that same year, it began simulcasting programming with Rádio Estadão until the station ceased operations. Eldorado FM absorbed part of Estadão’s programming.

=== End of operations and return ===
On April 23, 2026, it was announced that the radio station would cease operations on May 14 of that same year, bringing to a close a cycle of nearly 70 years of existence (including the time as Rádio Eldorado AM), with the 107.3 FM frequency being sold to the Grupo Bandeirantes de Comunicação. According to Grupo Estado, the reason for its closure was the non-renewal of the partnership with Fundação Brasil 2000, combined with a lack of public interest in the station’s programming and a cost-cutting policy. As a result, some of the network’s programs, such as Som a Pino and Clube do Livro, will continue, but on other platforms, as will the Eldorado brand, which will now prioritize digital media.

Some of the station’s employees, as well as several journalists and artists, opposed the decision to shut down Eldorado FM, launching online petitions, organizing protests along Paulista Avenue, and even publishing editorials calling for the station to remain on the air and criticizing Grupo Estado’s decision. Some of the radio station's employees were laid off after the station went off the air.

The station went off the air at 11:56 p.m. on May 14, 2026, to the tune of Ryuichi Sakamoto’s Moving On. At midnight on May 15, 2026, Bandeirantes São Paulo went on the air at FM 107.3 MHz, announcing the new programming on the new frequency.

On September 10, 2026—four months after it had ceased operations—Rádio Eldorado FM announced the returnof its operations; this time, it would broadcast on the 107.9 MHz frequency, replacing Tropical FM. In this new phase, the station is sponsored by the company Porto, which opted not to exercise naming rights, thereby retaining the station's original name. The station returned to the airwaves at 8:05 PM on October 7, 2026, with a special live broadcast from Casa Natura Musical in the Pinheiros neighborhood. Immediately afterward, the station launched its new programming with the song "Moving On"—the very same track that had played last during the station's shutdown in May 2026.

== Audience perception ==
Its slogan was “the radio station for the best listeners", since 1997. It was known for having a discerning audience, standing out for attracting a highly educated, opinion-forming audience with high purchasing power and refined cultural interests, even though it had lower ratings among the general public. In 2012, the radio station held a poll among its listeners to choose the 30 greatest albums in Brazilian music, based on a list pre-selected by the station’s music team. The winning album was Ventura by the band Los Hermanos, released in 2003, which received more than 2,000 votes.

In February 2026, the broadcaster launched the campaign “It’s not an algorithm. It’s Eldorado,” which highlighted the importance of human curation in bringing new music and quality news to the public.

== Prominent professionals ==
Several well-known figures from Brazilian radio and journalism have worked at the station, including names such as, José Trajano, Thais Bilenky, Sarah Oliveira, Roberta Martinelli, Emanuel Bonfim, Wilson Simoninha, Caio Blinder, Sonia Racy, Jô Soares and José Luiz Tejon.
