= Xuxa discography =

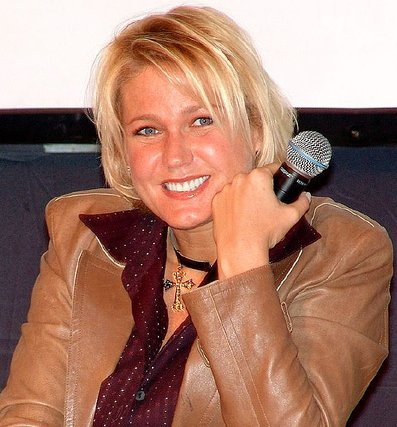
- Xuxa in 2005
- Studio albums: 28
- Soundtrack albums: 7
- Live albums: 3
- Compilation albums: 13
- Singles: 110
- Music videos: 220

This is the discography of Xuxa, a presenter, actress, singer and former model from Brazil. The singer has released twenty-eight studio albums, thirteen compilations, eight Spanish-language albums, over two hundred music videos and one hundred and ten singles. Xuxa became notorious after presenting the Clube da Criança program on the now defunct Rede Manchete network between 1984 and 1985, and soon after embarked on her first studio albums and soundtracks: Clube da Criança and Xuxa e Seus Amigos. However, it was with the albums of the Xou da Xuxa collection, which had significant sales that she achieved success.

Only with her first album in Som Livre, Xou da Xuxa released in July 1986, at the height of the Cruzado Plan, Xuxa reached the 2.700 million copies mark - surpassing all records released in Brazil that year, of the "phenomenon" RPM with Rádio Pirata ao Vivo, to king Roberto Carlos, becoming the largest seller in the country drives. Her third musical work, Xegundo Xou da Xuxa released in 1987 sold more than 3.200 million copies, surpassing sales in the previous album.

In 1988, Xuxa would reach impressive sales figures like no other Brazilian artist. Her fourth studio album Xou da Xuxa 3, launched on 30 June of that year, has established itself as the most significant album in sales in the Latin American market at the time, becoming the most successful album of her career, selling over 5,000,000 copies. Of the same album, came out one of the most known children's songs from Brazil, "Ilariê", which remained at No. 1 for 20 consecutive weeks in the Brazilian charts, was the most performed song on the radio along with Faz Parte do Meu Show, of the singer Cazuza, in his version in Spanish, the song reached the 11th position on the Billboard Latin Songs in 1989.

Xuxa became phenomenon also abroad, recording albums in Spanish for the Latin American market. Her first international job was with Xuxa 1, album released at the end of 1989 in Latin America and later in countries such as the United States, Spain and Portugal. The album reached the milestone of 300,000 copies sold, and reached the 4th position on the Billboard Latin Pop Albums. With Xuxa 2, the singer hit the mark three singles on the Billboard Hot Latin Songs with "Loquita Por Tí", "Luna de Cristal" and "Chindolele", the best placed of all, reaching the 10th position and remaining 14 weeks followed in the chart. In 1992, with the single "Sensación de Vivir" from album Xuxa 3, the singer debut first in the Top 10 of the most played songs of Spain. In Latin America, which Cosa Buena from the same album, positioned in 30th place on the Billboard Hot Latin Tracks chart. In Latin America, Que Cosa Buena from the same album, came to reach 30th on the Billboard Hot Latin Tracks.

In tours in Brazil and other countries, Xuxa hit attendance records at shows in cities such as Rio de Janeiro, with about 200,000 people (Maracanã Stadium - 1998), São Paulo with 300 thousand people (1997), Fortaleza over 60,000 people (Arena Castelão - 1996) and 100,000 people in Buenos Aires in Argentina (Velez Sarsfield Stadium - 1991).

Xuxa entered four times in the list of the best selling of all time Brazil albums, occupying the positions number 2, 5, 6 and 8 ranking. Also, is among the "50 women who sold more albums in music history", and the Brazilian artist who sold more albums abroad. It is also recognized as artist who sold more albums by Som Livre label.

In 2000, Xuxa só para Baixinhos series becomes an icon in the Brazilian children's market. With twelve editions, plus three DVDs with records shows four boxes of options with collections, the audiovisual occupies the list of best-selling DVDs in the country, the series has racked up sales of nine million copies. Creator and producer of the project, Xuxa was a precursor to launch the first XSPB. The big gamble paid off, and the album became a huge success, generating annual releases, with varied themes and participations by renowned guests on Brazilian music. The public recognition came with the approval of criticism. Nominated for Latin Grammy Award for Best Latin Children's Album five times, Xuxa brought two statues home.

In 2009, Xuxa broke her contract with Som Livre label and signed with Sony Music. By Sony launched their last four albums, Natal Mágico (2009) and Baixinhos, Bichinhos e Mais (2010). The Sustentabilidade album released in 2011, was her first DVD with 3D technology, and cost $1 million to the coffers of Sony Music. Her last work in label, was with the twelfth edition of XSPB, É Pra Dançar, released in June 2013.

In 2014, after five years at Sony Music, the singer returns the cast of Som Livre.

== Albums ==
=== Studio albums ===
Studio albums list, with leading positions, sales and certifications
Title	Information	Position	Sales	Certifications
Title	Information	BRA	Sales	Certifications
Xuxa e Seus Amigos	Release: 1985; Record Label: PolyGram; Format: LP, cassette tape	—	BRA: 500.000	BRA: 2× Platinum
Xou da Xuxa	Release: 30 July 1986; Record Label: Som Livre; Format: LP, cassette tape	1	BRA: 2.700.000	BRA: 2× Diamond
Xegundo Xou da Xuxa	Release: 23 June 1987; Record Label: Som Livre; Format: LP, cassette tape	1	BRA: 3.200.000	BRA: 2× Diamond
Xou da Xuxa 3	Release: 30 June 1988; Record Label: Som Livre; Format: LP, cassette tape	1	BRA: 5.000.000	BRA: 3× Diamond
4º Xou da Xuxa	Release: 11 July 1989; Record Label: Som Livre; Format: LP, cassette tape	1	BRA: 3.000.000	BRA: 2× Diamond
Xuxa 5	Release: 16 July 1990; Record Label: Som Livre; Format: LP, cassette tape	1	BRA: 1.000.000	BRA: Diamond
Xou da Xuxa Seis	Release: July 1991; Record Label: Som Livre; Format: LP, cassette tape	1	BRA: 1.000.000	BRA: Diamond
Xou da Xuxa Sete	Release: October 1992; Record Label: Som Livre; Format: LP, cassette tape	1	BRA: 640.000	BRA: Diamond
Xuxa	Release: 1993; Record Label: Som Livre; Format: LP, cassette tape, CD	—	BRA: 176.800	BRA: 2× Platinum
Sexto Sentido	Release: 1994; Record Label: Som Livre; Format: LP, cassette tape, CD	1	BRA: 1.000.000	BRA: Diamond
Luz no Meu Caminho	Release: 1995; Record Label: Som Livre; Format: LP, cassette tape, CD	—	BRA: 800,000	BRA: Diamond
Tô de Bem com a Vida	Release: September 1996; Record Label: Som Livre; Format: LP, cassette tape, CD	—	BRA: 700.000	BRA: Platinum
Boas Notícias	Release: 1997; Record Label: Som Livre; Format: LP, cassette tape, CD	—	BRA: 500.000	BRA: Platinum
Só Faltava Você	Release: 1998; Record Label: Som Livre; Format: CD	—	BRA: 100.000	BRA: Gold
Xuxa 2000	Release: 1999; Record Label: Som Livre; Format: CD	—	BRA: 50.000	
Só Para Baixinhos	Release: 5 October 2000; Record Label: Som Livre; Format: CD, DVD	—	BRA: 400.000	BRA: Platinum
Só Para Baixinhos 2	Release: 5 September 2001; Record Label: Som Livre; Format: CD, DVD	2	BRA: 750.000	BRA: 2× Platinum
Só Para Baixinhos 3: Country	Release: 31 August 2002; Record Label: Som Livre; Format: CD, DVD	1	BRA: 1.000.000	BRA: Diamond
Só Para Baixinhos 4: Praia	Release: 25 July 2003; Record Label: Som Livre; Format: CD, DVD	3	BRA: 1.000.000	BRA: Diamond
Só Para Baixinhos 5: Circo	Release: 26 September 2004; Record Label: Som Livre; Format: CD, DVD	5	BRA: 500.000	BRA: Platinum
Só Para Baixinhos 6: Festa	Release: 9 December 2005; Record Label: Som Livre; Format: CD, DVD	3	BRA: 500.000	BRA: Platinum
Só Para Baixinhos 7: Brincadeiras	Release: 7 July 2007; Record Label: Som Livre; Format: CD, DVD	8	BRA: 150.000	BRA: Gold
Só Para Baixinhos 8: Escola	Release: 13 September 2008; Record Label: Som Livre; Format: CD, DVD	7	BRA: 370.000	BRA: 2× Platinum
Só Para Baixinhos 9: Natal Mágico	Release: 5 October 2009; Record Label: Sony Music; Format: CD, DVD	10	BRA: 100.000	BRA: Gold
Só Para Baixinhos 10: Baixinhos, Bichinhos e Mais	Release: 29 August 2010; Record Label: Sony Music; Format: CD, DVD	—	BRA: 150.000	BRA: Gold
Só Para Baixinhos 11: Sustentabilidade	Release: 18 September 2011; Record Label: Sony Music; Format: CD, DVD	9	BRA: 200.000	BRA: 2× Platinum
Só Para Baixinhos 12: É Para Dançar	Release: 29 June 2013; Record Label: Sony Music; Format: CD, DVD	9	BRA: 50.000	BRA: Platinum
Só Para Baixinhos 13: ABC do XSPB	Release: 16 December 2016; Record Label: Som Livre; Format: CD, DVD			
Raridades X	Release: 24 September 2024; Record label: Som Livre; Format: CD			

=== International albums ===
List of international albums, with leading positions, sales and certifications
Title	Information	Position	Sales	Certifications
Title	Information	U.S. Latin Pop	Sales	Certifications
Xuxa 1	Release: 1990; Record Label: BMG, Som Livre, Globo Records; Format: LP, cassette tape	4	ARG: 60.000; CHI: 200.000	ARG: Platinum; CHI: 8× Platinum
Xuxa 2	Release: 1991; Record Label: BMG, Som Livre, Globo Records; Format: LP, cassette tape	7	ARG: 350.000	
Xuxa 3	Release: 1992; Record Label: BMG, Som Livre, Globo Records; Format: LP, cassette tape	—		
Todos sús Éxitos	Release: 1993; Record Label: BMG, RCA Victor; Format: LP, cassette tape, CD	—	ARG: 200.000	ARG: 2× Platinum
El Pequeño Mundo	Release: 1994; Record Label: PolyGram; Format: LP, cassette tape, CD	—	ARG: 120.000	ARG: 3× Platinum
Xuxa Dance	Release: November 1997; Record Label: PolyGram; Format: cassette tape, CD	—	ARG: 120.000	ARG: 2× Platinum
El Mundo és de los Dos	Release: 1999; Record Label: Universal Music; Format: cassette tape, CD	—		
Solamente para Bajitos	Release: 2005; Record Label: Sony Music Entertainment; Format: CD, DVD	—	ARG: 40.000	ARG: Platinum
"—" denotes releases that did not qualify or were not released in that territory.

=== Compilations ===
Lista de trilhas sonoras, com vendas e certificações
Título	Informações	Vendas	Certifications
Clube da Criança	Release: 1984; Record Label: RCA Victor; Format: LP, cassette tape	BRA: 350.000	BRA: Platinum
Karaokê da Xuxa	Release: 1987; Record Label: Globo Discos; Format: LP, cassette tape	BRA: 1.500.000	BRA: 2× Platinum
Carnaval dos Baixinhos	Release: 1988; Record Label: RGE, Xuxa Discos; Format: LP	BRA: 250.000	BRA: Platinum
Paradão dos Baixinhos	Release: 1989; Record Label: RGE, Xuxa Discos; Format: LP		
Lambaixinhos	Release: 1990; Record Label: RGE, Xuxa Discos; Format: LP	BRA: 100.000	BRA: Gold
Baby Mania	Release: 1992; Record Label: RGE, Xuxa Discos; Format: LP	BRA: 100.000	BRA: Gold
Xuxa 10 Anos	Release: June 1996; Record Label: Som Livre; Format: CD, cassette tape	BRA: 500.000	BRA: Platinum
Arraiá da Xuxa	Release: 1997; Record Label: Som Livre; Format: CD, cassette tape, CD	BRA: 250.000	
Pérolas: Xuxa	Release: 2000; Record Label: Som Livre; Format: CD		
Xuxa 20 Anos	Release: 2006; Record Label: Som Livre; Format: CD; BRA: 500.000		
Coleção Xou da Xuxa	Release: June 2013; Record Label: Som Livre; Format: CD, DVD		

=== Soundtracks ===
Lista de trilhas sonoras, com vendas e certificações
title	information	Sales	Certifications
Super Xuxa Contra Baixo Astral	Release: 1988; Record Label: Som Livre; Format: LP, cassette tape	BRA: 100.000	BRA: Gold
Lua de Cristal	Release: 1990; Record Label: Som Livre; Format: LP	BRA: 57.000	
Xuxa Requebra	Release: 1999; Record Label: Som Livre; Format: CD, cassette tape	BRA: 80.000	BRA: Gold
Xuxa e os Duendes	Release: 2001; Record Label: Som Livre; Format: CD	BRA: 376.000	BRA: 2x Platina
Xuxa e os Duendes 2: No Caminho das Fadas	Release: 2003; Record Label: Som Livre; Format: CD	BRA: 543.000	BRA: 2x Platina
Xuxinha e Guto Contra os Montros do Espaço	Release: 2005; Record Label: Som Livre; Format: CD	BRA: 32.000	BRA: Platinum

== Singles ==
=== National singles ===
Year	Single	Album
1984	"Lápis De Cor"	Clube da Criança
1985	"O Caderno"	Xuxa e Seus Amigos
1985	"O Leãozinho"	Xuxa e Seus Amigos
1985	"Sete Quedas"	Xuxa e Seus Amigos
1986	"Doce Mel (Bom Estar Com Você)"	Xou da Xuxa
1986	"Amiguinha Xuxa"	Xou da Xuxa
1986	"She-Rá"	Xou da Xuxa
1986	"Turma da Xuxa"	Xou da Xuxa
1986	"Quem Qué Pão?"	Xou da Xuxa
1986	"Meu Cãozinho Xuxo"	Xou da Xuxa
1987	"Festa do Estica e Puxa"	Xegundo Xou da Xuxa
1987	"Parabéns da Xuxa"	Xegundo Xou da Xuxa
1987	"Beijinho Beijinho (Tchau, Tchau)"	Karaôke da Xuxa
1987	"Estrela-Guia"	Karaôke da Xuxa
1987	"Quem Quiser Que Conte Outra"	Xegundo Xou Da Xuxa
1988	"Ilariê"	Xou da Xuxa 3
1988	"Arco-Íris"	Xou da Xuxa 3
1988	"Alto Astral"	Super Xuxa Contra Baixo Astral
1988	"Brincar de Índio"	Xou da Xuxa 3
1988	"Dança da Xuxa"	Xou da Xuxa 3
1988	"Abecedário da Xuxa"	Xou da Xuxa 3
1988	"Bombom"	Xou da Xuxa 3
1989	"Tindolelê"	4º Xou da Xuxa
1989	"Milagre da Vida"'	4º Xou da Xuxa
1989	"Remelexuxa"	4º Xou da Xuxa
1989	"Vem Dançar Comigo"	4º Xou da Xuxa
1989	"Bobeou Dançou"	4º Xou da Xuxa
1990	"Pinel Por Você"	Xuxa 5
1990	"Lua de Cristal"	Xuxa 5
1990	"Vem Lambaxuxa"	Xuxa 5
1990	"Tempero da Lambada"	Xuxa 5
1991	"Hoje É Dia de Folia"	Xou da Xuxa Seis
1991	"O Xou da Xuxa Começou"	Xou da Xuxa Seis
1991	"Dança Do Côco"	Xou da Xuxa Seis
1991	"Novo Planeta"	Xou da Xuxa Seis
1991	"Planeta Terra"	Xou da Xuxa Seis
1992	"Marquei Um X"	Xou da Xuxa Sete
1992	"A Vida é Uma Festa"	Xou da Xuxa Sete
1992	"Nosso Canto de Paz"	Xou da Xuxa Sete
1992	"Sorriso No Rosto"	Xou da Xuxa Sete
1993	"Espelho Meu"	Xuxa
1993	"Corrente de Amor"	Xuxa
1993	"Querer é Poder" (feat. José Augusto)	"Sonho Meu - Soundtrack"
1994	"Hey DJ"	Sexto Sentido
1994	"É De Chocolate"	Sexto Sentido
1994	"Jogo da Rima"	Sexto Sentido
1994	"Pipoca"	Sexto Sentido
1994	"Grito de Guerra"	Sexto Sentido
1995	"Brasileira"	Luz do Meu Caminho
1995	"Xuxa Hit's"	Luz do Meu Caminho
1995	"Ritmos"	Luz do Meu Caminho
1995	"Salada Mista"	Luz do Meu Caminho
1996	"Valeu"	Xuxa 10 Anos
1996	"Tô de Bem Com a Vida"	Tô de Bem Com a Vida
1996	"Xuxaxé"	Tô de Bem Com a Vida
1996	"Huppa-Hule"	Tô de Bem Com a Vida
1997	"Quadrilha Brasileira"	Arraiá da Xuxa
1997	"Festa do Interior"	Arraiá da Xuxa
1997	"Xuxalelê"	Boas Notícias
1997	"Serenata do Grilo"	Boas Notícias
1997	"Amarelinha"	Boas Notícias
1997	"Libera Geral"	Boas Notícias
1997	"Planeta Xuxa"	Boas Notícias
1998	"Eu Tô Feliz"	Só Faltava Você
1998	"Pelotão da Xuxa"	Só Faltava Você
1999	"Profecias"	Xuxa 2000
1999	"Só O Nosso Amor"	Xuxa 2000
1999	"Pagoxu"	Xuxa 2000
1999	"Efeito Dominó"	Xuxa 2000
1999	"Giro do Planeta"	Xuxa 2000
1999	"Vira, Vira"	Xuxa 2000
1999	"Profecias (Fim do Mundo)"	Vila Madalena - Soundtrack
2000	"Batatinha Bem Quentinha"	Só Para Baixinhos 1
2000	"Cinco Patinhos"	Só Para Baixinhos 1
2000	"Cabeça, Ombro, Joelho e Pé"	Só Para Baixinhos 1
2001	"Dançando com o Txutxucão "	Só Para Baixinhos 2
2001	"O Ônibus"	Só Para Baixinhos 2
2002	"Vamos Brincar"	Só Para Baixinhos 3
2002	"Bumbum, Como é Bom Ser Lelé"	Só Para Baixinhos 3
2002	"Imitando Os Animais"	Só Para Baixinhos 3
2003	"Estátua"	Só Para Baixinhos 4
2003	"Hula-Hula da Xuxinha"	Só Para Baixinhos 4
2003	"Taba Naba"	Só Para Baixinhos 4
2003	"Skinimarinki"	Só Para Baixinhos 4
2003	"Nadando Com o Teddy"	Só Para Baixinhos 4
2003	"Sr. Batedecábatedelá"	Só Para Baixinhos 4
2004	"O Circo Já Chegou"	Só Para Baixinhos 5 - Circo
2004	"Piruetas"	Só Para Baixinhos 5 - Circo
2004	"Soco, Bate, Vira"	Só Para Baixinhos 5 - Circo
2005	"Bombando Brinque"	Só Para Baixinhos 6 - Festa
2005	"Dança da Xuxa" (feat. DJ Malboro)	Só Para Baixinhos 6 - Festa
2005	"Festa"	Só Para Baixinhos 6 - Festa
2007	"Pique Alto"	Só Para Baixinhos 7 - Brincadeiras
2007	"Dança da Cadeira"	Só Para Baixinhos 7 - Brincadeiras
2007	"Bambolê"	Só Para Baixinhos 7 - Brincadeiras
2008	"XSPB no Ar"	Só Para Baixinhos 8 - Escola
2008	"Tumbalacatumba"	Só Para Baixinhos 8 - Escola
2008	"Olha a Música"	Só Para Baixinhos 8 - Escola
2008	"Sono"	Veveta e Saulinho - A Casa Amarela
2009	"Você Acredita em Mágica?"	Só Para Baixinhos 9 - Natal Mágico
2009	"Vem Chegando o Natal"	Só Para Baixinhos 9 - Natal Mágico
2009	"Papai Noel Existe"	Só Para Baixinhos 9 - Natal Mágico
2010	"Peito, Estala, Bate"	Só Para Baixinhos 10 - Baixinhos, Bichinhos e Mais
2010	"Choco Chocolate"	Só Para Baixinhos 10 - Baixinhos, Bichinhos e Mais
2010	"A Dança do Pinguim"	Só Para Baixinhos 10 - Baixinhos, Bichinhos e Mais
2011	"Além das Estrelas"	Só Para Baixinhos 11 - Sustentabilidade
2011	"Um Novo Lugar"	Só Para Baixinhos 11 - Sustentabilidade
2011	"Garota de Ipanema" (feat. Daniel Jobim)	Aquele Beijo - Soundtrack
2013	"Eu Quero Festa"	Só Para Baixinhos 12 - É Pra Dançar
2013	"Mais amor"	Coleção Xou da Xuxa

=== International singles ===
Single	Ano	Posição		Álbum
Single	Ano	EUA Latin	EU 100	Álbum
"Bombón"	1990	—	—	Xuxa 1
"Danza de Xuxa"	1990	—	—	Xuxa 1
"Arco Iris"	1990	—	—	Xuxa 1
"Ilarié"	1990	11	—	Xuxa 1
"Juguemos a los Índios"	1990	—	—	Xuxa 1
"Luna de Cristal"	1991	35	—	Xuxa 2
"Chindolele"	1991	10	—	Xuxa 2
"Nuestro Canto de Paz"	1991	—	—	Xuxa 2
"Loquita Por Tí"	1992	29	—	Xuxa 2
"Que Cosa Buena"	1993	30	—	Xuxa 3
"El Xou de Xuxa Comenzó"	1993	—	—	Xuxa 3
"Sensación de Vivir"	1993	—	64	Xuxa 3
"Querido Professor"	1997	—	—	Xuxa Dance
"Los Amigos de Mis Amigas Son Mis Amigos"	1997	—	—	Xuxa Dance
"Te Doy Mi Corazón"	1997	—	—	Xuxa Dance

== Videography ==
=== Video albums ===
List of video albums, with information and notes
Title	Information	Note
Xou da Xuxa: O Vídeocaxete da Xuxa	Release: 1987; Record Label: Globo Vídeo; Format: VHS	Video showing the highlights of the first year of the Xou da Xuxa.
Xou da Xuxa 2	Release: 1990; Record Label: Globo Vídeo; Format: VHS	Video showing the best moments of the second, third and fourth year of Xou da Xuxa.
Momentos Especiais	Release: 1992; Record Label: Globo Vídeo; Format: VHS	Video showing the best moments from the fifth to seventh and final year of the Xou da Xuxa.
Sexto Sentido: O Xou	Release: May 1996; Record Label: Globo Vídeo; Format: VHS	Video which contain the presentations of tour Sexto Sentido in several cities in Brazil.
Xuxa só para Baixinhos	Release: 2000–16; Record Label: Som Livre, Sony Music; Format: VHS, DVD	Series on CDs, DVDs and Blu-ray. Currently, the series has thirteen volumes, with nine released by Som Livre and four, released by Sony Music.
Xuxa 20 Anos	Release: 2006; Record Label: Som Livre; Format: DVD	Video containing special broadcast on Rede Globo in commemoration of the twenty years of the presenter at the network, on 14 October 2006.
