= Xuxa (album) =

Studio album by Xuxa
- Released: 1993
- Recorded: 1993
- Genre: Pop; children's music
- Length: 41:50
- Label: Som Livre
- Producer: Michael Sullivan; Paulo Massadas

Xuxa chronology
Xou da Xuxa Sete (1992)	Xuxa (1993)	Sexto Sentido (1994)

Singles from Xuxa
- 1. "Espelho Meu" Released: 1993; 2. "Corrente do Amor" Released: 1993; 3. "Terra e Coração" Released: 1993; 4. "Tô ai" Released: 1993

Xuxa was the twelfth studio album by Brazilian recording artist Xuxa Meneghel. It was released in July 1993 by Som Livre. The album is composed only of songs that were left out of their previous albums.

Sales were positive, despite being a collection of b-sides. The arrangements of the album's tracks were redone in some songs.

== Production and songs ==
In 1993, Xuxa began to devote itself more and more to its international programs. In the same year, began to present a Sunday program that took its name in the afternoons of Rede Globo, this time directed towards the whole family. As a way to not fail to release an album that year, it was decided to make an album with music files, which the public still did not know, as well as songs recorded for the singer's specials.

As a more effective way to fill out the album, most of the songs included were recorded for the last two albums released: Xou da Xuxa and Xou da Xuxa Seis. From the sixth album of the series, the songs: "Corrente do Amor", "Tô aí" and "Direitos Dos Baixinhos", which had initially been recorded for Xuxa 5, were discarded.

The songs "Brincando com o Tempo", "Terra e Coração", "Maçã do Amor" and "Espelho Meu" were recorded for the Xou da Xuxa Sete. In addition, "Espelho Meu" won a Spanish version that served as the opening theme of the El Show de Xuxa in 1992. "Terra e Coração" also won a version, in addition to having its original version performed at the opening of the tours Xuxa 92 and Sexto Sentido.

From the 4th Xou da Xuxa, we have the song "Terra Prometida". A duet recorded with Amanda member of the Trem da Alegria. The song that was replaced by "Recado para Xuxa" in 4th Xou da Xuxa, won a music video in the Christmas special of 1989. A thousand times thousand was recorded specially for the 1000 edition of Xou da Xuxa. Boy God is the only song that is not known for which album was recorded.

A photographic test was not performed for the album cover. The photos used in the album art were made for the release of the Xuxa program in the United States. The same photos chosen for this album were also used as cover and back cover for the compilation Todos sus Êxitos, released only abroad. The album was produced by Michael Sullivan and Paulo Massadas.

== Release and reception ==
Xuxa "was released in July 1993 in CD, cassette and LP formats. The album was reissued on CD in 1996, 2001, 2006 and 2008. The album sold 176,830.

== Promotion ==
As an album made just to "cover absence", the promotion was minimal and was limited to just a few performances of "Corrente do Amor" in the Xuxa program and the commercials shown in Rede Globo programming in 10 and 30 second versions.

== Track listing ==
Xuxa – LP, Cassette and CD edition
No.	Title	Writer(s)	Length
1.	"Corrente do Amor"	Sergio Fonseca; Marcos Netto; César Costa Filho; Carlinhos Piteira	4:10
2.	"Tô aí (So do ti)"	R. Ulyate; Versão: Michael Sullivan; Paulo Massadas	4:28
3.	"Brincando com o Tempo"	Júnior Mendes; Lincoln Olivetti; Angel	3:10
4.	"Terra Prometida" (com Amanda)	Paulo Massadas; Michael Sullivan	5:00
5.	"Menino Deus"	Rubens Alexandre; Elita Massadas	4:17
6.	"Direitos Dos Baixinhos"	Paulo Sergio Valle; Chico Roque	3:20
7.	"Terra e Coração"	Cláudio Matta; Álvaro Socci	4:03
8.	"Maçã do Amor"	Paulo Massadas; Michael Sullivan	4:35
9.	"Espelho Meu"	Paulo Massadas; Michael Sullivan	3:58
10.	"Mil Vezes Mil"	Paulo Massadas; Michael Sullivan	4:15
Total length:			41:50

Bonus Track – CD re-release
No.	Title	Writer(s)	Length
11.	"Tindolelê"	Cid Guerreiro; Dito	5:01
12.	"Ilariê"	Cid Guerreiro; Dito; Ceinha	5:33
13.	"Hoje é Dia de Folia"	Dido Oliveira	3:58
14.	"Pinel Por Você"	Cid Guerreiro; Dito	5:33

== Personnel ==
- Produced: Michael Sullivan, Paulo Massadas and Max Pierre
- Art Direction: Aramis Barros
- Artistic Coordination: Marlene Mattos and Xuxa Meneghel
- Recording Technician: Jorge 'Gordo' Guimarães, Luiz G. D 'Orey, Antonio' Moog 'Canazio, Luiz Paulo, Edu and Jorge' Garr
- Mastering: Digital Vison
- Recording and mixing: Marcelo Serodio, Julio Carneiro, Mauro Moraes, Ivan, Claudinho, Julio Martins, Everaldo and Sergi
- Recorded in the studios: Free Sound, Live Voice, Olivetti Cave and Lincoln
- Mixing: Free Sound - Rio de Janeiro
- Mixing Technicians: Jorge 'Gordo' Guimarães and Luiz G. D 'Orey

== Certifications ==
Certifications for "Xuxa"
Region	Certification	Certified units/sales
Brazil (Pro-Música Brasil)	Gold	100,000^{‡}
^{‡} Sales+streaming figures based on certification alone.
