= Xuxa 10 Anos =

Compilation album by Xuxa
- Released: June 1996
- Genre: Pop; Children's music
- Label: Som Livre
- Producer: Michael Sullivan

Xuxa 10 Anos is a commemorative album by Brazilian singer Xuxa Meneghel. It was released in several formats in 1996: CD, cassette tape and LP. Sold 500,000 copies and was 3× platinum. In addition to the album, a special program was shown by TV Globo in June 1996.

The "Xuxa 10 Anos" is an album commemorating the 10 years of Xuxa in Rede Globo, with 10 of its greatest hits, with 5 of them winning remixed versions. The album was re-released on CD in 2005, 2006 and 2008 by Som Livre.

== Promotion ==
The album was widely released by Xuxa on the TV shows Xuxa Park and Xuxa Hits (that in the following year happened to be called Planeta Xuxa), and was also widely publicized on the Sexto Sentido and Tô de Bem com a Vida tours.

== Track listing ==
1. Valeu (10 Anos de Amor)
2. Tindolelê (Memê's Rádio Mix)
3. Dança da Xuxa (Mello's Dance Rádio Mix)
4. Brincar de Índio (Dance Mix)
5. Jogo da Rima (Memê's Super Dance Mix)
6. Nosso Canto de Paz (Mello's Rádio Remix)
7. Dez Anos
8. Ilariê
9. Doce Mel (Bom Estar com Você)
10. Arco-Íris
11. Lua de Cristal
12. Festa do Estica e Puxa
13. Vamos Comemorar
