= Xuxa 3 =

Studio album by Xuxa
- Released: October 2, 1992
- Recorded: between May and September 1992
- Genre: Latin pop; children's music
- Length: 58:30
- Label: RCA Records; BMG; Globo Records
- Producer: Michael Sullivan; Paulo Massadas; Max Pierre

Xuxa chronology
Xuxa 2 (1991)	Xuxa 3 (1992)	Todos sús Éxitos (1993)

Singles from Xuxa 3
- 1. "Sensación de Vivir" Released: 1992; 2. "Hoy es Día de Alegría" Released: 1992; 3. "Que Cosa Buena" Released: 1993; 4. "Nuestro Canto de Paz" Released: 1993

Xuxa 3 is the tenth studio album and the third in Spanish language by Brazilian recording artist Xuxa. It was released on October 2, 1992, in Latin America, United States and Europe.

== Background ==
In 1991, El Show de Xuxa entered the air on Telefe, Argentina's largest television network, establishing once artistic career Xuxa. It was shown in more than 17 countries in Latin America and the US Hispanic market, in addition to Spain.

== Production ==
Xuxa 3 was produced by Michael Sullivan, Paulo Massadas and Max Pierre, with artistic coordination of Max Pierre and Marlene Mattos. The repertoire selection came under command Xuxa, Marlene Mattos, Michael Sullivan and Paul Massadas. Xuxa 3 was recorded in the studios of Som Livre, Viva Voz, Lincoln Olivetti, Yahoo, Roupa Nova e Caverna II.

== Release ==
Xuxa 3 was launched in Latin America in October 1992. Then Spain and the United States, and in early 1993 in Canada.

== Track list ==
Side one
No.	Title	Writer(s)	Length
1.	"El Show de Xuxa Comenzó"	Nando Cordel	4:16
2.	"Nuestro Canto de Paz"	Nando Cordel	4:05
3.	"La Pulga"	Reinaldo Waisman; Afo Verde; Pablo Durand	3:02
4.	"Que Cosa Buena"	Lincoln Olivetti; Claudio Olivetti	4:14
5.	"Quien Sabe un Día"	Torcuato Mariano; Claudio Rabello	4:05
6.	"Vivir"	Neuma Morais; Neon Morais	5:01
Total length:			24:35

Side two
No.	Title	Writer(s)	Length
1.	"Hoy es Día de Alegría"	Nando Cordel	4:10
2.	"La Vida es Una Fiesta"	Michael Sullivan; Paulo Massadas	3:55
3.	"La Tribu Del Amor"	Augusto Cesar; Carlos Colla	4:42
4.	"La Danza Del Coco"	Augusto Cezar; Carlos Colla	3:17
5.	"Una Equis en tu Corazón"	Sarah P. Benchimol; Fafy Siqueira	3:36
6.	"América Total"	Marcos Valle; Claudio Rabello; Max Pierre	5:54
Total length:			24:28

Xuxa 3 – CD edition
No.	Title	Writer(s)	Length
1.	"El Show de Xuxa Comenzó"	Nando Cordel	4:16
2.	"Nuestro Canto de Paz"	Nando Cordel	4:05
3.	"La Pulga"	Reinaldo Waisman; Afo Verde; Pablo Durand	3:02
4.	"Que Cosa Buena"	Lincoln Olivetti; Claudio Olivetti	4:14
5.	"Quien Sabe un Día"	Torcuato Mariano; Claudio Rabello	4:05
6.	"Sensación de Vivir"	Davis; José Luiz Tierno	3:48
7.	"Vivir"	Neuma Morais; Neon Morais	5:01
8.	"Hoy es Día de Alegría"	Nando Cordel	4:10
9.	"La Vida es Una Fiesta"	Michael Sullivan; Paulo Massadas	3:55
10.	"La Tribu Del Amor"	Augusto Cesar; Carlos Colla	3:42
11.	"La Danza Del Coco"	Augusto Cezar; Carlos Colla	3:17
12.	"Una Equis en tu Corazón"	Sarah P. Benchimol; Fafy Siqueira	3:30
13.	"Xuxa Park"	Michael Sullivan; Paulo Massadas	4:40
14.	"América Total"	Marcos Valle; Claudio Rabello; Max Pierre	5:54
Total length:			58:30

== Single ==
Year	Country	Chart	Single	Best Position	Ref.
1992	Spain	European Hot 100	Sensación De Vivir	1	
1992	US	Hot Latin Songs	Que Cosa Buena	37	

== Personnel ==
- Xuxa's Spanish voice direction: Graciela Carballo
- Produced by: Michael Sullivan, Paulo Massadas and Max Pierre
- Makeup Department: Bernie Grundman Mastering
- Mastering Engineer: Chris Bellman
- Regency:Jorginho Correa
- Photos: Isabel Garcia
- Graphic Coordination: Marciso Pena Carvalho
- Hair: Fátima Lisboa
- Artistic Coordination: Max Pierre and Marlene Mattos
- Selection of repertoire: Xuxa, Marlene Mattos, Michael Sullivan and Paulo Massadas
- Recording Engineers: Jorge Gordo Guimarães, Luis Guilherme D Orey and Luiz Paulo
- Recording Assistants: Marcelo Serôdio, Julio Carneiro, Mauro Moraes, Julinho, Claudinho, Ivan and Billy
- Recorded at the studios: Free Sound, Live Voice, Lincoln Olivetti, Yahoo, New Clothes and Cave II
- Costume Designer: Sandra Bandeira
- Musician: Roberto Fernandes
- Voice recording of the adult choir: Graciela Carballo

== Release history ==
Region	Date	Label	Format	Ref.
Argentina	1992	LP; K7; CD	Globo Records / RCA Records	
Colombia	1992	LP; K7	Globo Records	
Bolivia	1992	LP; K7	BMG Ariola	
Canada	1992	CD	Globo Records / BMG Ariola	
Spain	1992	LP; K7; CD	RCA Records	
United States	1992	K7; CD	Globo Records	
