= List of best-selling albums in Argentina =

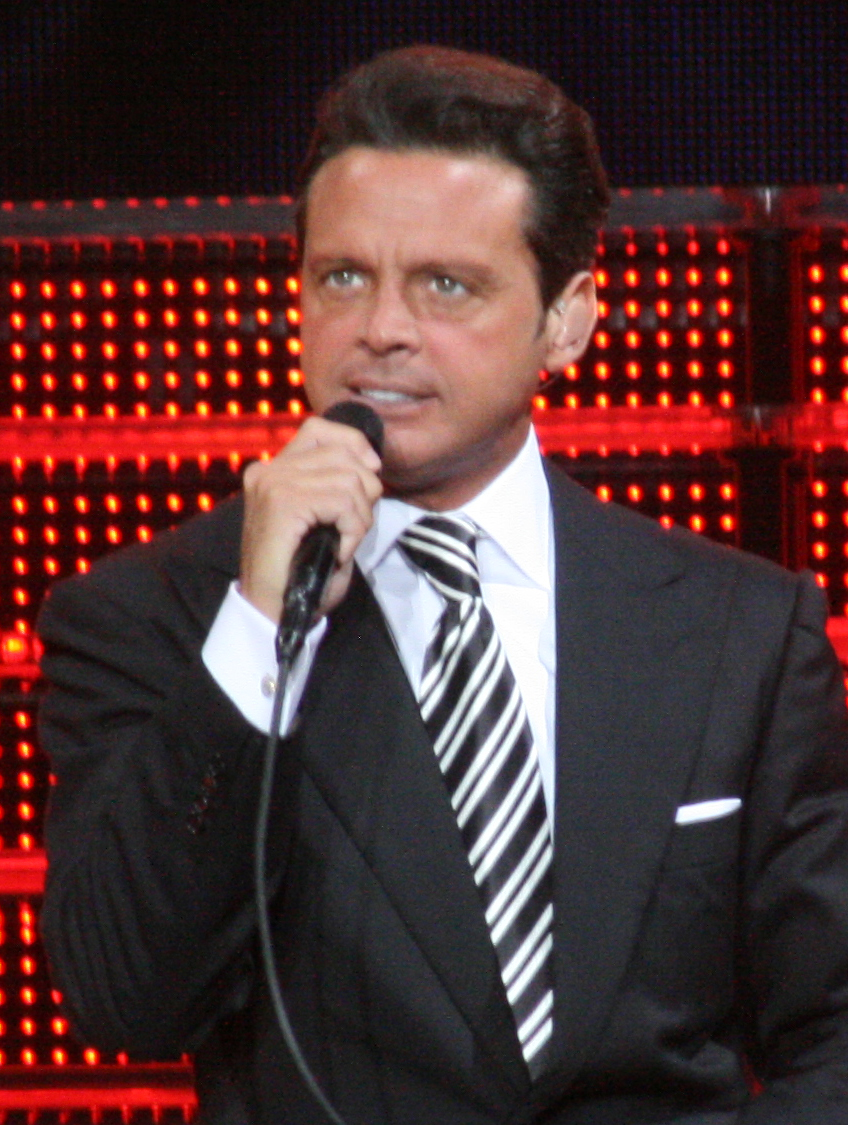
Luis Miguel's Romance (1991) is arguably the best-selling album in Argentina, and he has the most Diamond-certified albums in CAPIF's history (four)

The following list includes some of the best-selling albums in Argentina with at least 300,000 copies sold or certified by CAPIF, Argentina's record industry association. (Note: Albums released after 2001 with Diamond status, such as Los Nocheros' Nocheros (2001) are not included in the list unless sales reported by media indicates the record sold 300,000 or more copies. Certifications indicated by media outside of CAPIF's database, are marked with bold.) Argentina has consistently been one of the largest music markets in Latin America, being ranked 34th worldwide in 2008. Albums are listed in order of certification or reported sales (highest to lowest), and release date (earliest to most recent). This list contains any type of album, including studio, greatest hits, compilation, various artists, soundtrack, DVDs and remix.

According to one publication in 2000, some of the most popular artists, notably rock groups reached half a million copies with some of their releases beginning in 1982 and throughout the decade of the 1990s. In the album era, rock nacional was a popular style in the country, and Fito Páez's El amor después del amor (1992) remains both the best-selling rock album and by a native artist in Argentina with over 1 million copies. Luis Miguel's Romance (1991) is arguably the best-selling album in Argentina's history, with over 1.3 million copies sold as of 1999.

Luis Miguel also has the most certified albums with Diamond status in CAPIF's history, with four, followed by Julio Iglesias and Soledad Pastorutti with two each. Michael Jackson, the Beatles and Queen have the only English-language records certified with Diamond.

== Historical accreditation levels ==
=== Albums ===
Period	Gold certification	Platinum certification	Diamond certification
January 1980–December 31, 2000	30,000	60,000	500,000
January 1, 2001 – June 30, 2016	20,000	40,000	250,000
July 1, 2016–present	10,000	20,000	135,000

=== DVDs ===
Period	Gold certification	Platinum certification	Diamond certification
Until 2011	4,000	8,000	N/A
2011–June 30, 2016	7,500	15,000	75,000
July 1, 2016–present	5,000	10,000	50,000

== List ==
Artist	Album	Released	Sales	Certification
Luis Miguel	Romance	1991	1,354,795	Diamond
Fito Páez	El amor después del amor	1992	1,100,000	Diamond
Leonardo Favio	Fuiste mía un verano	1968	1,000,000	—N/a
Mercedes Sosa	Mercedes Sosa en Argentina	1982	1,000,000 (Note: Estimated sales according to author and journalist Facundo Arroyo, before its producer sold album's copyright to Polygram, and did not register post-sales in Argentina. According to Arroyo, various musicologists agreed the album sold very well throughout the next ten years after its publication. Américas by Organization of American States in 1996, described the album sold "several hundred thousand copies, an extraordinary success in a country of around 30 million inhabitants".)	—N/a
Luis Miguel	Segundo Romance	1994	813,082	Diamond
Luis Miguel	Romances	1997	781,000	Diamond
Luis Miguel	Aries	1993	693,162	Diamond
Julio Iglesias	El amor	1975	678,285	Diamond
Julio Iglesias	Emociones	1978	636,294	Diamond
Soledad Pastorutti	Poncho al viento	1996	620,510	Diamond
Michael Jackson	Thriller	1982	576,779	Diamond
Julio Sosa	Álbum de Oro	1962	551,890	Diamond
the Beatles	Abbey Road	1969	506,916	Diamond
Queen	Greatest Hits	1981	506,916	Diamond
Miguel Mateos "Zas"	Rockas Vivas	1985	500,000	—N/a
Soda Stereo	Canción Animal	1990	500,000	—N/a
Luis Miguel	Nada es Igual	1996	500,000	7× Platinum
Soledad Pastorutti	La Sole	1997	500,000	Diamond
Andrea Bocelli	Romanza	1997	500,000	6× Platinum (Note: Combined for its Spanish and Italian versions)
Chayanne	Atado a Tu Amor	1998	500,000	5× Platinum
Queen	Greatest Hits II	1991	495,000	8× Platinum
Roberto Carlos	Los Más Grandes Éxitos Vol. II	1984	480,000	8× Platinum
Julio Iglesias	Un hombre solo	1987	480,000	8× Platinum
Xuxa	Xuxa 2	1991	435,000	—N/a
Diego Torres	Tratar de Estar Mejor	1994	430,000	6× Platinum
María Martha Serra Lima	Esencia romántica	1981	420,000	7× Platinum
Julio Iglesias	Momentos	1982	420,000	7× Platinum
Juan Luis Guerra	Bachata Rosa	1990	420,000	—N/a
Maná	MTV Unplugged	1999	420,000	7× Platinum
Sui Generis	Vida	1973	400,000	—N/a
Julio Iglesias	A México	1975	400,000	—N/a
Xuxa	Xuxa (Shusha)	1989	400,000	—N/a
Attaque 77	El Cielo Puede Esperar	1990	400,000	4× Platinum
Roxette	Joyride	1991	400,000	—N/a
Shakira	Dónde Están los Ladrones?	1998	365,000	4× Platinum
Madonna	The Immaculate Collection	1990	360,000	6× Platinum
Guns N' Roses	Use Your Illusion II	1991	360,000	6× Platinum
Ace of Base	The Sign	1993	360,000	—N/a
Julio Iglesias	La Carretera	1995	360,000	6× Platinum
Ricky Martin	A Medio Vivir	1995	360,000	6× Platinum
José Luis Perales	15 Grandes Éxitos	1995	360,000	6× Platinum
Los Nocheros	Nocheros	1999	360,000	6× Platinum
Julio Iglesias	Hey!	1980	350,000	—N/a
Madonna	True Blue	1986	350,000	4× Platinum
Ricardo Arjona	Historias	1994	350,000	4× Platinum
Enrique Iglesias	Cosas del Amor	1999	350,000	—N/a
Los Fabulosos Cadillacs	Vasos Vacíos	1994	310,000	—N/a
The Beatles	Sgt. Pepper's Lonely Hearts Club Band	1967	300,000	5× Platinum (Note: Combined for its Original (1967) and Reissue (1987))
Luis Miguel	20 Años	1990	300,000	5× Platinum
Phil Collins	Serious Hits... Live!	1990	300,000	5× Platinum
Guns N' Roses	Use Your Illusion I	1991	300,000	5× Platinum
Metallica	Metallica	1991	300,000	5× Platinum
Ricardo Montaner	En el último lugar del mundo	1991	300,000	4× Platinum
Eros Ramazzotti	Todo Historias	1993	300,000	Platinum
Fito Páez	Circo Beat	1994	300,000	5× Platinum
Shakira	Pies Descalzos	1995	300,000	2× Platinum
Rosana Arbelo	Lunas Rotas	1996	300,000	5× Platinum
Various	Chiquititas Vol. 2	1996	300,000	—N/a
Alejandro Sanz	Mas	1997	300,000	5× Platinum
Backstreet Boys	Backstreet's Back	1997	300,000	5× Platinum
Luis Miguel	Amarte es un Placer	1999	300,000	5× Platinum

== Best-selling albums by year ==
According to CAPIF
Year	Album	Artist	Sales
1991	Xuxa 2	Xuxa	350,000
1992	Romance	Luis Miguel	411,502
1994	Segundo Romance	Luis Miguel	689,847
1996	Nada Es Igual	Luis Miguel	—N/a
1997	Romances	Luis Miguel	670,000
1998	Cosas del Amor	Enrique Iglesias	—N/a
2001	Señal de Amor	Los Nocheros	—N/a
2002	Noche	Bandana	—N/a
2003	No Es lo Mismo	Alejandro Sanz	—N/a
2004	La Argentinidad al Palo	Bersuit Vergarabat	—N/a
2005	Floricienta	Floricienta y su banda	—N/a
2006	High School Musical	Various	—N/a
2007	Patito Feo	Various	—N/a
2008	La Vida es una Fiesta	Various	—N/a
2009	Cantora, un Viaje Íntimo	Mercedes Sosa	—N/a
2010	En Total Plenitud	Marco Antonio Solís	—N/a
2011	Música + Alma + Sexo	Ricky Martin	—N/a
2012	21	Adele	—N/a
2013	Hoy somos más	Violetta	—N/a

== Highest certified video and DVD albums ==
Artist	DVD	Released	Certification
Guns N' Roses	Use Your Illusion II	1991	12× Platinum
Guns N' Roses	Use Your Illusion I	1999	10× Platinum
Bob Marley & The Wailers	Leyenda	1992	8× Platinum
La Renga	Despedazado por Mil Partes	1996	8× Platinum
Aerosmith	Big Ones	1994	6× Platinum
Bersuit	De la Cabeza	2002	6× Platinum
Phil Collins	Serious Hits	2003	6× Platinum

== See also ==
- List of best-selling albums
  - List of best-selling albums by country
- List of best-selling singles by country§Argentina
