= Todos sus Éxitos =

Greatest hits album by Xuxa
- Released: 1993
- Recorded: 1989–1992
- Genre: Latin pop; children's music
- Length: 66:00
- Label: RCA Records (Europe); BMG (Latin America)
- Producer: Michael Sullivan; Paulo Massadas; Guto Graça Melo

Xuxa chronology
Xuxa 3 (1992)	Todos sus Éxitos (1993)	Talk to Me (1994)

Todos sus Éxitos (English: All Her Hits) is the fourth Spanish language album by Brazilian recording artist Xuxa. It was released in 1993.

== Production ==
Todos sus Éxitos was produced by Michael Sullivan, Paulo Massadas and Guto Graça Mello.

== Release and reception ==
Todos sus Éxitos was released in 1993, of the hits hits the most famous songs of the albums Xuxa 1, Xuxa 2 and Xuxa 3, being that the first two reached the fourth and seventh position in Billboard Latin Pop Albums respectively, being that the second remained in the table by 27 weeks among the best sellers of according to Billboard magazine. In Argentina, Todos sus Éxitos debuted in second place among the top 10, according to the publication.

== Track listing ==
Todos sus Éxitos
No.	Title	Writer(s)	Length
1.	"El Show de Xuxa Comenzó"	Dido de Oliveira	4:14
2.	"Ilarié"	Cid Guerreiro; Dito; Ceinha.	5:28
3.	"Sensación de Vivir"	Davis; José Luiz Tierno	3:48
4.	"Hoy es Día de Alegría"	Nando Cordel	4:10
5.	"Loquita Por ti"	Cid Guerreiro; Dito	3:23
6.	"Chindolele"	Cid Guerreiro; Dito	4:04
7.	"Que Cosa Buena"	Lincoln Olivetti; Cláudio Olivetti	4:14
8.	"Dulce Miel"	Claudio Rabello; Renato Correa	3:24
9.	"Danza de Xuxa"	Prêntice; Ronaldo Monteiro de Souza	3:25
10.	"Una Equis En Tu Corazón"	Sarah P. Benchimol; Fafy Siqueira	3:29
11.	"Arco Iris"	Michael Sullivan; Paulo Massadas; Ana Penido	4:37
12.	"Crocki Crocki"	Rubens Alexandre	3:18
13.	"America Total"	Marco Valle; Claudio Rabello; Max Pierre	5:54
14.	"I Love You Xuxu"	Michael Sullivan; Paulo Massadas	4:01
15.	"Nuestro Canto De Paz"	Dido de Oliveira	4:04
16.	"Xuxa Park"	Michael Sullivan; Paulo Massadas	4:40
Total length:			66:00

== Personnel ==
- Produced: Michael Sullivan, Paulo Massadas and Guto Graça Mello
- Recording and mixing technician: Jorge "Gordo" Guimarães
- Xuxa's Spanish voice direction: Graciela Carballo
- Artistic Coordination: Max Pierre and Guto Graça Mello

== Chart ==
Chart (1994)	Peak position
Argentina (CAPIF)	2

== Certifications ==
Region	Certification	Certified units/sales
Argentina (CAPIF)	2× Platinum	120,000^{^}
^{^} Shipments figures based on certification alone.

== Release history ==
Region	Date	Format	Label
Argentina	1993	CD; K7	BMG Ariola; RCA Records
Chile	1993	K7	BMG Ariola; RCA Records
Spain	1993	CD; K7	BMG Ariola; RCA Records
