= Talk to Me (Xuxa album) =

Studio album by Xuxa
- Released: Unreleased
- Genre: Pop; dance-pop; bubblegum pop; children's music
- Label: MTM Enterprises
- Producer: Eric Thorngren

Xuxa chronology
Todos sús Éxitos (1993)	Talk to Me (Unreleased)	El Pequeño Mundo (1994)

Talk to Me is the first English language album by Brazilian recording artist Xuxa. The album is a compilation of Xuxa's most popular songs in English versions for her TV show - Xuxa - but the material was never released commercially neither in America, nor in Brazil.

== Background ==
Xuxa is a Brazilian entertainer who made her singing debut in 1985 with the Portuguese language album Xuxa e Seus Amigos. In 1990, she began releasing Spanish music in both North and South America, which was well received.

An English language album for the U.S. market was planned to hit stores in 1994, to coincide with the release of the second season of her English language variety show Xuxa. The album was to consist of 20 English adaptions of her previous Portuguese songs and one new original song, Talk to Me for which the album was named.

== Production ==
For the American television show, Xuxa re-recorded several of her hits in English. The songs have had their length shortened - allegedly a decision by the network so they were not long and tiring. In addition to the hits already known to her Latin fans, Xuxa also recorded an entire new song titled Talk to me, which explicitly made an appeal for the public to be patient in regards to her poor English. The song featured a typical Brazilian sound with drums, also known in her native as "Axé" (ah-sheh).

Most songs have simply added new voice over the instrumental material used in her Spanish and Portuguese versions. In majority most of the lyrics were translations with words carefully chosen not to lose rhyme however songs such as Do Say have turned out completely unrelated to its Portuguese and Spanish counterparts. The opening and closing theme used in the show was Xuxa and Her Friends (in Portuguese "O Xou da Xuxa Começou").

The songs have only been released on cassette tapes that was comes into Xuxa's Dolls.

== Availability ==
In 1994, the Sony Wonder has acquired domestic home video rights of television series Xuxa, and launched two gift boxes on VHS: Xuxa: Funtastic Birthday Party and Xuxa Celebration! with Cheech Marin.

A counterfeit version of the unreleased CD ripped from old VHS tapes and featuring poor quality for most songs have been found in online shops. It appears that these fake CDs were selling reasonably well until Xuxa Produções (Xuxa's production company) got them removed.

== Track listing ==
No.	Title	Writer(s)	Producer(s)	Length
1.	"Xuxa And Her Friends (O Xou da Xuxa começou)"	Dido de Oliveira	Monique Dayan	4:16
2.	"Shindolele (Tindolelê)"	Cid Guerreiro / Dito	Bill Bonk	4:05
3.	"Ylarie (Ilariê)"	Cid Guerreiro / Dito / Ceinha	Deborah Blando	5:42
4.	"Song of Peace (Nosso Canto de Paz)"	Dido de Oliveira	Monique Dayan	4:00
5.	"Shining Star (Pinel por Você)"	Baê / Cid Guerreiro / Dito	Mats Roden	3:21
6.	"Xuxa's Dance (Dança da Xuxa)"	Prêntice / Ronaldo Monteiro de Souza	Monique Dayan	3:06
7.	"Mark An X (Marquei um X)"	Sarah P. Benchimol / Fafy Siqueira	Mats Roden	3:30
8.	"Talk To Me"	Monique Dayan	Monique Dayan	3:40
9.	"Do Say (Doce Mel)"	Cláudio / Renato Correa	Monique Dayan	3:08
10.	"Rainbow (Arco-Íris)"	Michael Sullivan / Paulo Massadas / Anna Penido	Monique Dayan	4:37
11.	"Xuxa's Alphabet (Abecedário da Xuxa)"	César Costa Filho / Ronaldo Monteiro de Souza	Mats Roden	3:39
12.	"Xspecial Recipe (Rexeita da Xuxa)"	Arnaldo / Mônica Freitas	Monique Dayan	3:11
13.	"Suzanna! (A Pulga)"	Afo Verde, Pablo Durand	Mats Roden	2:57
14.	"Froogy Froogy (Croc Croc)"	Rubens Alexandre	Mats Roden	3:15
15.	"Celebration (Hoje É Dia de Folia)"	Nando Cordel	Mats Roden	4:19
16.	"Life Is A Party (A Vida É Uma Festa)"	Michael Sullivan / Paulo Massadas	Monique Dayan	3:48
17.	"We Live For Love (A Tribo do Amor)"	Augusto César / Carlos Colla	Mats Roden	3:41
18.	"No Drugs (Alerta)"	César Costa Filho / Sérgio Fonseca / Reinaldo Waisman	Mats Roden	3:52
19.	"Whole America (América Total)"	Marco Valle / Claudio Rabello / M. Pierre	Monique Dayan	4:25
20.	"Miracle (Milagre da Vida)"	Michael Sullivan / Paulo Massadas	Mats Roden	4:03
21.	"Xuxa's Dream (Lua de Cristal)"	Michael Sullivan / Paulo Massadas	Monique Dayan	4:20
Total length:				1:10:57

== Performances ==
Many of the tracks from this album were performed on her show, several of them were also released on cassette tapes which were included with the line of Xuxa dolls produced by RoseArt in 1993. Low-quality, unofficial versions of this album have circulated on the market but no official studio version has been released except for the tracks "Talk To Me", "Do Say'' (Doce Mel), "Ylarie" and "Whole America", all released by Xuxa Produções itself. (In the case of "Ylarie", only one minute of the studio version was released in a video commemorating the 30th anniversary of the album Xou Da Xuxa 3 and the Portuguese version, which was very successful in the 80s). In addition to "Xuxa's Dance" which was taken from one of the K7's that came with the dolls and remastered by fans.

The only performance outside the Xuxa's program as far we know was the performance of the track "Miracle" (Milagre da Vida), which was sung during the 1993 American Telethon.
