= El Pequeño Mundo =

Studio album by Xuxa
- Released: October 20, 1994
- Recorded: 1994
- Genres: Latin pop; teen pop
- Length: 63:50
- Labels: Polygram; Mercury Records
- Producers: Manuel Calderón; Michael Sullivan

Xuxa chronology
Talk to Me (1994)	El Pequeño Mundo (1994)	Xuxa Dance (1996)

Singles from El Pequeño Mundo
- 1. "Que Sí, Que No" Released: 1994; 2. "Juego de La Rima" Released: 1994; 3. "Palomitas de Maiz" Released: 1994

El Pequeño Mundo (English: The Little World) is the nineteenth studio album and the fourth in Spanish language album by Brazilian recording artist Xuxa Meneghel. It was released in October 20, 1994 by Polygram (today Universal Music).

== Production ==
El Pequeño Mundo was directed by Manuel Calderón and was produced by Michael Sullivan. The graphic design was under the command of Xuxa and Reinaldo Waisman. Xuxa spent ten days in Miami recording his new album in Spanish. The song "Happy sí" that was composed by Carlinhos Brown, who also participates in music, the singer had to travel to Miami to re-record the Spanish version of the song.

El Pequeño Mundo is a Spanish version of Xuxa's tenth Brazilian studio album, Sexto Sentido (1994). The tracks of the album are basically composed by Spanish versions of some songs from the Brazilian album, such as "Grito de Guerra" by Chiclete com Banana, and a cover version of "O Pato" by João Gilberto, and the unpublished "Muy Pequeño El Mundo Es ", "Que Sí, Que No" and Voy a Salir de Reventón". the song "Grito de Guerra", by Chiclete com Banana, was also recorded in Portuguese to enter the album Sexto Sentido, but only the Spanish version was released. The album also marks the change of international label of Xuxa, until then their albums were released by "Globo Records". This is the first Xuxa musical project released by Polygram/Mercury Records.

== Release and reception ==
Professional ratings
Review scores
Source	Rating
AllMusic	3/5 stars

El Pequeño Mundo was first released in Argentina in mid-October 1994, shortly after throughout Latin America, Spain and the United States. In Chile, El Pequeño Mundo had positive sales reached the sixth position among the most sold in its first week, according to Billboard magazine.

== Promotion ==
To promote the new album, Xuxa was in Buenos Aires in mid-December 1994, and made two Pocket Shows in the programs Hola Susana and Ritmo de la noche in Telefé. El Pequeño Mundo had sales of more than 120,000 copies.

== Track listing ==
Side one
No.	Title	Writer(s)	Length
1.	"Juego de la Rima"	Shirley Elliston; Lincoln Chase; Versão: Zé Henrique; Ângela Mattos; Marcelo Farias	5:51
2.	"Happy sí"	Carlinhos Brown	4:02
3.	"Grito de Guerra"	Waldinho Marques; Bell (Chiclete com Banana)	3:31
4.	"Danza de Las Estrellas"	Michael Sullivan; Aloysio Reis	4:28
5.	"Es de Chocolate"	Michael Sullivan; Paulo Massadas	4:52
6.	"Un Pato"	Jaime Silva; Nevsa Teixeira	2:57
7.	"Soy Feliz"	Michael Sullivan; Aloysio Reis	4:23
Total length:			33:02

Side two
No.	Title	Writer(s)	Length
1.	"Muy Pequeño el Mundo es" (It's a Small World)	D. R.	4:48
2.	"El Paso Del Amor"	Carlinhos Brown	3:59
3.	"Sexto Sentido"	Michael Sullivan; Aloysio Reis	5:01
4.	"Que sí, Que no"	Cid Guerreiro	3:35
5.	"Solo Faltas tú"	César Lemos; Marcello Azevedo	3:30
6.	"Voy a Salir de Reventón"	Michael Sullivan; Aloysio Reis	3:17
7.	"Palomitas de Maíz"	Cesar Borg; Angel; Cid Guerreiro	3:25
8.	"Reír es el Mejor Remedio"	Zé Henrique; Fred Pereira	3:38
Total length:			31:41

Xuxa 3 – CD edition
No.	Title	Writer(s)	Length
1.	"Juego de la rima" (Jogo Da Rima)	Shirley Elliston; Lincoln Chase; Versão: Zé Henrique; Ângela Mattos; Marcelo Farias	5:51
2.	"Happy sí" (Happy-Py)	Carlinhos Brown	4:02
3.	"Grito de guerra"	Waldinho Marques; Bell (Chiclete com Banana)	3:31
4.	"Danza de las estrellas" (Dança Nas Estrelas)	Michael Sullivan; Aloysio Reis	4:28
5.	"Es de chocolate" (É De Chocolate)	Michael Sullivan; Paulo Massadas	4:52
6.	"Un pato"	Jaime Silva; Nevsa Teixeira	2:57
7.	"Reír es el mejor remedio" (Rir É O Melhor Remédio (Gargalhada))	Zé Henrique; Fred Pereira	3:38
8.	"Muy pequeño el mundo es" (It's a Small World)	D. R.	4:48
9.	"El paso del amor" (Compasso Do Amor)	Carlinhos Brown	3:59
10.	"Sexto sentido" (Sexto Sentido)	Michael Sullivan; Aloysio Reis	5:01
11.	"Que sí, que no"	Cid Guerreiro	3:35
12.	"Solo faltas tú" (Só Falta Você)	César Lemos; Marcello Azevedo	3:30
13.	"Voy a salir de reventón"	Michael Sullivan; Aloysio Reis	3:17
14.	"Palomitas de maíz" (Pipoca)	Cesar Borg; Angel; Cid Guerreiro	3:25
15.	"Soy feliz" (Hey DJ)	Michael Sullivan; Aloysio Reis	4:23
Total length:			58:30

== Personnel ==
- Art Direction: Manuel Calderón
- Graphic design: Xuxa Meneghel and Reinaldo Waisman
- Directed by: Michael Sullivan
- Production Assistant: Tania Mahon
- Xuxa's Spanish voice direction: Graciela Carballo
- Voice Direction: Akiko Endo (Japanese), Ugo Chiarato (Italian), Corinne Merkin (French), Hagai Goian (Hebrew)
- Adult Chorus Voice Recording: Crescent Moon Studio
- Choir: Rodolfo Castillo, Georgina Cruz, César Nascimento, Jorge Noriega, Wendy Pederson and Rita Quinter
- Voice and choir adult – engineer: Carlos Alvarez
- Arrangement and preparation of keyboards: Marcello Azevedo
- Electric guitar: César Nascimento
- Arrangement of metals: Ed Calle and Rodolfo Castillo
- Musicians: Ed Calle, Tony Concepción, Dana Teboe, Tim Barnes, Glenn Basham, Rafael Elvira, Joan Falgen, PH
- Recording of children's choir: Art Sullivan Home Studio, Castle Recording Studio
- Children's Choir: Anthony Carvajal, Giovanni de Paz, Juliana Lima, Maya Mingyar, Manuel Pascual, Jessy Lin Pole
- Engineers: Marcello Azevedo, Alfredo Matheus, Carlos Alvarez
- Assistants: Sebastian Krys, Alfredo Matheus
- Metal engraving: A Studio
- Mixed in Crescent Moon: by Antonio Moog Canazio
- Photos: Luis Crispino
- Costume Designer: Willis Ribeiro
- Hair: Márcia Regina Elias
- Makeup Department: Roberto Fernandes

== Chart ==
Chart (1995)	Peak position
Chile (IFPI Chile)	6

== Release history ==
Region	Date	Format	Label
Argentina	1994	LP (promocional); K7; CD	Polygram; Mercury; Philips
Mexico	1994	K7; CD	Polygram; Mercury
Peru	1994	K7	Mercury
Spain	1994	CD	Philips; Polygram
United States	1994	CD	Mercury; Polygram
