= Ilarie =

Ilarie is a Romanian-language masculine given name that may refer to:

- Ilarie Chendi
- Ilarie Voronca

== See also ==
- "Ilariê", a Brazilian pop song
