= Xou da Xuxa Sete =

Studio album by Xuxa
- Released: October 2, 1992
- Recorded: 1992
- Genres: Pop; children's music
- Length: 46:39
- Label: Som Livre
- Producers: Michael Sullivan; Paulo Massadas

Xuxa chronology
Xou da Xuxa Seis (1991)	Xou da Xuxa Sete (1992)	Xuxa (1993)

Singles from Xou da Xuxa Sete
- 1. "Nosso Canto de Paz" Released: 1992; 2. "Marquei um X" Released: 1992; 3. "A Vida é Uma Festa" Released: 1992; 4. "Tribo do Amor" Released: 1992; 5. "Ai Que Coisa Boa" Released: 1992

Xou da Xuxa Sete (English: Xuxa's Show Seven) is the eleventh studio album by Brazilian recording artist Xuxa Meneghel. It was released on October 2, 1992, by Som Livre. It was the last album of the series Xuxa Show.

The disc features a more mature and cheerful Xuxa with lambada influences. The songs "Marquei um X" and "Nosso Canto de Paz" have been described as highlights. Xou da Xuxa Sete sold approximately 1 million copies.

== Production ==
In 1991, Xuxa still decided whether or not Xou da Xuxa program would be closed that year. But, I was almost certain that the sixth album of the same title of the program, would be the last of the series. Already it was thought of a collection with the hits of the Xou and a song book, a book with tablature and instrumental scores of some successes of the singer. With the continuation of the program in 1992, was produced the last album of the series.

In an interview, Xuxa even commented that he has received a lot of excited songs for the album and in fact, the album is quite cheerful, despite the air of farewell. The first ones to be recorded were: "Xuxa Park" and "A Vida é Uma Festa", which served as the theme for Xou da Xuxa that season.

The actress Fafy Siqueira who wrote "A Dança do Paloê" for the Xou da Xuxa Seis (1991), the previous year wrote another song especially for the Queen. "Marquei um X" merge its joyful rhythm with the mood of farewell, asking the public to remember Xuxa and his concert with great affection.

As was done since the fifth album of the series, most of the songs recorded for Xou Sete were also recorded in Spanish language. Even those discarded as Earth and Heart and My Mirror.

Initially, the album would be called Xétimo Xou da Xuxa. However, they opted for Xou Xuxa Sete, with the number 7 in full, as well as the previous disk. It would be released between the end of August and the beginning of September, but due to delays in production was released in October.

One of the highlights of the disc is the insert stuffed with images from the personal archive of Xuxa. Several childhood photos were selected, along with the singer's birth certificate and a photo of the rehearsal for the album.

Some of the discarded tracks from the album were made known to the public when they were released on the album Xuxa in 1993. In addition to the previously mentioned, "Brincando com o Tempo" and "Maçã do Amor" were also added to the album.

"Lá vem o Trem", composition by Evandro Mesquita was removed from the album at the last minute. In fact, the title of the song even became known to the press.

Xou da Xuxa Sete was produced by Michael Sullivan and Paulo Massadas, with artistic coordination Marlene Mattos and Xuxa. It was recorded in the studios of Som Livre, and had artistic direction of Max Pierre.

== Release and reception ==
Xou da Xuxa Sete release took place in mid-1992 by Som Livre, the first released the album was on LP. The CD and cassette edition were released in the following weeks. The television program Xou da Xuxa ends at the end of this year and the production was already preparing for a great change in the presenter's career. The year 1992 was decisive in the career of Xuxa, since she had already recorded programs outside Brazil and her international albums had sold well, abroad.

The album was reissued in 1996 in CD and cassette, in 2006 and 2009 in CD, and in 2013 by Som Livre in partnership with Xuxa Produções, the album is part of the box Collection of the Xou da Xuxa. Xou da Xuxa Sete sold more than 1 million copies.

== Promotion ==
The songs of Xou da Xuxa Sete used to be performed in Xou da Xuxa and Paradão da Xuxa. The blonde also sang some tracks, mainly "Nosso Canto de Paz", "A Vida é Uma Festa", "A Pulga" and "Marquei um X", that were the most worked, besides "Xuxa Park" that was used as descent of the ship in the final season of the Xuxa Park. "Marquei um X", "Baila Baila", "A Pulga", "Nosso Canto de Paz", "A Vida é Uma Festa" and "América Geral" won music videos at that year's Christmas special.

Unlike previous albums, Xuxa did not even disclose Xou Sete in another TV show that was not her own. On April 25, 1993, the blonde sang some of her hits in Domingão do Faustão, in addition to "Marquei um X" and "Nosso Canto de Paz", but the participation in the program was with the intention of releasing the program Xuxa, which debuted the following Sunday and not to release the latest album.

There was also a release of the album on the radio. It was sent to radios all over Brazil, the CD-single of the song "Marquei um X", shortly before the album's release. In addition, on October 10, 1992, Xuxa gave an interview to the radio station FM 105 in the program Sala de Visitas (Visiting Room).

Due to the delay in the release of the album and the accumulation of appointments in the Xuxa agenda, only two concerts of the Xuxa 92 tour in Brazil were performed: one in São Paulo and another in Belo Horizonte.

It was broadcast during Rede Globo's programming, two commercials releasing the launch, The first of 30 seconds and the second of 10 seconds.

== Track listing ==
Xou da Xuxa Sete – LP, Cassette and CD edition
No.	Title	Writer(s)	Length
1.	"Marquei um X"	Sarah P. Benchimol; Fafy Siqueira	3:32
2.	"A Vida é Uma Festa"	Michael Sullivan; Paulo Massadas	3:47
3.	"A Tribo do Amor"	Augusto Cesar; Carlos Colla	3:41
4.	"Mamboleo"	Cesar Borg Angel; Cid Guerreiro	3:40
5.	"Ai Que Coisa Boa"	Lincoln Olivetti; Claudio Olivetti	3:51
6.	"Xuxa Park"	Michael Sullivan; Paulo Massadas	4:40
7.	"Nosso Canto de Paz"	Dido Oliveira	4:05
8.	"Sorriso no Rosto"	Cid Guerreiro	2:53
9.	"A Pulga"	Reinaldo Waisman; Afo Verde; Pablo Durand	2:55
10.	"A Voz Dos Animais"	Prêntice; Ronaldo Monteiro de Souza; Marcos Fabiano	4:15
11.	"Baila Baila"	Michael Sullivan; Paulo Massadas; Ana Penido	3:58
12.	"América Geral"	Marcos Valle; Claudio Rabello; M. Pierre	5:33
Total length:			41:50

== Awards ==
Year	Awards	Category	Result
1992	6th Brazilian Music Awards	Best children's album	Won
1992	6th Brazilian Music Awards	Best children's song (A Voz dos Animais)	Won

== Personnel ==
- Produced: Michael Sullivan and Paulo Massadas
- Cover: Xuxa Meneghel and Reinaldo Waisman
- Artistic Coordination: Marlene Mattos and Xuxa Meneghel
- Recording Technician: Luiz G. D 'Orey and Luiz Paulo (LP)
- Mixing: Jorge 'Gordo' Guimarães
- Photos: Isabel Garcia
- Arrangement: Jorge 'Jorginho' Corrêa
- Studio Assistants and Mixing: Marcelo Serorio, Julio Carneiro, Mauro Moraes, Claudinho, Julinho, Ivan and Billy
- Graphic Coordination: Marciso 'Pena' Carvalho
- Edition of tape: Jorge 'Gordo' Guimarães
- Costume Designer: Sandra Bandeira
- Recorded in studios: Free Sound, Live Voice, Yahoo, New Clothes and Cave II
- Hair: Fátima Lisboa
- Musician: Roberto Fernandes
- Art Direction: Max Pierre

== Certifications ==
Certifications for "Xou da Xuxa Sete"
Region	Certification	Certified units/sales
Brazil (Pro-Música Brasil)	2× Platinum	500,000^{‡}
^{‡} Sales+streaming figures based on certification alone.
