= Luz no Meu Caminho =

Studio album by Xuxa
- Released: October 1995
- Recorded: 1995
- Genres: Dance-pop; teen pop; funk
- Length: 53:57
- Label: Som Livre
- Producer: Michael Sullivan

Xuxa chronology
Sexto Sentido (1994)	Luz no Meu Caminho (1995)	Tô de Bem com a Vida (1996)

Singles from Luz no Meu Caminho
- 1. "Xuxa Hits" Released: 1995; 2. "Salada Mixta" Released: 1995

Luz no Meu Caminho (English: Light On My Way) is the sixteenth studio album by Brazilian recording artist Xuxa Meneghel. Its released in October 1995, by Som Livre.

Like the previous release, Sexto Sentido (1994), Luz no Meu Caminho bets on the children's audience, with more mature songs and references of melodic funk and dance-pop. It has sold over 800,000 copies.

== Production and songs ==
After the success of the studio album Sexto Sentido, the audience that grew up with Xuxa wanted to see more and more songs aimed at teenagers, but the blonde still had the desire to make children's albums. The blonde even tried to get Paquitas to represent it with songs in this style, but the public's desire was stronger.

One of the first recorded songs for the album was Saturday, composed as the theme of the Xuxa Park program. Soon after came Xuxa Hits, composed based on the eponymous picture that had been gaining more and more notoriety, gaining its own scenery and an "independent" schedule of the Park.

The album approaches a more mature language bringing themes like ballad, religion, love and patriotism. One of the bands that stands out most is "Brasileira". The song portrays Xuxa's love for Brazil, extolling its people and culture. During the recording of the song, the presenter asked to include an excerpt from the 1994 World Cup narrative, when Brazil became four times champion, besides the story of Galvão Bueno in one of the victories of Ayrton Senna. The blonde also shows the love for her land in another track, but this time, talking about her hometown, Santa Rosa, Rio Grande do Sul, which gives title to the song.

"Príncipe Encantado" was written based on the time when Xuxa lived at the time. The blonde felt very alone and dreamed of finding a boy who could make her happy. The music features elements of melodic funk, rhythm that dominated the radios in that period. Still in funk from Rio, the album brought the track "Funkeiro" that initially would be interpreted by a boy who would live the history of the music. But, Xuxa and her team could not find anyone to match, the lyrics underwent some changes for the blonde herself to play. Lincoln Olivetti came up with a totally different arrangement for the song, but Marlene Mattos preferred the version of the demo tape sent by the composer.

The singer Abdullah participated in the song "Como o Sábio Diz", thus marking the first of several partnerships between him and the queen of the little ones. The composer also participated as backing vocal of several tracks of the disc.

"The Sexto Sentido (the previous album) was quite different not just by its name. It is a more mature album, my voice has improved a lot, it has become more technical. I have a small voice, not much extension, but I have learned to deal with my potential. This record is even better, Luz no Meu Caminho brings the music to the child, to the teenager to the family and in it I take my faith, my mystical side.

— Xuxa commenting on album content.

Among the more Children's music tracks, in addition to "Sábado" that was discarded at the end of the production, the presenter brought the joke "Salada Mixta", "Sorvete", "Xuá Xuá" and "Pra Quê Fumar?", that was written based on the campaign against the cigarette that the blonde starred in end of that year.

On the album, the blonde also talks about her belief in the track "Luz no Meu Caminho". In a more direct way, this song included the song "Crer Pra Ver", recorded for the Christmas special of 1994. The song has the special participation of the christian music singer Aline Barros.

Initially, "Brasileira" would be the title track of the album, but at the end of September they decided to change to Luz no Meu Caminho. For the art of the album, Xuxa herself chose the photo Hilly Desert Road Reflecting Sunset from photographer Eric Meola to illustrate the booklet.

Luz no Meu Caminho was produced by Michael Sullivan, music producer of Xuxa from the Xegundo Xou da Xuxa (1987), had artistic direction of Aramis Barros and artistic coordination of Marlene Mattos, Xuxa Meneghel and Helio de Freitas. It was recorded in the Som Livre studios.

== Release and reception ==
Luz no Meu Caminho It was released by Som Livre in October 1995 in CD, cassette and LP being the last released in this format. It was reissued in 2001 and 2006 on CD, with changes in the back cover and insert. The album reached the 5th position among the most sold CDs in its debut week. In its second week, it reached the 4th position. As of 1995, it has sold over 800,000 copies.

== Promotion ==
Beginning the release of the disc was released the song "Xuxa Hits". For the first time, Xuxa recorded a music video for a song with the sole intention of promoting her album and not just to show in her program and in specials. The video was distributed to the press and came to be shown on channels such as MTV Brasil and SBT. Gradually, other songs from Luz no Meu Caminho were released on the Xuxa Park show, but only "Salada Mixta" was released as a single.

On October 15, 1995, Xuxa participated in Domingão do Faustão singing the songs "Xuxa Hits" and "Salada Mixta", in addition to presenting the Paquitas and the group You Can Dance. Shortly thereafter, "Pra Quê Fumar?" was used as the theme of the Ministry of Health's campaign against cigarette smoking.

"Luz no Meu Caminho", "Salada Mixta", "Brasileira", "Como o Sábio Diz?", "Pra Quê Fumar?" and "Ritmos" won music videos at the Christmas special of 1995. The song "Crer Pra Ver" already had won a music video on last year's special. In the night program that celebrated the 10th anniversary of Xuxa in Globo in 1996, the song "Príncipe Encantado" also won a video.

Unlike the other albums, there was no tour of the Luz no Meu Caminho. In an interview shortly after the release of the album, the businesswoman of the time, the singer's manager Marlene Mattos justified that not touring was part of the marketing strategy. Marlene even considered the realization of two shows, one in Rio de Janeiro and another in São Paulo, with songs from the album, but it is not known why the plan did not materialize.

In addition to VHS, Sexto Sentido - O Xou, released in May 1996, Globo Vídeo even edited a VHS with the title Luz no Meu Caminho. It is unclear if the content would be the music videos from the album or the record of one of the shows planned by Marlene.

== Track listing ==
Side one
No.	Title	Writer(s)	Length
1.	"Brasileira"	César Lemos; Zé Henrique; Fred Pereira	4:22
2.	"Xuxa Hits"	Karla Aponte; César Lemos; Marcelo Azevedo	3:23
3.	"Mania de Malhar"	Solange Pereira; Zé Henrique	3:33
4.	"Salada Mixta"	Cláudio Matta; Álvaro Socci	2:56
5.	"Sorvete"	Zé Henrique; Fred Pereira; Beto Zettel	4:34
6.	"Ritmos"	Carlos Colla; Marcos Assunção	4:16
7.	"Luz no Meu Caminho (a Terra)"	Nando Cordel	3:48
Total length:			26:52

Side two
No.	Title	Writer(s)	Length
1.	"Príncipe Encantado"	Cláudio Matta; Álvaro Socci	3:57
2.	"Como o Sábio Diz" (featuring Abdulah)	Paulo Sergio Valle; Michael Sullivan	3:36
3.	"Funkeiro"	Abdula; Carlinhos Conceição; Paloma	3:38
4.	"Pra Que Fumar?"	Reinaldo Waisman; Marcos Levy	2:19
5.	"Xuá Xuá"	Cid Guerreiro; Dito	3:26
6.	"Santa Rosa"	Paulo Sergio Valle; Marcos Assunção	4:35
7.	"Crer Pra Ver" (featuring Aline Barros)	Cláudio Matta; Álvaro Socci	4:43
Total length:			26:14

Luz no Meu Caminho – CD edition
No.	Title	Writer(s)	Length
1.	"Brasileira"	César Lemos; Zé Henrique; Fred Pereira	4:22
2.	"Xuxa Hits"	Karla Aponte; César Lemos; Marcelo Azevedo	3:23
3.	"Mania de Malhar"	Solange Pereira; Zé Henrique	3:33
4.	"Salada Mixta"	Cláudio Matta; Álvaro Socci	2:56
5.	"Como o Sábio Diz" (featuring Abdulah)	Paulo Sergio Valle; Michael Sullivan	3:36
6.	"Funkeiro"	Abdula, Carlinhos Conceição; Paloma	3:38
7.	"Pra Quê Fumar?"	Reinaldo Waisman; Marcos Levy	2:19
8.	"Sorvete"	Zé Henrique; Fred Pereira; Beto Zettel	4:34
9.	"Ritmos"	Carlos Colla; Marcos Assunção	4:16
10.	"Príncipe Encantado"	Cláudio Matta; Álvaro Socci	3:57
11.	"Xuá Xuá"	Cid Guerreiro; Dito	3:26
12.	"Santa Rosa"	Paulo Sergio Valle; Marcos Assunção	4:35
13.	"Luz no Meu Caminho (a Terra)"	Nando Cordel	3:48
14.	"Crer Pra Ver" (featuring Aline Barros)	Cláudio Matta; Álvaro Socci	4:43
Total length:			53:06

== Personnel ==
- Produced: Michael Sullivan
- Art Direction: Aramis Barros
- Artistic Coordination: Marlene Mattos and Xuxa Meneghel
- Artistic Coordination: Helio de Freitas
- Recording Technician: Mario Jorge Santos
- Technical Supervision: Nolan Leve
- Recording Assistants: Mauro Moraes, Julio Carneiro, Everaldo and Ivan Carvalho
- Editing: Sergio Seabra
- Recorded in the studios: Som Livre
- Makeup Department: Promaster
- Production Assistant: Duda Nogueira
- Auxiliary Technicians: Sergio Rocha and Harley de Barros
- Recording Technician: Jorge 'Gordo'

== Certifications ==
Certifications for "Luz no Meu Caminho"
Region	Certification	Certified units/sales
Brazil (Pro-Música Brasil)	Platinum	250,000^{‡}
^{‡} Sales+streaming figures based on certification alone.
