= Lua de Cristal (song) =

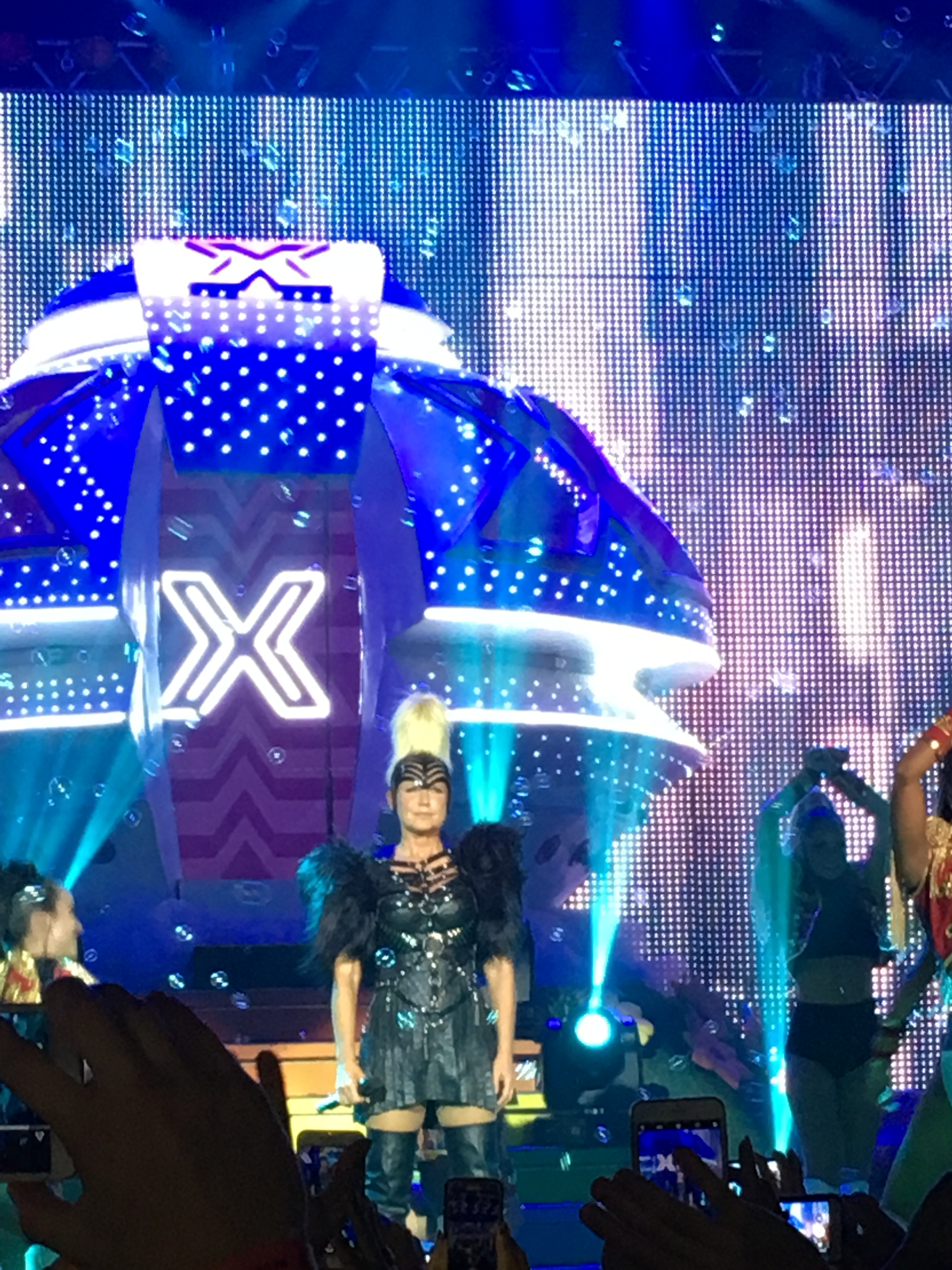

Single by Xuxa

from the album Xuxa 5
- Released: July 16, 1990
- Genre: Pop; Children's songs
- Label: Som Livre
- Songwriters: Michael Sullivan; Paulo Massadas
- Producer: Michael Sullivan

Xuxa singles chronology
"Pinel Por Você" (1990)	"Lua de Cristal" (1990)	"Vem Lambaxuxa" (1990)

Lua de Cristal (Spanish: Luna de Cristal; English: Crystal Moon) is a song by Brazilian singer Xuxa. It was released on July 16, 1990, by Som Livre along with his seventh studio album. Written by Michael Sullivan and Paulo Massadas, Luna de Cristal is the theme song from the 1990 Tizuka Yamasaki film of the same name starring Xuxa.

In addition, the song achieved international success, when it was released outside Brazil in 1991, reaching position #35 on the Billboard's Hot Latin Songs chart.

== Charts ==
Chart (1991)	Peak position
US Hot Latin Songs	35
