= 4º Xou da Xuxa =

Studio album by Xuxa
- Released: July 11, 1989
- Recorded: 1989
- Genre: Pop; Children's music
- Length: 51:57
- Label: Som Livre
- Producer: Michael Sullivan; Paulo Massadas

Xuxa chronology
Xou da Xuxa 3 (1988)	4º Xou da Xuxa (1989)	Xuxa 5 (1990)

Singles from 4º Xou da Xuxa
- 1. "Tindolelê" Released: 1989; 2. "Dinda ou Dindinha" Released: 1989; 3. "Milagre da Vida" Released: 1989; 4. "Remelexuxa" Released: 1989; 5. "Dona Girafa" Released: 1989

4º Xou da Xuxa (English: 4th Xuxa's Show) is the fifth studio album by Brazilian recording artist Xuxa Meneghel, released on 11 July 1989. This LP was the fourth album of the collection Xou da Xuxa of a total of seven.

The album sold over 3 million copies, being 2 million copies sold in advance, becoming the biggest selling album of Brazil in 1989, and the fourth best-selling album of her music career, is also the fifth best-selling album in the history of Brazilian music.

== Xuxa 4 ==
With the success of "Ilariê", released on the previous album, was ordered another hectic song Xou da Xuxa 3 (1988). This time, Cid Guerreiro brought "Tindolelê".

Another well-known track of the album is "Bobeou Dançou". The song was initially recorded by Michael Sullivan for the Xou da Xuxa scene, and was later recorded by Xuxa when it became a Sunday show.

The song "Alerta" was composed based on the letter a boy wrote to his father before he died, a victim of overdose, due to the use of drugs.

"A música não pode parar", originally recorded for this album, was re-recorded a few years later by paquito Alexandre.

It is not known where the pool trial was conducted. Some say the photos were taken at Marlene Mattos's site, others say it was at Xuxa's house.

== Release and reception ==
4º Xou da Xuxa hit the stores on July 11, 1989, by Som Livre, in CD, cassette and LP formats. The album was re-released in 1996 and in 2006. In 2013, Som Livre in partnership with Xuxa Produções, launched the Xou da Xuxa + CD inédito Seleção Fãs, a box with all 7 discs released at the time of the TV show, and with It a CD with unpublished songs, chosen by the fans of the TV host. The album receiving diamond certification by Associação Brasileira de Produtores de Discos (ABPD), sold 3,000,000 copies, surpassing all records released in Brazil that year, becoming Xuxa, the country's largest record seller.

Xou of the Xuxa 89 Tour, was the third tour performed by Xuxa, based on the album 4º Xou da Xuxa, the tour was presented in several cities in Brazil as Salvador, Natal, Brasília, Rio de Janeiro, São Paulo, Angra dos Reis and Feira de Santana. The shows that were performed outside Brazil were in Mexico City, Guadalajara, Buenos Aires, Santiago and Cordoba. The tour began on August 5, 1989 and ended on December 10 of that year.

== Promotion ==
Most of the songs were performed and performed on program Xou da Xuxa. A special edition of the child was made where the presenter released some songs from the album.

"Remelexuxa" got a clip at Fantástico (Fantastic) in 1989, "Milagre da Vida" got a music videos at the Christmas special of the same year and "Tindolelê" got a video at the 1990 Christmas special.

Xuxa also released the album in the programs Globo de Ouro and Domingão do Faustão. In addition to the Xou da Xuxa 89 tour, started on August 5, 1989 and closed on December 10 of the same year.

Also a TV commercial in three versions was published, advertisements in newspapers and magazines and billboards by some Brasília capitals of Brazil like São Paulo.

== Track listing ==
4º Xou da Xuxa – LP, Cassette and CD edition
No.	Title	Writer(s)	Length
1.	"Tindolelê"	Cid Guerreiro; Dito	4:04
2.	"Bobeou Dançou"	Michael Sullivan; Paulo Massadas	2:52
3.	"Conte Comigo"	Prêntice; Ronaldo Monteiro de Souza	3:54
4.	"Dinda ou Dindinha"	Osmar Osman; Hélio Makumba	3:38
5.	"Namorar"	Ed Wilson; Paulo Sérgio Vale	3:44
6.	"Milagre da Vida"	Sullivan; Massadas	4:00
7.	"Recado pra Xuxa" (featuring Amanda)	Sullivan; Massadas	2:45
8.	"Remelexuxa"	Chico Roque; Aylson Shalon	3:55
9.	"Vem Dançar Comigo"	Zá Henrique; Robertinho do Recife; Ângela Matos; Val Martins	4:05
10.	"Dona Girafa"	Rubens Alexandre	4:00
11.	"Previsão do Tempo (Sol ou Chuva)"	Sullivan; Massadas	3:16
12.	"Passatempo"	Michel Bijou; Guilherme Jr.	3:04
13.	"Estrelinha"	Sullivan; Massadas	3:33
14.	"Alerta"	César Costa Filho	3:50
Total length:			51:57

== Personnel ==
- Produced: Michael Sullivan and Paulo Massadas
- Artistic Coordination: Max Pierre
- Photos: André Wanderley
- Studio Assistants and Mixing: Cezar Barbosa, Ivan Carvalho, Sergio Rocha, Marquinhos, Julio Martins, Alexandre Ribas
- Recording and mixing engineer: Jorge 'Gordo' Guimarães
- Graphic Coordination: Marciso Pena Carvalho
- Recorded in the studios: Acronym
- Editing and Editing: Jorge 'Gordo' Guimarães
- Creation and Illustrations: Reinaldo Waisman
- Additional engineers (Free Sound): Edu, Luiz Paulo, D'Orey, Mario Jorge, Beto Vaz, Célio Martins

== Certifications ==
Region	Certification	Certified units/sales
Brazil (Pro-Música Brasil)	2× Diamond	2,000,000^{‡}
^{‡} Sales+streaming figures based on certification alone.

== See also ==
- List of best-selling albums in Brazil
- List of best-selling Latin albums
