= Xuxa Dance =

Studio album by Xuxa
- Released: November 28, 1996
- Recorded: 1996
- Genre: Dance-pop
- Length: 47:19
- Label: Polygram; Mercury
- Producer: Christian de Walden; Max di Carlo

Xuxa chronology
El Pequeño Mundo (1994)	Xuxa Dance (1996)	El Mundo és de los Dos (1999)

Singles from Xuxa Dance
- 1. "Los Amigos de Mis Amigas Son Mis Amigos" Released: 1996; 2. "Yo Te Doy Mi Corazon" Released: 1997; 3. "Esto de Quererte" Released: 1997; 4. "Querido Professor" Released: 1997; 5. "Magia Total" Released: 1997

Xuxa Dance is the 17th studio album and the fifth in Spanish by the Brazilian recording artist Xuxa. It was produced by Christian de Walden and released on November 28, 1996, by PolyGram in Latin America and Mercury Records in the United States.

== Production ==
After the release of her fourth Spanish-language studio album El Pequeño Mundo (1994), Polygram decided to bet on an album completely different from the Xuxa's previous one. This time, the label wanted her to sing for the audience that had grown up with her. At the label's request, the Italian composer and producer Christian de Walden began writing some songs for the project with Max di Carlo and Graciela Carballo, who had worked with Xuxa since her first Spanish album, Xuxa 1.

The recordings for Xuxa Dance were made in July 1996 at the Flamingo Café Recording Studio in Miami, Florida (USA), produced by Christian de Walden and Max di Carlo and co-produced by Walter Clissen. Xuxa recorded 14 songs for the project, and only two did not enter the final selection. Along with the project in Spanish, Xuxa recorded the Christmas music "Amém", performed in several of the presenter's specials, and later recorded for XSPB 9 – Magical Christmas (2009). All material was recorded within two weeks.

Initially, the album was to be released in September, scheduled for the premiere of a new Xuxa show on Telefé, an Argentine broadcaster. With the uncertainty of the project, the album was postponed to November. The album label was different in some countries. There are three different versions: green, pink and white. The recordings of the music videos of "Los Amigos de Mis Amigas Son Mis Amigos" and "Esto de Quererte" also took place in Miami.

The work is composed basically of dance/electronic music, a few ballads and a cover version of "Ilarié" which is nothing more than a remix with re-recorded vocals.

== Release and reception ==
Professional ratings
Review scores
Source	Rating
AllMusic	3/5 stars

Xuxa Dance was released at the end of 1996 in Latin America and United States, In Argentine in November reached ninth place among the most sold and the following month occupied the third position behind the albums Tango by Julio Iglesias and Tropimatch by the actor Sergio "EI Lobizon Del Oeste". In February 1997, Xuxa Dance had already won gold in Argentina, according to Billboard magazine.

In addition to Argentina, Xuxa Dance was released in Mexico shortly after, and in the U.S., where it had a performed slightly better than its predecessor, El Pequeño Mundo, but not enough to be a hit.

== Promotion ==
To promote the album, Xuxa participated in several TV and radio programs, as well as giving interviews to newspapers and magazines in Argentina, Chile and the United States. The album's advertisement was broadcast throughout Latin America and the USA.

In mid-1996, during a Disney World 25th anniversary event, Xuxa participated in the Argentine program Hola Susana, presented by Susana Gimenez. In addition to an interview talking about the album, Xuxa sang the song "Querido Professor".

Two songs had music videos, "Los Amigos de Mis Amigas Son Mis Amigos" and "Esto de Quererte", both recorded in Miami in April 1997. Months later, Xuxa recorded a new version of the video of "Los Amigos" with Paquitas at Pink House, her old mansion in Rio de Janeiro, for a TV show.

In August 1997, Polygram released the South Beats compilation which included the remix version of "Yo te Doy mi Corazón".

In December 1997, Xuxa participated in a festival in Argentina where she sang songs from the album.

== Track list ==
Xuxa Dance – Standard edition
No.	Title	Writer(s)	Producers	Length
1.	"Magia Total"	Max di Carlo; Christian de Walden; Graciela Carballo	Max di Carlo; Christian de Walden	3:58
2.	"Querido Professor"	Max di Carlo; Christian de Walden; Graciela Carballo	Max di Carlo; Christian de Walden	4:00
3.	"Esto de Quererte"	Max di Carlo; Christian de Walden; Graciela Carballo	Max di Carlo; Christian de Walden	4:26
4.	"Los Amigos de Mis Amigas Son Mis Amigos"	J. M. Bravo; C. D. France	Max di Carlo; Christian de Walden	3:40
5.	"Un Beso"	Max di Carlo; Christian de Walden; Graciela Carballo	Max di Carlo; Christian de Walden	3:53
6.	"Pesadilla"	Max di Carlo; Christian de Walden; Graciela Carballo	Max di Carlo; Christian de Walden	3:56
7.	"Alas Doradas"	Max di Carlo; Christian de Walden; Graciela Carballo	Max di Carlo; Christian de Walden	3:20
8.	"Como Hacen los Campeones"	Max di Carlo; Christian de Walden; Graciela Carballo	Max di Carlo; Christian de Walden	3:57
9.	"Ilarié" (Remix)	Cid Guerreiro; Dito; Ceinha; Versão: Cristina Larraura	Max di Carlo; Christian de Walden	4:02
10.	"Maníaca"	Max di Carlo; Christian de Walden; Graciela Carballo	Max di Carlo; Christian de Walden	3:47
11.	"Alguien Igual que Tú"	Max di Carlo; Christian de Walden; Graciela Carballo	Max di Carlo; Christian de Walden	4:11
12.	"Yo te Doy mi Corazón"	Max di Carlo; Christian de Walden; Graciela Carballo	Max di Carlo; Christian de Walden	3:48
Total length:				47:19

== Personnel ==
- Photos: André Schiliró
- Costume designer: Xuxa, Fabiana Kherlakian
- Recorded at: Flamingo Café Recording Studios; Studio City, Hollywood Studios S.R.L.; Enterprise Studios
- Hair and make-up: Mauro Freire
- Mastering: Brian Gardner
- Production: Christian de Walden, Max di Carlo
- Graphic design: Patrícia Chueke, Ge Alves Pinto
- Co-production: Walter Clissen

== Certifications ==
Region	Certification	Certified units/sales
Argentina (CAPIF)	2× Platinum	120,000^{^}
^{^} Shipments figures based on certification alone.

== Release history ==
Region	Date	Label	Format
Argentine	1996	CD; K7	Polygram; Mercury
Chile	1996	CD	Polygram; Mercury
Spain	1996	CD	Polygram; Mercury
United States	1996	CD	Polygram; Mercury
Venezuela	1996	CD	Polygram; Mercury
