= Xuxa 2 =

Studio album by Xuxa
- Released: April 25, 1991
- Recorded: 1990–1991
- Genre: Latin pop; children's music
- Length: 39:20
- Label: BMG
- Producer: Michael Sullivan; Paulo Massadas

Xuxa chronology
Xuxa (Shusha) (1989)	Xuxa 2 (1991)	Xuxa 3 (1992)

Singles from Xuxa 2
- 1. "Chindolele" Released: July 20, 1991; 2. "Luna de Cristal" Released: December 14, 1991; 3. "Loquita Por ti" Released: August 22, 1992; 4. "El Milagro de la Vida" Released: 1992

Xuxa 2 is the eighth studio album and the second in Spanish language Brazilian recording artist Xuxa. The album was released on April 25, 1991, by BMG. The songs had already been released months before the international programs began. The album marks Xuxa's entry into Latin American television, offering a program in Spanish.

== Production ==
The album was produced by Michael Sullivan and Paulo Massadas with artistic coordination by Max Pierre and Marlene Mattos. The repertoire selection was made by Xuxa, Mattos and Sullivan. The recordings were made at the Som Livre studio in Los Angeles.

Like the previous album, Xuxa consists of some hits from the Spanish-language TV presenter such as "Tindolelê" ("Chindolele"), "Hada Madrina" ("Dinda Ou Dindinha"), "I Love You Xuxu" and "Luna de Cristal" "("Lua de Cristal"). The song "El milagro de la vida" was the opening theme of the Argentine telenovela El árbol azul, which was shown between 1991 and 1992 by El Trece.

The cover of "Xuxa 2" was chosen in August 1990, before the album was even recorded. The recordings of the album did not begin until October of that same year (then, there was no photographic essay for the album "Xuxa 2" and Xou da Xuxa Seis but a reuse of the essay for Xuxa 5), including, the photographer Paulo Rocha is credited to all 3 albums. For that, in the cover of the Xou album of the Xou da Xuxa Seis, it appears in the lower left corner of the cover, it owns a Brazilian flag, to inform the consumers that is the Portuguese version of the album.

== Release and reception ==
The album was distributed internationally by Globo Records and released on April 25, 1991, in Latin America, the United States and some European countries, such as Spain, by RCA Records.

Xuxa reached the seventh position in the ranking Billboard Latin Pop Albums on July 27, 1991, during 27 consecutive weeks the album was among the best sellers.

On April 28, 1991, to promote the album, Xuxa participated in the L.A Fiesta Broadway festival. On the occasion, Xuxa sang "Loquita Por Ti", "Chindolele", and "Luna de Cristal". Also, she sang "Arco Iris", "Ilarié" and "Danza de Xuxa", from her previous album in Spanish, "Xuxa", too.

The album sold 350,000 units in Argentina and 700,000 worldwide.

== Track listing ==
No.	Title	Writer(s)	Length
1.	"Chindolele"	Cid Guerreiro; Dito; Ceinha	4:04
2.	"Hada Madrina (Haz de Cuenta)"	Osmar Osman; Hélio Makumba	3:37
3.	"Tren Fantasma"	Michael Sullivan; Paulo Massadas	4:38
4.	"Lectura"	Mazinho Turle; Dilson Gunane; Barney	3:18
5.	"Alerta"	César Costa Filho; Sérgio Fonseca; Reinaldo Weisman	4:04
6.	"I Love You Xuxu"	Michael Sullivan; Paulo Massadasbbb	4:01
7.	"Loquita Por Tí"	Cid Guerreiro; Dito	3:23
8.	"Crocki, Crocki"	Rubens Alexandre	3:18
9.	"Luna de Cristal"	Michael Sullivan; Paulo Massadas	4:22
10.	"El Milagro de la Vida"	Michael Sullivan; Paulo Massadas	4:00
Total length:			39:20

== Personnel ==
- Produced: Michael Sullivan and Paulo Massadas
- Artistic Coordination: Max Pierre, Marlene Mattos
- Selection of repertoire: Xuxa, Marlene Mattos, Michael Sullivan
- Art Direction in Spanish: Graciela Carballo
- Spanish Art Direction: Maria Haydeé, Ester Piro
- Voice recording of the adult choir: Graciela Carballo
- Artistic Coordination: Helio Costa Manso
- Technicians of additional recordings: Luis Paulo, Marcos Caminha
- Recorded at the studios: Som Livre (Los Angeles)
- Engineer of choir recording and mixing in Spanish: Moogie Canazio
- Musical Direction for Choir: Kenny O Brien
- Studio Assistants and Mixing: Marcelo Serôdio, Julio Carneiro Cláudio Oliveira, Cesar Barbosa, Ivan Carvalho, Mauro Moraes
- Recording and mixing engineer: Jorge Gordo Guimarães, Luis Guilherme D Orey.

== Charts ==
=== Chart positions ===
Year	Chart	Position
1991	Argentina (CAPIF)	1
1991	USA (Billboard Latin Pop Albums)	7
1991	Puerto Rico Cashbox (Puerto Rico Latin LPs)	28
1991	USA Cashbox (Miami Latin Top Albums)	24

=== Single ===
Year	Chart	Single	Best Position	Ref.
1991	Hot Latin Songs	Chindolele	10	
1991	Hot Latin Songs	Loquita Por Ti	29	
1991	Hot Latin Songs	Luna De Cristal	35	
