= Xou da Xuxa 3 =

Studio album by Xuxa
- Released: June 30, 1988
- Recorded: 1988
- Genres: Pop; Children's music
- Length: 53:25
- Label: Som Livre
- Producers: Michael Sullivan; Paulo Massadas

Xuxa chronology
Xegundo Xou da Xuxa (1987)	Xou da Xuxa 3 (1988)	4º Xou da Xuxa (1989)

Singles from Xou da Xuxa 3
- 1. "Ilariê" Released: 1988; 2. "Brincar de Índio" Released: 1988; 3. "Arco-Íris" Released: 1988; 4. "Abecedário da Xuxa" Released: 1988; 5. "Dança da Xuxa" Released: 1988

Xou da Xuxa 3 (English: Xuxa's Show 3) is the fourth studio album by Brazilian recording artist Xuxa. It was released on June 30, 1988, by Som Livre. Xuxa' best-selling album, has sold over 5 million copies in Brazil, making it the best-selling brazilian albums of all time, as well as the best-selling album by a female artist in the country.

The album, which featured hits like "Arco-íris", "Abecedário da Xuxa", "Brincar de Índio" and especially "Ilariê" that became the most famous song of Xuxa until today, became the most expressive album in Latin American sales at the time. The song "Ilariê" was in 1st place for 20 weeks in the Brazilian charts, being the most performed song in the radios along with "Faz Parte do Meu Show" of Cazuza. According to Jornal do Brasil, with data from Nelson Oliveira Pesquisas de Mercado, at the time the album reached number one on the list of best selling albums.

== Background and production ==
A children's programs most successful Brazilian television history, the Xou da Xuxa was a game show hosted by Xuxa. His first appearance as host of TV was in the Clube da Criança, directed by Maurice Sherman in 1983 in Rede Manchete. Sherman was responsible for the discovery of Xuxa on television.

Since their first LP in Som Livre, Xou da Xuxa of 1986, presenter and now singer became a phonograph phenomenon. At Christmas 1986, Xuxa received his eighth Platinum record, award granted every 250,000 copies sold in Brazil. The album hit the mark more than two million copies, reaching the South American record sales.

Xou da Xuxa 3 was produced by Michael Sullivan, Paulo Massadas, with Max Pierre's artistic coordination, Xuxa's album Xuxa 3 was recorded at the SIGLA (Som Livre) studios and the LP was manufactured by BMG Ariola (RCA Records).

The process of selecting the songs was mandated by the screening of Xuxa's manager, Marlene Mattos, who listened to about 200 compositions sent from all over the country before separating 16. After playing these songs on TV Globo's show and receiving the opinion of students of public schools in the form of notes, Xou da Xuxa 3 left with 14 songs among them "Arco-iris", theme of the film Super Xuxa Contra Baixo Astral, "Ilariê", its greater commercial success, and "Brincar de Índio" besides the "Abecedário da Xuxa", specially recorded to play on the TV for the deaf and dumb.

== Release ==
Xou da Xuxa 3 was released on June 30, 1988 by Som Livre, in CD, cassette and LP formats. The album was the first of Xuxa to be released on CD, and was reissued on CD in 1989 in Israel, reissued on CD and cassette in Brazil in 1996, and on CD in 2006. In 2013, Som Livre in partnership with Xuxa Productions, launched Xou's collection of Xuxa + Untitled CD Fans Selection, a box with all 7 albums released at the time of the program, and with it a CD with unpublished songs, chosen by fans of the hostess.

== Commercial performance ==
Xou da Xuxa 3 release, Xuxa has once again become a big seller of albums throughout Brazil, the album has become the most successful of its career, selling more than 5 million copies as of 2016. According to the Jornal do Brasil, with data from Nelson Oliveira Pesquisa e Estudo de Mercado (Nopem), debuted atop on the list of best selling albums in Brazil in its first week. It became the best-selling brazilian albums of all time, as well as the best-selling album by a female artist in the country and is also the best selling album in the history of the record company Som Livre. Shes is listed by the Guinness World Records as having the "Best-selling children's album of all time".

"Ilariê" topped the Brazilian radio in 1988 for twenty weeks and became the longest-running number-one single, with "Faz Parte do Meu Show", by Cazuza. "Ilariê" has been recorded in 80 dialects over the years, the English and Spanish language version being Xuxa itself, as well as a Chinese version interpreted by the Taiwanese trio i.n.g in 2006 as "健 健美".

== Track listing ==
Xou da Xuxa 3
No.	Title	Writer(s)	Length
1.	"Ilariê"	Cid Guerreiro; Dito; Ceinha	05:41
2.	"Bombom"	Michael Sullivan; Paulo Massadas	04:23
3.	"O Praga É Uma Praga"	Reinaldo Waisman; Michel Bijou	03:40
4.	"Xuxerife"	Waisman; Alexandre Agra; Fred Nascimento; Guilherme Jr.	02:55
5.	"Beijinhos Estalados"	Lincoln Olivetti; Claudia Olivetti	05:03
6.	"Coração Criança"	Sullivan; Massadas	04:07
7.	"Brincar de Índio"	Sullivan; Massadas	04:22
8.	"Dança da Xuxa"	Prentice; Ronaldo Monteiro de Souza	03:24
9.	"Eu Não"	Dani; Luiz Otávio	02:38
10.	"Abecedário da Xuxa"	César Costa Filho; Souza	03:38
11.	"Arco-íris"	Sullivan; Massadas; Ana Penido	04:36
12.	"Apolo"	Sullivan; Massadas	04:07
13.	"Viver"	Neuma Morais; Neon Morais	04:51
Total length:			53:25

== Personnel ==
- Produced by: Michael Sullivan and Paulo Massdas
- Artistic coordination: Max Pierre
- Recording and mixing engineer: Jorge "Gordo" Guimarães
- Additional engineers (Free Sound): Luiz Paulo, Edu, D'Orey, Mario Jorge and Beto Vaz (studio Mix) Andy Mills, João Damasceno and Paulo Henrique
- Studio Assistants (Sound Free): Sergio Rocha, Ivan Carvalho, Marcelo, Serodio, Marquinhos, Cezar Barbosa, Billy, Octavio "Chambinho", Alexandre Ribas, Julio Martins, Julio Carneiro, Claudio Oliveira, Marcos André, Loba and Marcio Barros
- Regimentation: Jorge CorreaEdition - Ieddo Gouvea
- Back Vocals: The Paquitas (Ana Paula Guimarães, Anna Paula Almeida, Priscila Couto, Tatiana Maranhão, Roberta Cipriani, Andréia Faria, Louise Wischermann)

== Certifications ==
Region	Certification	Certified units/sales
Brazil (Pro-Música Brasil)	3× Diamond	3,000,000^{‡}
^{‡} Sales+streaming figures based on certification alone.

== See also ==
- List of best-selling albums in Brazil
- List of best-selling Latin albums
