= Xou da Xuxa Seis =

Studio album by Xuxa
- Released: June 12, 1991
- Genres: Pop; children's music
- Length: 48:54
- Label: Som Livre
- Producers: Max Pierre; Michael Sullivan; Paulo Massadas

Xuxa chronology
Xuxa 5 (1990)	Xou da Xuxa Seis (1991)	Xou da Xuxa Sete (1992)

Singles from Xou da Xuxa Seis
- 1. "Hoje é Dia de Folia" Released: 1991; 2. "O Xou da Xuxa Começou" Released: 1991; 3. "Novo Planeta" Released: 1991; 4. "Dança do Coco" Released: 1991

Xou da Xuxa Seis (English: Xuxa's Show Six) is the ninth studio album by Brazilian recording artist Xuxa Meneghel, released on September 12, 1991, by Som Livre. This album was the sixth album in the "Xou da Xuxa" collection, which totals seven. In this album are included songs like "O Xou da Xuxa Começou", "Novo Planeta" and "Hoje é Dia de Folia". The album sold more than 1 million copies.

== Production ==
The studio album contains two re-recordings of international songs: "Não Basta", a version of "No Basta" by the Venezuelan singer and composer Franco De Vita and "Bom Dia", which was recorded years before by the country duo Chitãozinho and Xororó.

A great curiosity of the album, is that the song "Hoje é Dia de Folia", had its first chorus cut due to lack of space in the LP (being of the duration of 3:15), the integral version of the song, was only launched in the third official Brazilian compilation of Xuxa, the Pérolas (with the duration of 4:16).

Contrary to popular belief, Xou da Xuxa Seis chosen photos for the cover and back cover of Xuxa Seis are from the rehearsal for the studio album Xuxa 5 (1990). These same photos were even published in the international magazine Paula in October 1990.

So that the public did not confuse with its album in Spanish language Xuxa 2 that had been released shortly before and had the same cover, was inserted a Brazilian flag in the cover of Xuxa Seis.

Xou da Xuxa Seis was produced by Max Pierre, Michael Sullivan and Paulo Massadas, with artistic coordination Marlene Mattos and Xuxa.

== Release and reception ==
Xou da Xuxa Seis released on September 12, 1991, by Som Livre, in CD, cassette and LP formats. The album sold more than a million copies in Brazil, the second with less sales of Xuxa's Xou collection. In 1992, was launched in Uruguay in cassette version, but without authorization, being a bootleg. The album was reissued in 2013 by Som Livre in partnership with Xuxa Produções. The disc is part of the collection box Xou da Xuxa.

== Promotion ==
In addition to singing the songs in the television program, Rede Globo's programming featured an album commercial in two versions: one of 15 and another of 30 seconds. In fact, this commercial was starring actress Deborah Secco. Posters announcing the release of the album were spread across several cities in Brazil. Xuxa also toured Brazil and international based on the Xou Seis and Xuxa 91.

== Track listing ==
Xou da Xuxa Seis – LP and cassette edition
No.	Title	Writer(s)	Length
1.	"O Xou da Xuxa Começou"	Dido de Oliveira	4:19
2.	"Dança do Coco"	Augusto Cezar; Carlos Colla	3:15
3.	"Planeta Terra"	Carlão; Victor Cezar de Andrade	4:05
4.	"Quem Sabe um Dia"	Torquato Mariano; Claudio Rabello	4:11
5.	"Bom Dia"	Mário Marcos	4:52
6.	"Não Basta (No Basta)"	Franco de Vita; Versão: Biafra	4:38
7.	"Hoje é Dia de Folia"	Nando Cordel	3:15
8.	"A Dança do Paloê"	Fafy Siqueira; Sarah P. Benchimol	4:25
9.	"Novo Planeta"	Zé Henrique; Marcelo Azevedo; Marcelo Faria; Val Martins; Renato Terra; Angel Mattos	4:40
10.	"A Fã nº 1"	Michael Sullivan; Paulo Massadas	4:20
11.	"Meu Cachorrinho Pimpo"	Fred Goes; Guilherme Maia	4:02
12.	"Nana Caxuxa"	Arnaldo; Mônica Freitas	4:35
Total length:			50:37

Xou da Xuxa Seis – Cassette and CD re-release
No.	Title	Writer(s)	Length
7.	"Xuxa Café"	Ed Wilson; Carlos Pedro	3:45
Total length:			54:22

== Personnel ==
- Produced: Max Pierre, Michael Sullivan and Paulo Massadas
- Artistic Coordination: Marlene Mattos and Xuxa Meneghel
- Recording Technician: Jorge 'Gordo' Guimarães (bases and keyboards), Luiz G. D 'Orey
- Studio Assistants and Mixing: Cezar Barbosa, Ivan Carvalho, Roberta Rodrigues, Julio Carneiro, Claudio Oliveira and Sergio Rocha
- Mixing: Jorge 'Gordo' Guimarães
- Photos: Paulo Rocha
- Arrangement: Jorge 'Jorginho' Corrêa
- Illustration (insert): Reinaldo Waisman
- Edition of tape: Jorge 'Gordo' Guimarães
- Costume Designer: Sandra Bandeira
- Recorded in the studios: Som Livre (Rio de Janeiro)
- Hair: Márcia Elias
- Musician: Roberto Fernandes

== Certifications ==
Certifications for "Xou da Xuxa Seis"
Region	Certification	Certified units/sales
Brazil (Pro-Música Brasil)	3× Platinum	750,000^{‡}
^{‡} Sales+streaming figures based on certification alone.
