= Xuxa 5 =

Studio album by Xuxa
- Released: August 1, 1990
- Recorded: 1990
- Genre: Children's music
- Length: 50:01
- Label: Som Livre
- Producers: Michael Sullivan; Paulo Massadas

Xuxa chronology
4º Xou da Xuxa (1989)	Xuxa 5 (1990)	Xou da Xuxa Seis (1991)

Singles from Xuxa 5
- 1. "Pinel Por Você" Released: 1990; 2. "Lua de Cristal" Released: 1990; 3. "Leitura" Released: 1990; 4. "Boto Rosa" Released: 1990

Xuxa 5 is the seventh studio album by Brazilian recording artist Xuxa Meneghel. It was released on August 1, 1990, by Som Livre. It was the fifth album in the series Xou de Xuxa. The best-known songs from this album are "Pinel Por Você", "Trem Fantasma" and mainly "Lua de Cristal". The album sold more than 1.8 million copies in Brazil.

== Production ==
In Xuxa 5, it is possible to notice a certain maturation of the production of the Xuxa albums. Without leaving aside what the public liked in the other four previous albums of the series Xou da Xuxa, the album brings influences of other rhythms like lambada that was the great fashion of the time.

There were 20 songs recorded for the album, but only 13 were chosen for the tracklist. Among those discarded was the "Direito dos Baixinhos", which was sung in the Xuxa Xou's special XV.

"Lua de Cristal", the biggest hit on the album and the second largest in Xuxa's career, was composed primarily as the theme song for the film. Xuxa liked it so much that she decided to include it in the album. "Pinel Por Você", another highlight track, was the last composition of Cid Guerrero for Xuxa that became hit.

The Children's Queen always worried about passing messages on her records, she wanted children to learn something by listening to her songs. In "Cobra, Chapéu e Palito", the singer teaches the difference between accents. Already in "Leitura", as its title says, was composed to encourage children to read more books. In addition to "O Boto Rosa" that talks about nature.

Xuxa 5 was produced in partnership with the double Michael Sullivan and Paulo Massadas, with artistic coordination Max Pierre and Aramis Barros. It was recorded in the studios of Som Livre.

== Release and reception ==
Xuxa 5 was released on August 1, 1990, by Som Livre in CD, cassette and LP formats. The album reaching rapid popularity thanks to "Lua de Cristal" song recorded by Xuxa, and theme eponymous film released together. In 1991, the album was released in Argentina on tape, but without authorization, being a bootleg. "Lua de Cristal" reached #1 in the official parade of Brazil, and its Spanish language version reached 35 position in the Top Latin Pop Songs Chart of Billboard, staying for seven consecutive weeks. With only LP Xuxa 5 sales and their first album in Spanish, the host earned 2.7 million dollars in an interval of two years, according to the Brazilian magazine Veja. The album sold 1.8 million copies in Brazil, being certified platinum by Associação Brasileira de Produtores de Discos (ABPD).

Xuxa 5 was re-released in 1995 and 1996 on K7 and CD, in 2006 on CD re-released in celebration of Xuxa's 20 years on Globo Network. Has the same catalog number from the other versions, but different barcode and art. In 2013 was relaunched by Som Livre in partnership with Xuxa Produções. The disc is part of the collection box Xou da Xuxa.

== Promotion ==
Almost all the songs on the album were performed on the program, but "Lua de Cristal", "Pinel Por Você" and "Trem Fantasma" were the most worked.

Only three songs from the album have garnered music videos in their release phase. "Pinel Por Você" a video screened by Fantástico (Fantastic), "O Boto Rosa" a video shown in Xou da Xuxa and "Lua de Cristal", two videos: one in the Christmas special of 1990 and another in the program.

To promote the album, the Xuxa 90 tour took place in Brazil, including Rio de Janeiro, São Paulo, Recife and Belo Horizonte, as well as performances in countries such as Paraguay and Chile.

== Track listing ==
Xuxa 5 – LP, Cassette and CD edition
No.	Title	Writer(s)	Length
1.	"Pinel Por Você"	Cid Guerreiro; Dito	03:26
2.	"Tempero da Lambada"	Michael Sullivan; Paulo Massadas	03:50
3.	"Trem Fantasma"	Sullivan; Massadas	04:39
4.	"Cobra, Chapéu e Palito"	Prêntice; Ronaldo Monteiro de Souza	03:58
5.	"É Ou Não É"	Cláudia Olivetti; Lincoln Olivetti	03:59
6.	"Lua de Cristal"	Sullivan; Massadas	04:20
7.	"I Love You Xuxu"	Sullivan; Massadas	04:03
8.	"Canja de Galinha"	Mazinho Turle; Dilson Gunane-Barney	03:42
9.	"Twistxuxa"	Zé Henrique; Angela Mattos; Marcelo Faria; Marcello Azevedo; Val Martins	02:51
10.	"Copa na Floresta"	Rubens Alexandre	04:08
11.	"Vem Lambaxuxa"	Aramis Barros; Ary Sperling	03:34
12.	"Leitura"	Mazinho Turle; Dilson Gunane-Barney	03:16
13.	"O Boto Rosa"	Prêntice; Ronal Monteiro de Souza	04:14
Total length:			41:50

== Personnel ==
- Produced: Michael Sullivan and Paulo Massadas
- Studio Assistants and Mixing: Marcelo Serodio, Julio Martins, Felipe Leite, Marquinho, Sergio Rocha, Ivan Machado and Billy
- Recorded in the studios: Som Livre
- Arrangement: Jorge 'Jorginho' Corrêa
- Edition of tape: Jorge 'Gordo' Guimarães
- Cover and Ente: Xuxa Meneghel and Reinaldo Waisman
- Photos: Paulo Rocha
- Costume Designer: Sandra Bandeira
- Hairdresser: Márcia Elias
- Musician: Roberto Fernandes
- Graphic Coordination: Marciso 'Pena' Carvalho
- Artistic Coordination: Max Pierre and Aramis Barros
- Recording Technician: Jorge 'Gordo' Guimarães and Luiz Guilherme D 'Orey
- Technicians of additional recordings: Luiz Paulo, Marcos Caminha and Jorge Teixeira
- Mixing Technicians: Jorge 'Gordo' Guimarães

== Certifications ==
Region	Certification	Certified units/sales
Brazil (Pro-Música Brasil)	Diamond	1,000,000^{‡}
^{‡} Sales+streaming figures based on certification alone.
