= Sexto Sentido (Xuxa album) =

Studio album by Xuxa
- Released: August 20, 1994
- Recorded: 1994
- Genres: Dance-pop; teen pop; children's
- Length: 56:50
- Label: Som Livre
- Producer: Michael Sullivan

Xuxa chronology
Xuxa (1993)	Sexto Sentido (1994)	Luz no Meu Caminho (1995)

Singles from Sexto Sentido
- 1. "Hey DJ" Released: 1994; 2. "É de Chocolate" Released: 1994; 3. "Pipoca" Released: 1994; 4. "Jogo da Rima" Released: 1994; 5. "Rir é o Melhor Remédio" Released: 1994; 6. "Grito de Guerra" Released: 1994

Sexto Sentido (English: Sixth Sense) is the fourteenth studio album by Brazilian recording artist Xuxa. It was released on August 20, 1994, by Som Livre.

Aimed at the children's audience, it was the first record of the presenter to win a title of their own, without depending on the programs presented by Xuxa as happened with the previous albums. Sexto Sentido sold more than 1 million copies, it was later certified diamond by Pro-Música Brasil (PMB).

== Production and songs ==
After a period full of international projects that were interrupted by a column problem, Xuxa began the year of 1994 decided that it would return to invest in the Brazilian public. The new program in Rede Globo gradually shaped itself and soon after, a new album began to be developed as well.

Xuxa's audience had been growing. Many of the children who accompanied her in the days of the Xou da Xuxa were already entering their adolescence and thus the need arose to produce a disc that could please all the age groups. In this way, Xuxa would continue conquering the children's public, but without leaving aside the public that consecrated it like Queen. The album features lyrics and more mature arrangements than previous releases. We have as an example the song "Hey DJ" in which the blonde bet on the funk from Rio that gained evidence in that period, already in "Dança Nas Estrelas" the romantic pop and "Happy-py" the bet on reggae sharing the vocals with Carlinhos Brown.

According to the controversial book Sonho de Paquitas (Dream of Paquitas), released in 1995, Popcorn was recorded for a play that Xuxa would do that year. The idea of recording the song came by chance. In an interview at the time, the blonde told that it was during a chat in her house with her businesswoman of the time, Marlene Mattos and composers Álvaro Socci and Cláudio Matta, until she commented on the desire that was to eat popcorn and soon then returned from the kitchen with several pots full of popcorn. Half-embarrassed, the composers said they had written a song that talked about candy. Xuxa was curious, they showed the song and she decided to record.

Sexto Sentido was the first record to win a title that was not the same as a Xuxa program and the first to be developed without the intention of using the tracks as a soundtrack on TV. The explanation of the title is due to a curious fact. When the hostess recorded the song "Sexto Sentido", a fan told that she had dreamed she'd put that title on the album and found it interesting. It is worth remembering that throughout the process of selection of repertoire, Xuxa and his team choose the songs through intuition, another reason that made this name for the album.

Sexto Sentido was produced by Michael Sullivan, had Artistic Direction by Aramis Barros and Artistic coordination by Marlene Mattos and Xuxa, recorded at the Som Livre studios.

== Release and reception ==
Sexto Sentido was released on August 20, 1994, in CD, cassette and LP formats, The album was also re-released on CD in 1996, 2001 and 2006. Becoming a sales success, remaining 18 weeks among the TOP 10. It was later certified diamond by Pro-Música Brasil (PMB) for selling 1 million copies.

== Promotion ==
The release of the Sexto Sentido began with the debut of the Xuxa Park program in June 1994. The re-recording of "É de Chocolate" began to serve as the opening theme of the attraction and performed in the last block and "Só Falta Você" was performed shortly after the messages of Good Morning. Cry of War that was specially composed for the program, was the unique song to be sung in all the seasons of the Xuxa Park. In addition to the performances, were music videos of the songs "Pipoca", "Hey DJ", "Sexto Sentido", "Dança da Bananeira", "Rir é o Melhor Remédio (Gargalhada)" and "Muito Prazer, Eu Existo". Initially, all tracks on the disc would win music videos.

The second stage of disclosure begins on August 21, 1994, when Xuxa presents the album in the program Domingão do Faustão. 2 days later a show was performed at the Imperator house in Rio de Janeiro to present the album.

In September, Xuxa gave interviews to the main Brazilian radio stations and shortly thereafter performed a mini-tour in nightclubs in São Paulo to promote the album. On October 7, 1994, the Sexto Sentido tour finally kicks off at the Olympia concert hall in São Paulo. The tour lasted until June 1996.

== Track listing ==
Sexto Sentido – LP, Cassette and CD edition
No.	Title	Writer(s)	Length
1.	"Hey DJ"	Michael Sullivan; Aloysio Reis	4:26
2.	"Compasso do Amor"	Carlinhos Brown	4:03
3.	"É de Chocolate"	Augusto Cesar; Carlos Colla	5:00
4.	"Pipoca"	Cesar Borg Angel; Cid Guerreiro	3:26
5.	"Jogo da Rima (The Name Game)"	Shirley Ellis; Lincon Chase Vs.:Zé Henrique; Ângela Mattos; Marcelo Faria	5:50
6.	"Sexto Sentido"	Michael Sullivan; Paulo Massadas	5:18
7.	"Dança Nas Estrelas"	Dido Oliveira	4:17
8.	"Dança da Bananeira"	Cid Guerreiro	3:27
9.	"Só Falta Você"	Reinaldo Waisman; Afo Verde; Pablo Durand	3:25
10.	"Rir é o Melhor Remédio (Gargalhada)"	Prêntice; Ronaldo Monteiro de Souza; Marcos Fabiano	3:39
11.	"Happy-py" (featuring Carlinhos Brown)	Michael Sullivan; Paulo Massadas; Ana Penido	4:20
12.	"Forró da Cachorrada"	Marcos Valle; Claudio Rabello; M. Pierre	3:58
13.	"Muito Prazer, Eu Existo"	Álvaro Socci; Cláudio Matta	4:00
Total length:			56:50

Sexto Sentido – CD re-release
No.	Title	Writer(s)	Length
14.	"Grito de Guerra"	Marcos Valle; Claudio Rabello; M. Pierre	1:32

== Personnel ==
- Produced by: Michael Sullivan
- Art Direction: Aramis Barros
- Artistic Coordination: Marlene Mattos and Xuxa Meneghel
- Recording Technician: Jorge 'Gordo' Guimarães, Luiz G. D 'Orey, Edu Brito and Sergio Rocha
- Production Assistant: Duda Nogueira
- Recorded in the studios: Som Livre
- Makeup Department: Promaster Digital
- Mixing Technicians: Jorge 'Gordo' Guimarães
- Studio Assistants and Mixing: Marcelo Seródio, Julio Carneiro, Mauro Moraes, Ivan Carvalho and Everaldo

== Certifications ==
Region	Certification	Certified units/sales
Brazil (Pro-Música Brasil)	Diamond	1,000,000^{*}
^{*} Sales figures based on certification alone.
