= Xuxa (Shusha) =

Studio album by Xuxa
- Released: November 18, 1989
- Recorded: 1989
- Genre: Latin pop; children's music
- Length: 38:00
- Label: BMG; Som Livre; Globo Records
- Producer: Michael Sullivan; Paulo Massadas; Guto Graça Melo

Xuxa chronology
Xuxa (Shusha) (1989)	Xuxa 2 (1991)

Singles from Xuxa (Shusha)
- 1. "Ilarié" Released: 1989; 2. "Danza de Xuxa" Released: 1990; 3. "Arco Iris" Released: 1990; 4. "Bombón" Released: 1990; 5. "Juguemos a los Indios" Released: 1990

Professional ratings
Review scores
Source	Rating
Allmusic	2/5 stars

Xuxa (also known as Xuxa (Shusha), Xuxa Vol. 1 or Xuxa in Spanish) is the sixth studio album and first Spanish-language album by Brazilian recording artist Xuxa. The album was released internationally on November 18, 1989, in the United States by Globo Records, and in 1990 in Argentina and Latin America by BMG, RCA and Polygram, in Brazil by Som Livre, and in Spain by RCA.

The album sold more than 5,200,000 copies and reached the fourth position of the Billboard Latin Pop Albums chart. Xuxa 1 features versions of major hits such as "Ilarié", "Danza de Xuxa" and "Arco Iris", and led to Xuxa receiving a nomination for Pop New Artist of the Year at the 1990 Lo Nuestro Awards.

== Background ==
The Brazilian singer, TV host and actress Xuxa it became popular in Brazil and other Latin American countries. Her music became a part of El Show de Xuxa, and with the success of the song "Ilariê" beyond Brazil, a compilation of songs from her first three Portuguese albums was re-recorded in Spanish.

Xuxa did not speak Spanish and took a language crash course, with special focus on pronunciation, in order to perform the songs for the album in Spanish. Song lyrics (like the names of the characters in the song "Bombom") were changed to keep the rhyme structure in the songs. The music composition was not rewritten but did experience many changes during the re-mix.

The Spanish album brings together Xuxa's most popular songs, including "Ilariê" ("Ilarié"), "Doce Mel" ("Dulce Miel"), "Arco-Íris" ("Arco Iris"), "Dança da Xuxa" ("Danza de Xuxa"), and "Vamos Brincar de Índio" ("Juguemos a Los Indios").

== Production ==
The album was produced by Michael Sullivan, Paulo Massadas, and Guto Graça Mello, with artistic coordination by Max Pierre and Guto Graça Mello. It was recorded in the studios of Som Livre in Rio de Janeiro.

== Release ==
The album was first released in Argentina, Chile, Mexico and United States on November 18, 1989, by Som Livre and in January 1990 in Ecuador, Portugal, Spain, Venezuela and other countries. In Brazil, the album was launched in August 1990 by Som Livre. In each country, the design of the album cover, back cover, and the album booklet was changed to reflect differences in the song lyrics or data sheet. In some versions, a text on the cover of the album indicated the correct pronunciation of the name of the artist: "Shu-sha".

== Commercial performance ==
Xuxa reached number 4 in the Billboard Latin Pop Albums chart, the album had sold more than 5.2 million copies in ten countries.

== Promotion ==
Beginning the release of the album, on November 18, Xuxa participated in the congress of the Organización de Telecomunicaciones de Iberoamérica (OTI) in Miami (USA). In the marathon of divulging in the country, the singer realized some shows and gave interviews for radios and TV programs. There he received proposals to take his next tour to Latin American countries.

On February 22, 1990, it was the turn to perform at the Viña del Mar International Song Festival in Chile. Xuxa won the top prize of the event and was invited to perform again the next day due to the animation she caused in the audience.

With the release of the album in Europe in October 1990, the Queen of Baixinhos recorded special appearances on TV shows in Spain and Italy, as well as having performed on some of the major Spanish radio stations.

On November 19, in addition to presenting the category of best children's TV program at the Emmy Awards in the US, the presenter sang the single "Danza de Xuxa".

In December, the singer won a special in Argentina shown by Telefé, where she sang some songs from the album.

Throughout 1990, Xuxa participated of programs of TV and radio of diverse Latin countries like Mexico and Uruguay. The Xuxa 90 tour went through Paraguay and Chile with the repertoire changed.

== Track listing ==
No.	Title	Writer(s)	Length
1.	"Ilarié"	Cid Guerreiro; Dito; Ceinha; Cristina Larraura	5:25
2.	"Arco Iris"	Michael Sullivan; Paulo Massadas; Anna Penido; Graciela Carballo	4:35
3.	"Bombón"	Sullivan; Massadas; Carballo	4:10
4.	"Quiero Pan"	Tuza; J. Correia; Carballo	1:52
5.	"Campeón"	L. Robles; C. Rossini; Conceição Azevedo; Carballo	3:43
6.	"Dulce Miel"	Cláudio Rabello; Renato Corrêa; Larraura	3:23
7.	"Danza de Xuxa"	Prêntice; Ronaldo Monteiro de Souza; Carballo	3:26
8.	"Juguemos a los Indios"	Sullivan; Massadas; Larraura	4:32
9.	"Receta de Xuxa"	Arnaldo Freitas; Mônica Freitas; Larraura	3:32
10.	"El Circo"	Prêntice; Paulo C. Barros; Monteiro de Souza; Larraura	3:21
Total length:			53:20

== Personnel ==
- Produced: Michael Sullivan, Paulo Massadas and Guto Graça Mello
- Xuxa's Spanish voice direction: Graciela Carballo
- Recording and mixing technician: Jorge "Gordo" Guimarães
- Studio Assistants Mix: Loba and Marcio Barros
- Recorded at the studios: Som Livre - Rio de Janeiro - Brazil
- Cover: Reinaldo Waisman
- Photography: José Antonio (cover) and André Wanderley (back cover)
- Artistic Coordination: Max Pierre and Guto Graça Mello
- Technicians (Free Sound): Edu, Luiz Paulo, D Orey, Mario Jorge, Beto Vaz and Celio Martins
- Technicians (Studio Mix): Andy Mills, João Damasceno and Paulo Henrique
- Recording and mixing: Jackson Paulino, Marcelo Serodio, Beto Vaz, Cezar Barosa, Sergio Ricardo, Billy, Julinho Martin

== Chart positions ==
Year	Chart	Best positions
1990	USA Billboard Latin Pop Albums	4
1990	USA Hot Latin Songs (Ilarié)	11
1990	Puerto Rico Cash Box Puerto Rico Latin Albums	2
1990	USA Cash Box New York Latin LPs	7
1990	USA Cash Box Los Angeles Latin LPs	11
1990	USA Cash Box Texas Latin LPs	14
1991	Spain Billboard Albums	5
2017	Uruguay Spotify Viral Songs (Ilarié)	5
2022	Iceland Spotify Viral Songs (Ilarié)	2

== Certifications ==
Region	Certification	Sales
United States and Puerto Rico (RRIA)	Platinum	1.000.000
Argentina (CAPIF)	3× Platinum	300.000
Brazil	Platinum	130.437
Chile (IFPI)	8× Platinum	250.000
Spain (Promusicae)	2× Platinum	200.000^{*}
Mexico	—N/a	100.000
Summaries
	—N/a	5.200.000
^ Shipments figures based on certification alone.

== Release history ==
Region	Date	Format	Label	Ref.
Chile	1989	LP; cassette	RCA Records	
United States	1989	CD; cassette	Globo Records	
Argentina	1990	CD; cassette	RCA Records	
Brazil	1990	LP; cassette; CD	Som Livre	
Mexico	1990	Cassette; CD	RCA Records; Globo Records; BMG	
Peru	1990	Cassette	RCA Records	
Portugal	1990	CD	BMG; PolyGram	
Spain	1990	Cassette	RCA Records; BMG	
Venezuela	1990	Cassette	RCA Records	
Colombia	1991	LP	Talento Records	
Costa Rica	1991	LP	Globo Records	
