= Xuxa e Seus Amigos =

Studio album by Xuxa
- Released: November 1985
- Genre: Children's music
- Length: 36:44
- Language: Portuguese
- Labels: Philips (Brazil); Polygram (Argentina)
- Producer: Roberto Menescal

Xuxa chronology
Xuxa e Seus Amigos (1985)	Xou da Xuxa (1986)

Xuxa e Seus Amigos (English: Xuxa and Her Friends) is the debut album by Brazilian recording artist Xuxa Meneghel, and the first solo and containing her stage name, released in November 1985 by Philips in Brazil.

On this album the host sings along with several guests to (Caetano Veloso, Zizi Possi, Marina, Nara Leão, Chico Buarque, Erasmo Carlos, Biquini Cavadão) being honored in some tracks like the track 7, "Xa-Xe-Xi-Xo- Xuxa" sung by the Os Trapalhões that even before the race on TV Globo, showed great charisma for it. The album was produced by Roberto Menescal.

In 1990 was re-released in Argentina by Polygram (now Universal Music), with the title in Spanish: Xuxa Y Sus Amigos.

== Track listing ==
Side A –Standard edition
No.	Title	Writer(s)	Producer(s)	Length
1.	"O Leãozinho" (featuring Caetano Veloso)	Caetano Veloso	Roberto Menescal	3:04
2.	"O Gato" (featuring Marina)	Vinícius de Morais; Bacalov; Toquinho	Roberto Menescal	2:27
3.	"Meu Bumerangue Não Quer Mais Voltar" (featuring Erasmo Carlos)	Roberto Carlos; Erasmo Carlos	Roberto Menescal	3:25
4.	"Irmão Sol, Irmã Lua" (featuring Zizi Possi)	Aécio Flávio; Léo Vitor	Roberto Menescal	3:35
5.	"O Caderno" (featuring Chico Buarque)	Toquinho; Mutinho	Roberto Menescal	2:50
6.	"Pra Mode Chatear" (featuring Nara Leão)	Antonio Carlos Jobim	Roberto Menescal	1:43
Total length:				17:04

Side B –Standard edition
No.	Title	Writer(s)	Producer(s)	Length
1.	"Xa-Xe-Xi-Xo-Xuxa" (Os Trapalhões)	Daniel Azulay	Roberto Menescal	2:59
2.	"Sete Quedas"	Juninho Ferreira	Roberto Menescal	2:55
3.	"No Mundo da Lua" (featuring Biquini Cavadão)	Bruno; Shelk; Miguel; Alvaro	Roberto Menescal	3:01
4.	"Kiddo (Meu Herói Querido)"	Billy Blanco Jr.	Roberto Menescal	4:19
5.	"Delícia" (featuring Ciclone)	Joe; Tavinho Paes	Roberto Menescal	3:51
6.	"Acalanto"	Dorival Caymmi	Roberto Menescal	2:35
Total length:				19:40

== Personnel ==
- Production Director: Roberto Menescal
- Recording Technician: Ary Carvalhaes, Jairo Gualberto, Marcio
- Auxiliary: Barroso, Manoel, Charles, Marquinhos
- Recorded in studios: Polygram - Rio de Janeiro
- Court: Américo
- Cover and Graphic Coordination: Jorge Vianna
- Photos: André Wanderlei
- Mixing: Jairo Gualberto e Marcio
