= Ilariê =

Single by Xuxa

from the album Xou da Xuxa 3
- Released: 1988
- Genre: Latin pop, children's song
- Label: Som Livre
- Songwriters: Cid Guerreiro, Dito, Ceinha
- Producer: Michael Sullivan

Xuxa singles chronology
"Estrela-Guia" (1987)	"Ilariê" (1988)	"Brincar de Índio" (1988)

"Ilariê" is a song recorded by the Brazilian singer Xuxa, released on June 30, 1988 by record company Som Livre as the lead single from her fourth studio album, Xou da Xuxa 3 (1988). "Ilariê" debuted at the top of the Brazilian radio stations, reigning for 20 consecutive weeks.

Ilariê's success has made Xou da Xuxa 3 one of the best-selling album in the history of Brazil, with more than 5 million copies, entering the Guinness World Records as the best-selling children's album in history. The song was recorded in 80 dialects, including a Chinese version recorded by Taiwanese girl group i.n.g.

In addition, the song achieved international success, when it was recorded in Spanish and released outside Brazil in 1989, reaching position #11 on the Billboard's Hot Latin Songs chart.

Also, the song was recorded in English in 1993, translated and composed by the Italian-Brazilian singer Deborah Blando. It was planned to be released on Xuxa's first english album, which never happened. The song was performed several times on Xuxa's American program.

== Charts ==
Chart (1989–1990)	Peak position
Chile (UPI)	1
US Hot Latin Songs	11
