= Som Livre =

Brazilian record label

- Parent company: Sony Music Entertainment
- Founded: March 1969; 57 years ago
- Founder: João Araújo
- Genre: Soundtrack, MPB, Samba, Gospel Music, Sertanejo, Country.
- Country of origin: Brazil
- Location: Rio de Janeiro
- Official website: somlivre.com.br

Som Livre (Portuguese for "Free Sound") is a Brazilian record company that was founded in March 1969 in order to commercialize the soundtracks for TV Globo (its then parent company) soap operas and later expanded to recording studio albums.

Today, Som Livre is Brazil's largest domestic label and was formerly part of Grupo Globo, which is the biggest media conglomerate in Brazil. In November 2020, Globo placed the label up for sale. In April 2021, it was acquired by Sony Music Entertainment (initially for an undisclosed amount, later revealed to be US$ 255 million). The sale was approved by the national competition regulator Cade on 4 November 2021 and was completed on 4 March 2022.

== History ==
Som Livre was founded in March 1969 by music producer João Araújo. It was founded with the purpose of developing and commercializing soap opera soundtracks produced by TV Globo. Its first telenovela soundtrack was O Cafona (1971). Other notable soundtracks produced by the label include O Bem-Amado, O Bofe, O Primeiro Amor (The First Love), O Espigão (The Spike), Corrida do Ouro (The Gold Rush), Os Ossos do Barão (The Bones of the Baron), and O Rebu.

In the early 1970s, the label partnered with Sonopresse, Disques Carrere, and Disques Trema to release music videos in Brazil. In 1974, Som Livre created the "SOMA" label with the intention of developing more affordable albums. Som Livre began collaborations with musical artists Djavan and Rita Lee in 1976. Other musical artist collaborators included Guilherme Arantes, Tim Maia, Lulu Santos, Barão Vermelho, Cazuza, Luiz Melodia, Gal Costa, Simone, Jorge Ben Jor, Renata Vasconcellos, Elis Regina, Fafá de Belém, Moraes Moreira, Djavan, Novos Baianos, Fábio Jr., Agepê, Francis Hime, and Xuxa. In 1988, the label produced Xuxa’s third album, Xou da Xuxa 3, which was the best-selling album in Som Livre’s history with 3,316,704 copies sold.

In 1999, the company started selling its products online, reaching R$1.342 million in sales within four months. Som Livre was the first Brazilian record label to release cell phone ringtones.

In 2007, Som Livre released its SLAP label, which focused on signing on new Brazilian talent. New artists collaborations included Latin Grammy-nominated Maria Gadú and Michel Teló, Tiago Iorc, and Little Joy. In celebration of its 5-year anniversary, SLAP hosted a music festival at Cine Jóia in São Paulo. The festival featured Maria Gadú, Silva, Thaís Gulin, Tiago Iorc, Ana Canãs, Dani Black, and Jesuton and Marcelo Jeneci.

In 2014, Som Livre partnered with Eagle Rock Entertainment, signing onto international artists such as The Rolling Stones and Elton John. In 2016, the label launched its Austro Music label, dedicated to electronic music. Austro Music has worked with DJ DIB, Elefantz, Naza Brothers, and WAO.

With the rise in streaming service popularity, Som Livre partnered with Deezer, Spotify, Apple Music, and Globoplay. With Spotify, the two companies developed a new component through app which paired 27 iconic telenovela characters to their respective soundtrack. In 2018, the label worked with Apple Music to stream its music on Apple's platform. Som Livre’s partnership with Globoplay led to an "on demand" service, in which the label released artist content exclusively for its subscribers.

== Gospel ==
Som Livre was the first record label to invest in Brazil’s gospel music market. In 2009, Som Livre released its first gospel album, CD Promessas, which sold 500,000 copies. The following year, the label launched Festival Promessas, the biggest evangelical music event in Brazil.

According to the Brazilian Association of Record Producers (ABPD), gospel music was the second most popular musical genre in Brazil in 2011. In 2012, Som Livre launched Você Adora, a gospel subdivision of the label. Amongst Você Adora’s gospel artists are Ludmila Ferber, David Quinlan, Rose Nascimento, André Valadão, Eliane Silva, Davi Sacer, and Ton Carfi.

== Labels ==
- Austro Music
- SLAP
- Soma
- Diretoria Funk
- Inbraza
- Sigem
- Globo Records (Italy)

== Som Livre Masters series ==
Som Livre commissioned Charles Gavin to select 25 rare albums for inclusion in their Som Livre Masters Series of CD reissues. The albums:

1. Sambas – Dom Júnior, Walter Wanderley, Milton Banana
2. Bossa Nova, Nova Bossa – Manfredo Fest
3. Bossa Jazz Trio – Bossa Jazz Trio
4. Sansa Trio – Sansa Trio
5. Os Brazões – Os Brazões
6. Em Som Maior – Sambrasa Trio
7. Sambossa 5
8. Quarteto Bossamba – Walter Wanderley
9. Reencontro com Sambalanço Trio – Sambalanço Trio
10. Som 3 – Cesar Camargo Mariano
11. Os Sambistas – Paulinho da Viola
12. Decisão – Zimbo Trio
13. Brazilian Octopus – Hermeto Pascoal
14. Como Dizia O Poeta – Vinicius de Moraes, Marília Medalha, Toquinho
15. E deixa o relógio andar – Osmar Milito
16. Rosinha de Valença – Rosinha de Valença
17. Molhado de Suor – Alceu Valença
18. Vila Sésamo
19. Vamos pro Mundo – Novos Baianos
20. Gerson Conrad e Zeze Motta
21. Sítio do Picapau Amarelo
22. Tim Maia – Tim Maia
23. Vontade De Rever Você – Marcos Valle
24. Nave Maria – Tom Zé
25. Línguas De Fogo – Sidney Miller
26. Gustavo So Para Baixinhos – Gustavo Sibilio Borges

== Artists ==
- Amigos
- Anezzi
- Bhaskar
- Bivolt
- Carol & Vitoria
- César Menotti e Fabiano
- Céu
- Cleber & Cauan
- Costa Gold
- Davi Sacer
- Edi Rock
- Edu Chociay
- Erasmo Carlos
- Filipe Ret
- Gaab
- Gustavo Bertoni
- Gustavo Sibilio Borges
- Haikass
- Hugo & Guilherme
- Inbraza
- Israel & Rodolffo
- Jads & Jadson
- Jefferson Moraes
- João Bosco
- João Cavalcanti
- João Neto & Frederico
- Jonas Esticado
- Jonathan Ferr
- Jorge & Mateus
- Kafé
- Kekel
- Kevin o Chris
- Laila Garin
- Lexa
- Los Pantchos
- Lu & Alex
- Luiza & Maurílio
- Luthuly
- Maiara & Maraisa
- Mano Walter
- Marcelo Jeneci
- Maria Gadú
- Mariana Fagundes
- Marília Mendonça
- Matheus Fernandes
- May & Karen
- Menos É Mais
- Michel Teló
- Mojjo
- Naiara Azevedo
- Ney Matogrosso
- Nicolas Germano
- Novos Baianos
- Onze:20
- Raça Negra
- Raí Saia Rodada
- Ralk
- Rayane & Rafaela
- Roberto Menescal
- Samhara
- Scalene
- Thiaguinho
- Tiee
- Ton Carfi
- Welington & Nillo
- Wesley Safadão
- Xand Avião
- Zé Felipe
- Zé Maria
- Zé Neto & Cristiano
