= Michael Sullivan (singer-songwriter) =

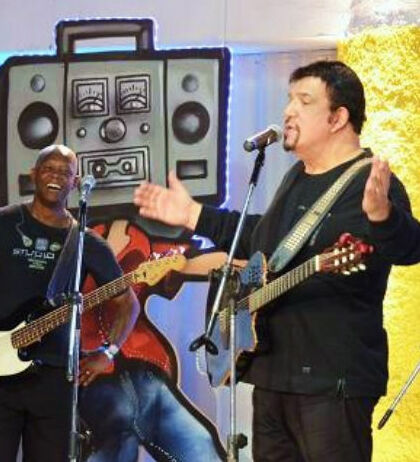
- Sullivan (right) in 2013

Background information
- Born: Ivanilton de Souza Lima; March 9, 1950 (age 76); Recife, Pernambuco, Brazil
- Genres: MPB, rock, pop, soul, gospel music
- Occupations: Singer-songwriter, lyricist, guitarist, record producer
- Instruments: Vocals, electric guitar
- Years active: 1964–present
- Website: michaelsullivan.com.br

Ivanilton de Souza Lima (born March 9, 1950, in Recife, Brazil), known by his stage name Michael Sullivan, is a Brazilian singer-songwriter, lyricist and guitarist. Brazilian composer, singer, musician, and producer Michael Sullivan is considered the most prolific and successful Brazilian songwriter of all time, with more than 2000 recorded songs by Brazilian, Hispanic and Global artists, released in 60 markets in Latin and North Americas, Europe, Asia and Middle East regions. Throughout his career, Sullivan has performed in successful groups and as a solo artist in multiple genres from ballads to gospel and has sold 60 million albums and received 60 Diamond, 270 Platinum and 550 Gold awards, inducted into the Latin Songwriters Hall Of Fame at the 7th annual La Musa Awards.

Michael Sullivan started his solo career singing in English with the song My Life (his second composition), The compact My Life became one of the best sellers in Brazil for the phonographic market, surpassing the mark of 1,000,000 copies, which was equivalent to a Diamond Record.

== Discography ==
=== Singles and EPs (in English) ===
- 1976 - My Life
- 1977 - Sorrow / Please, Please

=== Singles and EPs ===
- 1978 - Um Mundo Melhor Pro Meu Filho
- 1978 - Un Mundo Mejor Para Mi Hijo Tuve Miedo De Amar
- 1980 - Michael Sullivan
- 1980 - Vou Fazer Você Mulher

=== Albums ===
- 1978 - Sou Brasileiro
- 1979 - Michael Sullivan
- 1992 - Talismã
- 1995 - Amar É Lindo
- 2005 - Duetos
- 2010 - Na Linha Do Tempo Ao Vivo (Volume 1)
- 2010 - Na Linha Do Tempo Ao Vivo (Volume 2)
