= Latin Grammy Award for Best Children's Music Album =

- Awarded for: Quality children's music albums
- Country: United States
- Presented by: The Latin Recording Academy
- First award: 2000
- Currently held by: Canticuentos, Coro de Ríogrande, Gustavo Gordillo, Andrés Leal, Juan Gabriel Turbay and Carlos Vives for Los Nuevos Canticuentos (2025)
- Website: latingrammy.com

The Latin Grammy Award for Best Children's Music Album is an honor presented annually at the Latin Grammy Awards, a ceremony that recognizes excellence and promotes awareness of cultural diversity and the contributions of Latin musicians in the United States and worldwide. The award has been presented every year since the inaugural ceremony, which took place at the Staples Center in Los Angeles.

The category is limited to children's music albums, intended to be educational and to support the intellectual, musical, motor, and language development of children up to 8 years old. It is awarded to the artist responsible for 51% or more of the album’s playing time; if no artist qualifies, the award is presented to the producer. Recordings in Portuguese-language are also eligible.

Brazilian singer and television host Xuxa and Spanish clown and musician Emilio Aragón Bermúdez, known as "Miliki", are the only artists to have won the award more than once, with two wins each. Xuxa is also the most nominated artist in the category, with seven nominations.

== Winners and nominees ==
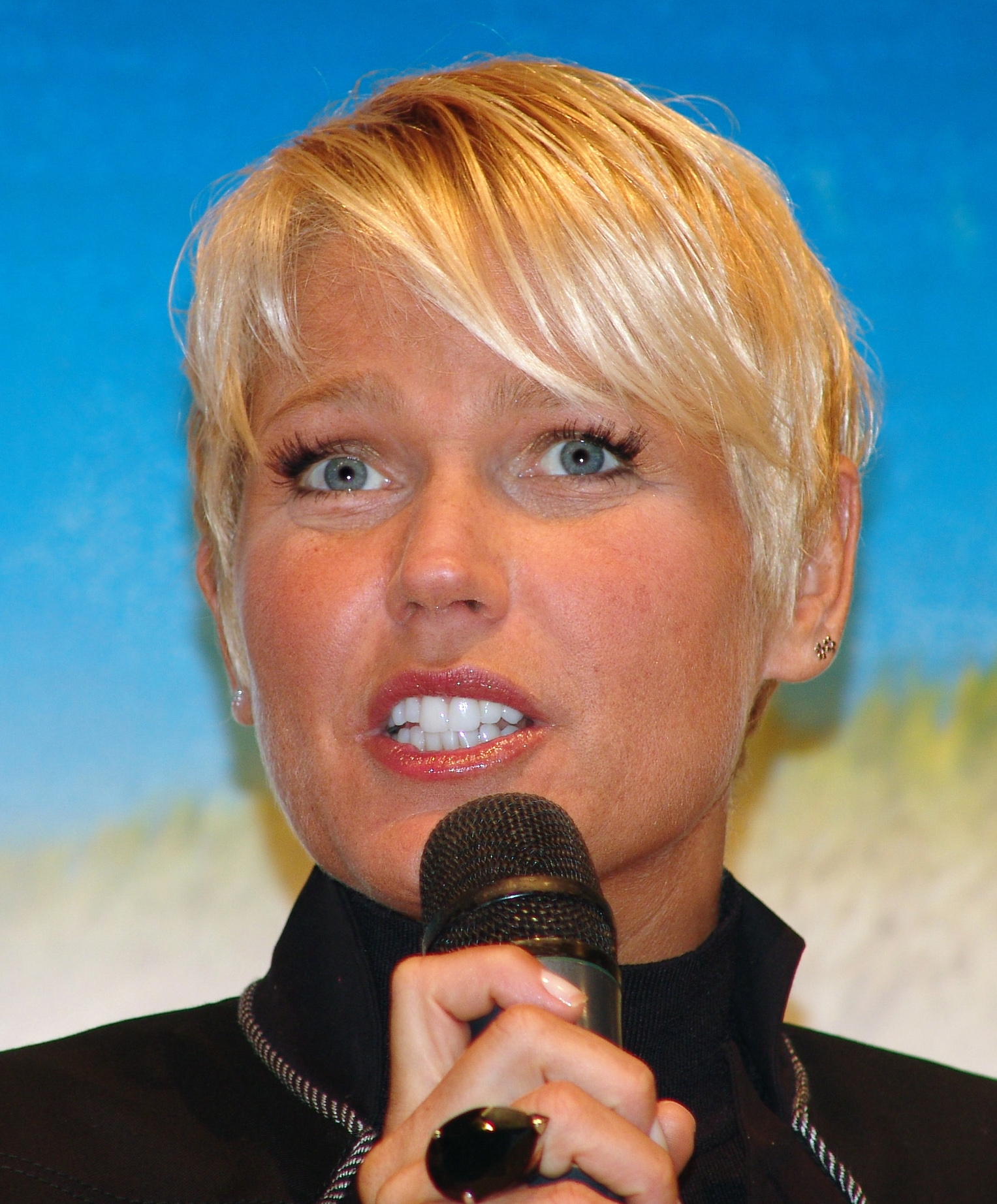
Brazilian singer and TV host Xuxa won the award in 2002 and 2003.

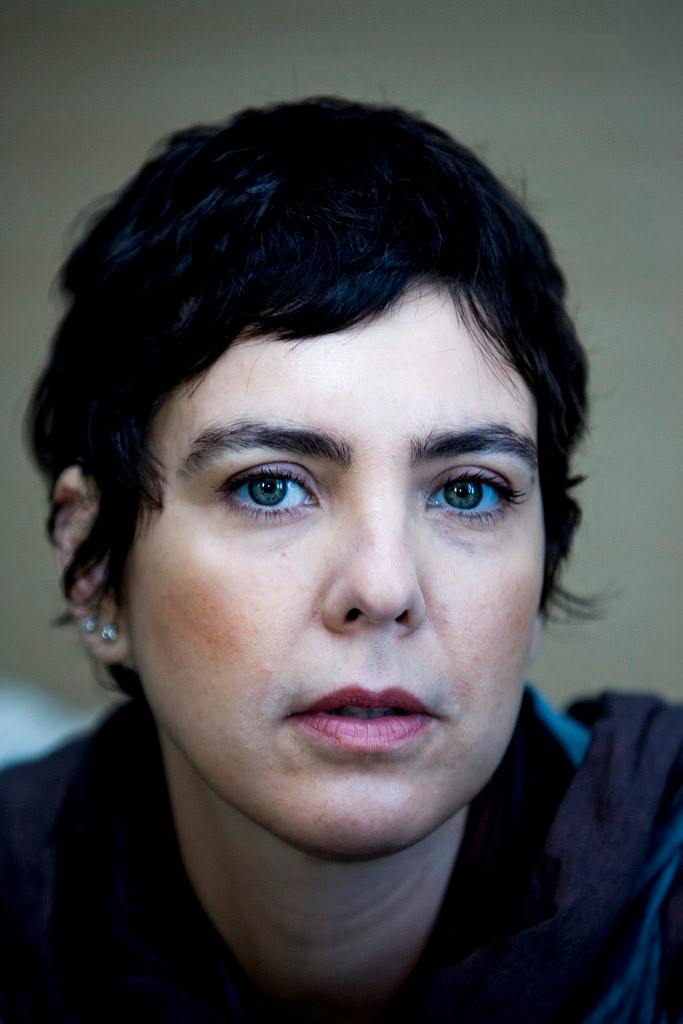
Brazilian singer Adriana Calcanhotto won the award in 2006.

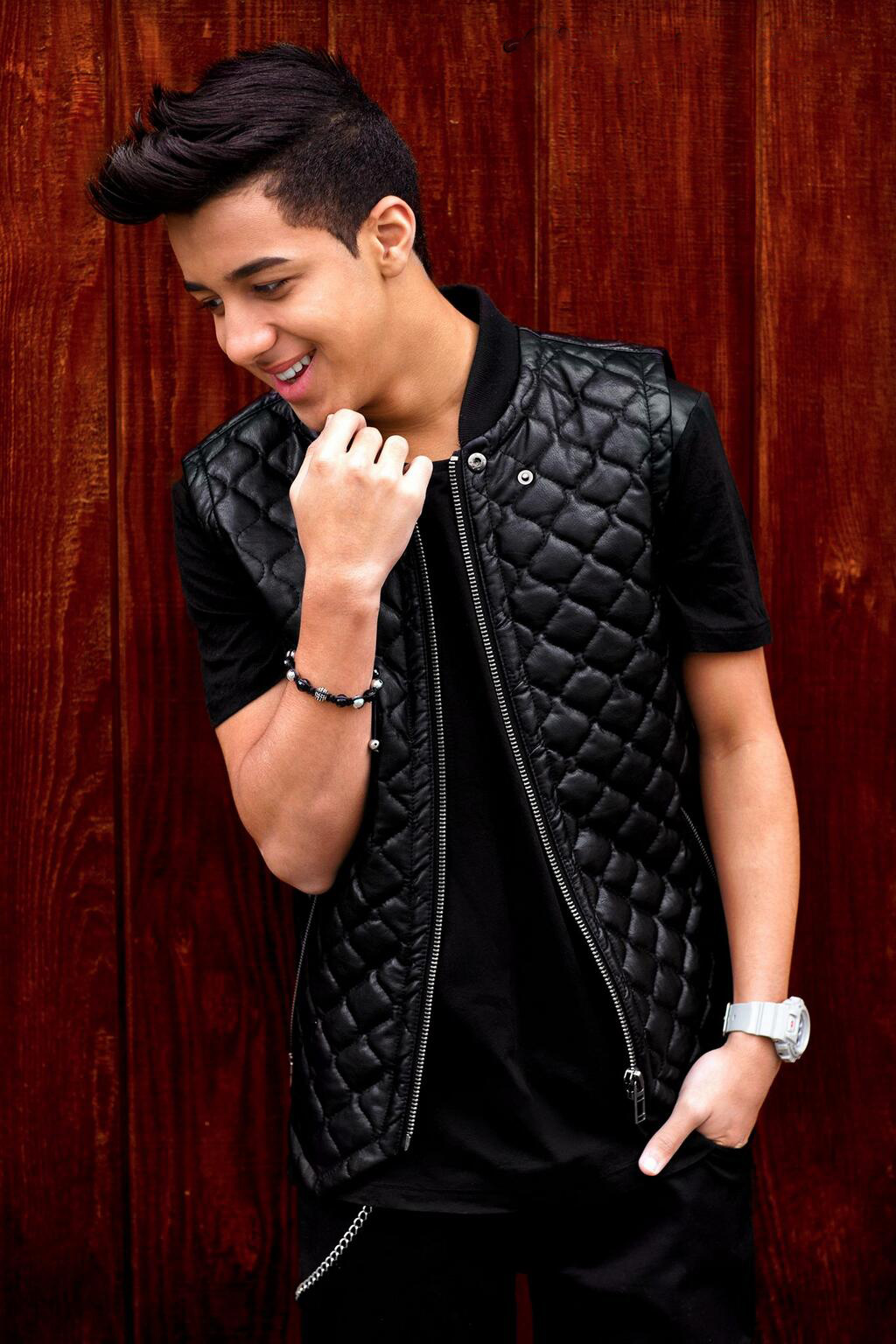
Puerto Rican singer Miguelito won the award in 2008.

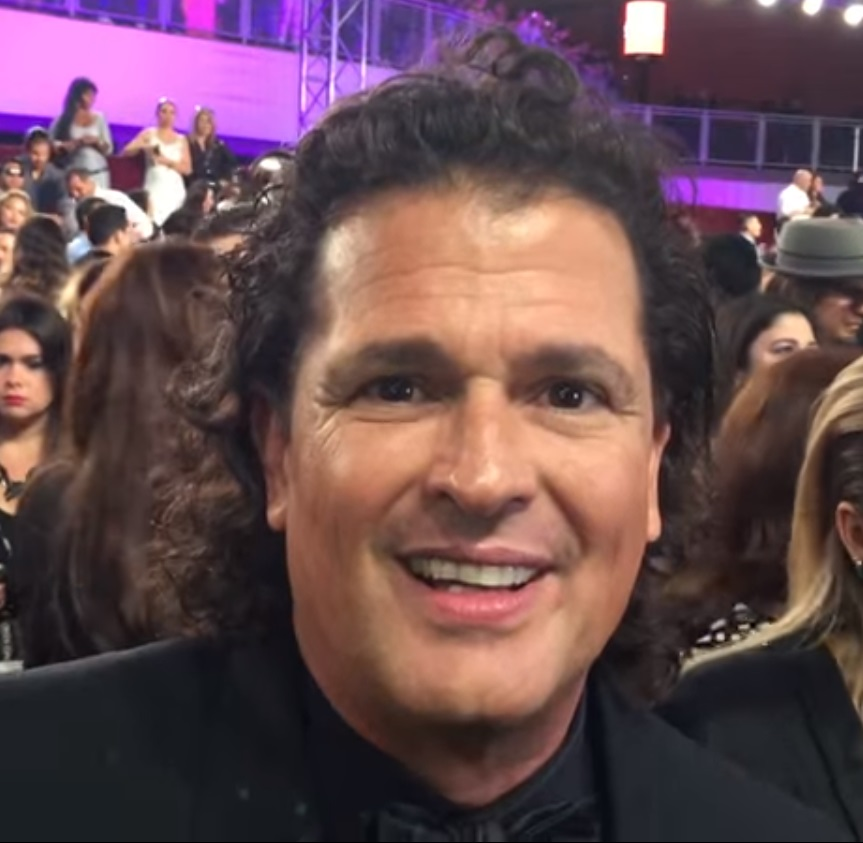
Colombian singer Carlos Vives has won the award twice, in 2009 and 2025, both times as a producer.

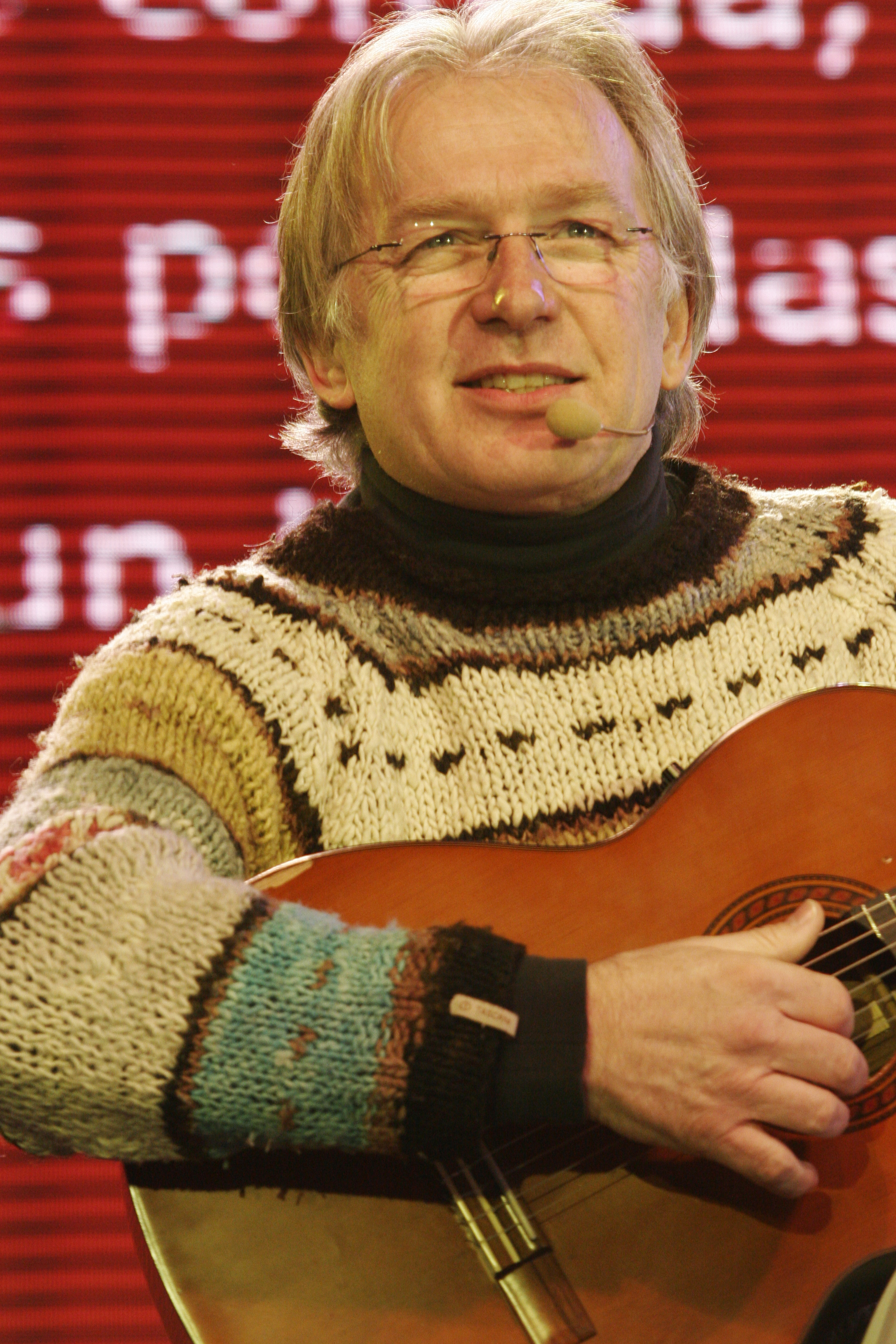
Argentine musician Luis Pescetti won the award in 2010.

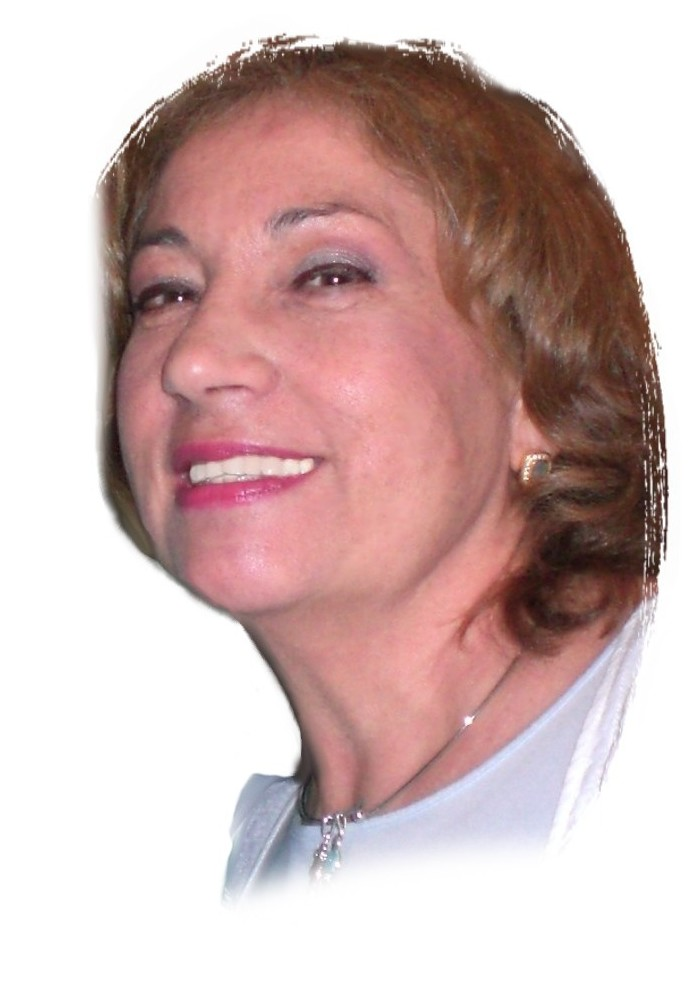
Venezuelan singer María Teresa Chacín won the award in 2012.

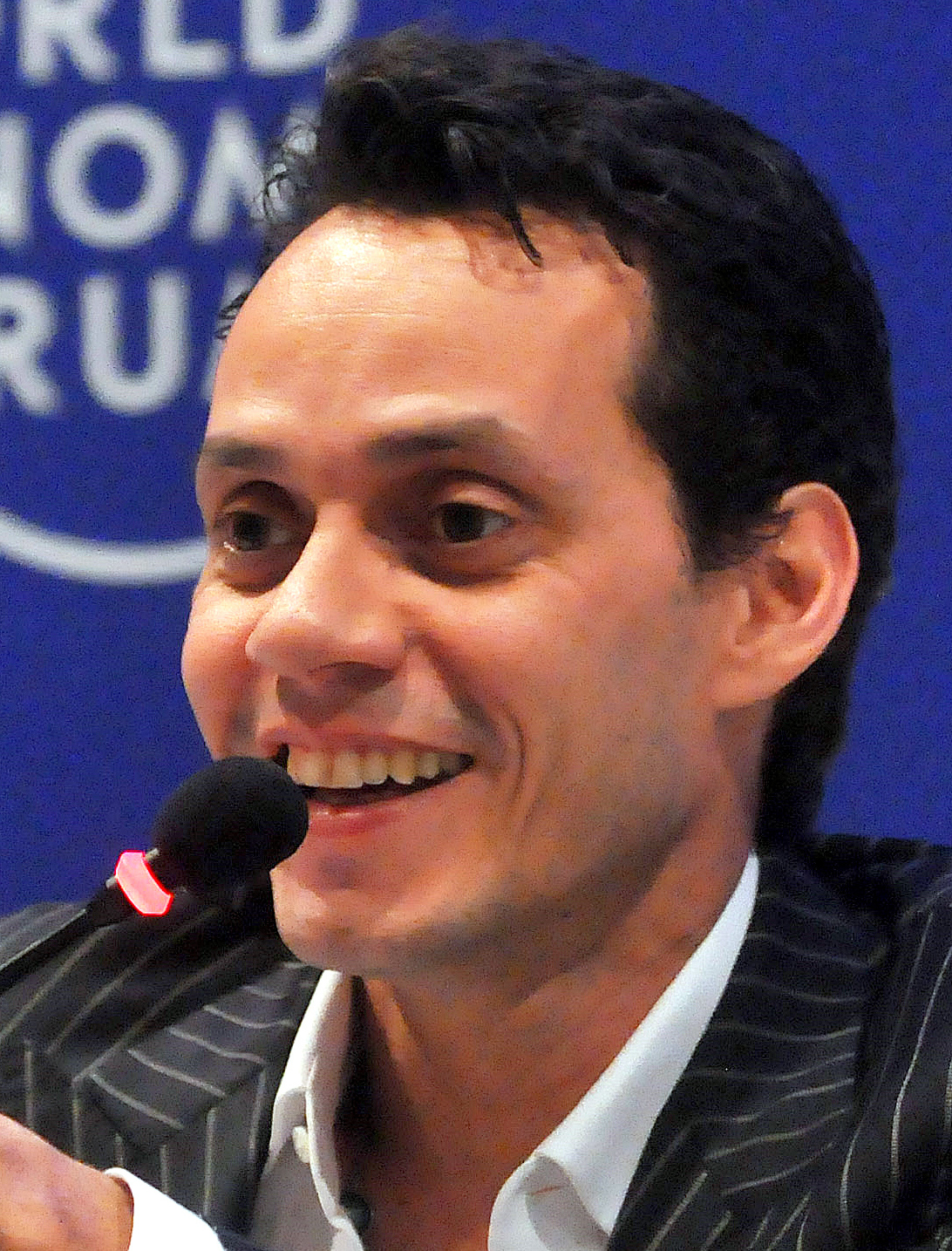
Marc Anthony won the award in 2017.

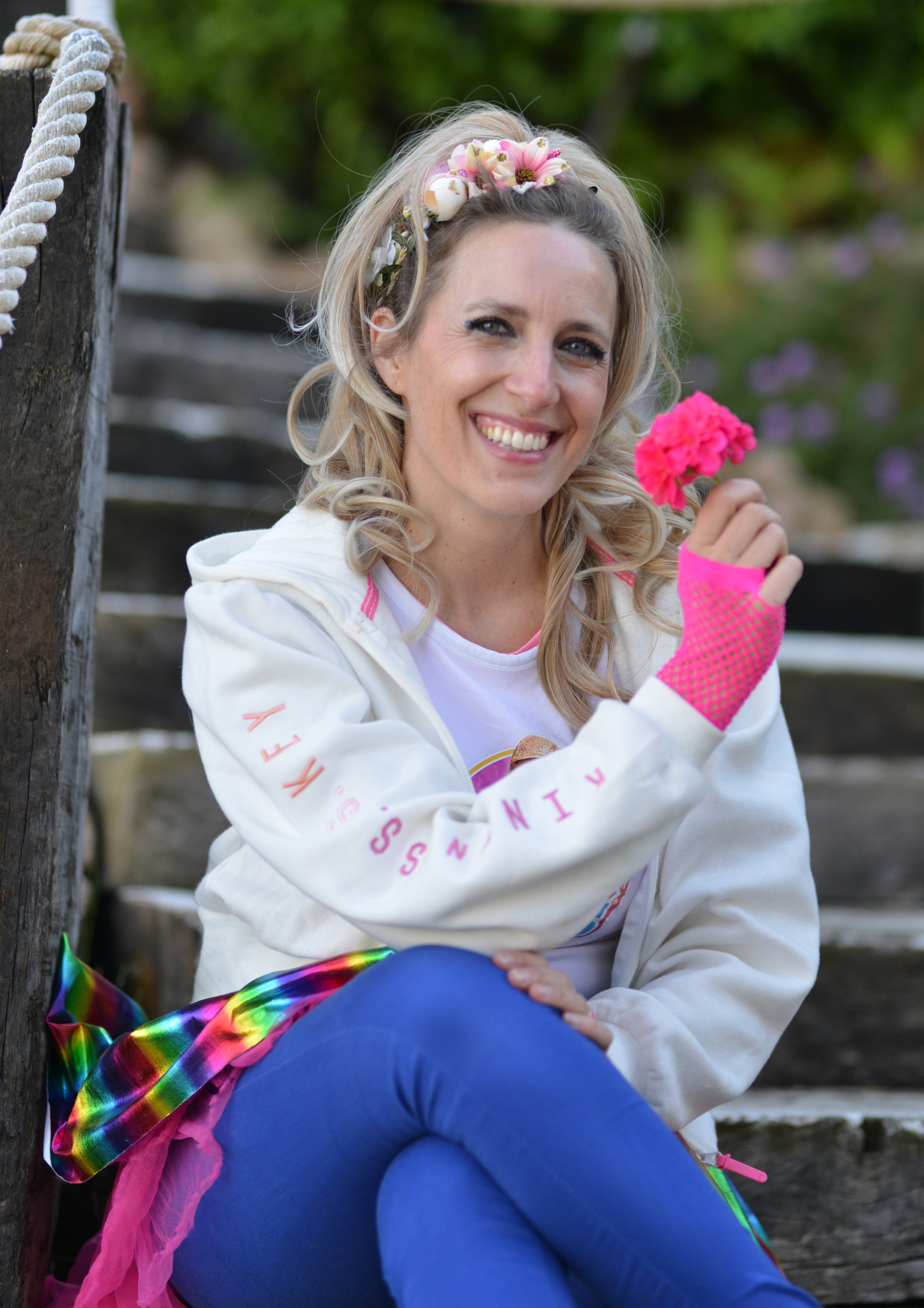
2020 winner, Tina Kids.

Year	Recipient(s)	Work	Nominees	Ref.
2000	Miliki: Oscar Gómez & José Morato, producers	A Mis Niños de 30 Años	Daniela Luján (performer); Alejandro Abaroa (producer) – El Diario de Daniela; Various Artists (performers); Chacho Gaytán (producer) – Ellas Cantan a Cri Cri; Maria Del Rey – Lullabies of Latin America: Canciones de Cuna de Latinoamérica; Eliana (performer); Leandro Lehart, Lincoln Olivetti & João Plinta (producers) – Primavera	
2001	Miliki: Oscar Gómez & José Morato, producers	Cómo Estan Ustedes?	Los Niños de Cuba (performer); Carlos Cano (producer) – Así Cantan Los Niños De Cuba; Lindalys Morán, Miguel Cano & Emily Cano (performers); Coalo Zamorano (producer) – Niños Adorando; El Morro (performer); Pepe Garza & Tomás Rubio (producers) – Puras Para Niños, Vol. 1; Colegio de Música de Medellín (performer); Marta Agudelo Villa (producer) – Traralalala	
2002	Xuxa: Zé Henrique, producer	Xuxa só para Baixinhos 2	Belinda (performer); Alejandro Abaroa (producer) – Cómplices al rescate; Chiquititas (performer); Carlos Nilson (producer) – Chiquititas Vol. 7; Melody (performer); Gustavo Ramudo (producer) – De Pata Negra; Miliki (performer); Oscar Gómez & José Morato (producers) – Navidades Animadas	
2003	Xuxa: Zé Henrique & Xuxa, producers	Xuxa só para Baixinhos 3 – Country	Cómplices Al Rescate (performer); Alejandro Abaroa (producer) – Cómplices Al Rescate: El Gran Final; Beatriz Contreras, Lila Jaramillo and Orlando Sandoval (performers); Lila Jaramillo & Orlando Sandoval (producers) – Carta al Niño Dios; Tatiana (performer); Jorge Avendaño (producer) – Los Mejores Temas de las Películas de Walt Disney; Various Artists; Alejandro Allen & Edgar Arceo (producers) – Canciones de Gozo Para Niños	
2004	Niños Adorando: Coalo Zamorano, producer	Niños Adorando 2	Alegrijes y Rebujos (performer); Alejandro Abaroa (producer) – Disco; Tatiana (performer and producer) – El Regalo; Various Artists; Alejandro Allen & Edgar Arceo (producers) – Canciones Con Acción Para Niños; Xuxa (performer); Ary Sperling (producer) – Xuxa só para Baixinhos 4 – Praia	
2005	Lina Luna	Lina Luna	Christell – La Fiesta Continúa!!!; Floricienta – Floricienta y su banda; Ke Zafados – Ke Zafados; Los Payasónicos – Poder Payasónico; Misión S.O.S – Aventura y Amor	
2006	Adriana Partimpim	Adriana Partimpim - O Show	Griselle Bou, Victor Meléndez and Annette Bou – Canciones y Cantos-Juegos Infantiles Del Folklore Puertorriqueño; Tatiana – El Regalo 2; Xuxa – Xuxa só para Baixinhos 6 – Festa	
2007	Voz Veis	Cómo Se Llega A Belén	Acalanto – Vida Dde Bebê; Miguelito – Más Grande Que Tú; Zé Renato and Convidados – Forró Prás Crianças; Strings For Kids – El Sueño del Elefante	
2008	Miguelito	El Heredero	Claraluna – Un Lugar Llamado Colombia; Raquel Durães – Hora de Dormir; Niños Adorando – Niños Adorando 3; Remi – Alegrate; Strings For Kids – Acordes para Hormiguitas y Menudas Criaturas	
2009	Various Artists: Carlos Vives, producer	Pombo Musical	Jair Oliveira and Tania Khalill – Grandes Pequeninos; Rita Rosa – El Patio de Tu Casa; Veveta and Saulinho – A Casa Amarela; Vitor and Vitória – Vitor e Vitória	
2010	Luis Pescetti	Luis Pescetti	Banda de Boca – MPB Pras Crianças; Rita Rosa – Insectos y Bicharracos; Various Artists; Paulo Bira (producer) – Brasileirinhos; Various Artists; Andrés Cáceres (producer) – Lo Mejor de Playhouse Disney	
2011	Pato Fu	Música de Brinquedo	Claraluna – Un Mundo de Navidad; Piero – Sinfonia Inconclusa En 'L'a Mar; Omara Portuondo – Reír y Cantar; Jessyca Sarango – Henry El Camioncito Verde; Topa & Muni – La Casa de Playhouse Disney; Various Artists; Alvaro Gómez & Juan Ricardo Weiler (producer) – Cantando Aprendo a Hablar: Vamos a Jugar	
2012	María Teresa Chacín	María Teresa Chacín Canta Cuentos	Miguelito – Tiempo de Navidad; Rita Rosa y Amigos – Canciones de Agua; Various Artists; Kaylin Frank & Mitchell Leib (producers) – Disney's Los Muppets Banda Sonora Original de Walt Disney Records; Xuxa – Xuxa só para Baixinhos Vol. 11 – Sustentabilidade	
2013	Lucky Díaz y La Familia Música	¡Fantástico!	Atención Atención – Vamos A Bailar; Eslabones Kids – Vamos A Cantar; Karito – Estoy Feliz; Miami Lighthouse for the Blind – Four Magical Stories to Live	
2014	Marta Gómez and Friends	Coloreando: Traditional Songs For Children In Spanish	Mister G – ABC Fiesta; Rita Rosa – Rumba Flora: La Historia De Uva Y Garbancito; Thalía – Viva Kids Vol. 1; Xuxa – Xuxa só para Baixinhos 12 – É Pra Dançar	
2015	Mister G	Los Animales	Chino & Nacho – Chino & Nacho para bebes; Lucky Díaz y la Familia Jam Band – Adelante; Mister G – Los animales; Rockcito – De La Cuna A La Jungla; 123 Andrés – ¡Uno, Dos, Tres, Andrés! En Español y En Inglés	
2016	123 Andrés	Arriba Abajo	Claraluna – 1,2,3 Llega Navidad; Marta Gómez – Canciones de Sol; Omara Portuondo – Canciones de Cri Cri "El Grillo Cantor"; Various Artists; Carlos Cano, Aldo Méndez & Hernán Milla (producers) – Canciones y Palabras, Vol. 1; Xuxa – Abc Do Xspb	
2017	Various Artists: Marc Anthony, Carlos Escalona Cruz & Miguel Ignacio Mendoza, producers	Marc Anthony for Babies	Mariana Baraj – ¡Churo!; Cantajuego – ¡Viva Mi Planeta 2!; Cepillín – Gracias; Luis Pescetti – Queridos (en vivo); Sophia – Aprendendo Ritmos da América	
2018	Claraluna	Imaginare	Ana & Gio – Ana & Gio; Mundo Bita – Bita e a natureza; Luis Pescetti y Amigos – Magia todo el día; Colectivo Animal – Un bosque encantado 2	
2019	The Lucky Band	Buenos Diaz	Claraluna – Luces, Cámara, Acción; Sonia De Los Santos – ¡Alegría!; Payasitas Nifu Nifa – Bim Bom Bam!; 123 Andrés – Canta Las Letras	
2020	Tina Kids	Canta y Juega	Colegio de Música de Medellín – Viva la Fiesta; The Lucky Band – Paseo Lunar; Sophia – Artistas de Profesión; Veleta Roja – Sonidos que Cuentan	
2021	Tu Rockcito and Orquesta Filarmónica de Medellín	Tu Rockcito Filármonico	Cantoalegre; Edith Derdyk, Daniel Escobar, Luis Fernando Franco, Jesús David Garcés, Fito Hernández, Paulo Tatit & José Julián Villa, album producers – Otra Vuelta al Sol; Danilo & Chapis – Danilo & Chapis, Vol. 1; Mi Casa Es Tu Casa – Canciones de Cuna; Victoria Sur – Nanas Consentidoras	
2022	Sophia	A la Fiesta de la Música Vamos Todos	Claraluna – Marakei; Danilo & Chapis – Danilo & Chapis, Vol. 2; Mi Casa Es Tu Casa – Tarde de Juegos; Puerto Candelaria – La Sinfonía de los Bichos Raros	
2023	Danilo & Chapis	Vamos al Zoo	Flor Bromley – Aventuras; Gaby Moreno & Zona Neon – Cantando Juntos; María Mulata – Colcha de Retazos; Veleta Roja – ¿Y Si Pido Que Me Cuentes?	
2024	Danilo & Chapis	¡A Cantar!	Cantoalegre & Orquesta La Pascasia – Navidad de Norte a Sur: Cantoaegre Big Band (En Vivo); Claraluna – Cantemos Juntos; Payasitas Nifu Nifa – Dun Dun Dara; Todos Podemos Cantar – Todos Podemos Cantas 2024	
2025	Canticuentos & Coro de Ríogrande: Gustavo Gordillo, Andrés Leal, Juan Gabriel Turbay & Carlos Vives, producers	Los Nuevos Canticuentos	Antonio Caramelo & Malibu – Aventuras de Caramelo; Palavra Cantada – Cenas Infantis; Luis Pescetti & Juan Quintero – Buscapié; Rita Rosa – Jirafas	
