= Baseline =

A baseline is a line that is a base for measurement or for construction.

The word baseline may refer to:

- Baseline (configuration management), the process of managing change in software or other fields
- Baseline (sea), the starting point for delimiting a coastal state's maritime zones
- Baseline, in underwater diving, a value used to convert cylinder pressure of a tank to free gas volume
- Baseline (surveying), a line between two points of the Earth's surface and the direction and distance between them
- Baseline (typography), the line upon which most letters "sit" and below which descenders extend
- Baseline (budgeting), an estimate of budget expected during a fiscal year
- Baseline (science), information found at the beginning of a study
- Baseline (pharmacology), a person's state of mind or being, in the absence of drugs
- The isoelectric line of an electrocardiogram
- Baseline (interferometry), the length of an astronomical interferometer

The name Baseline may refer to:

- Baseline (magazine), a magazine devoted to typography, book arts, graphic design
- Baseline (database), a TV and movie industry database
- Baselines (album), the 1983 debut album of composer Bill Laswell
- Baseline Road (Arizona), a major east–west artery in Phoenix, Arizona
- Baseline Road (Colorado), a major east–west artery in Boulder, Colorado
- Baseline Road (Ottawa), a major east–west artery in Ottawa, Ontario
- Baseline station, a transitway station in Ottawa
- Base Line, Arkansas
- Baseline Nunataks
- Baseline Rock

It may also refer to:

- The base line in baseball
- The back line on a tennis court, and also a style of play in tennis; see tennis strategy
- The back line on a pickleball court
- The end line on a basketball court
- A bassline in music
- A shifting baseline in statistics
- Baseline Killer, a serial killer who was active in the Phoenix metro area between August 2005 and June 2006

== See also ==
- Baseline Road (disambiguation)
- Benchmark (disambiguation)
