= Benchmark =

Benchmark may refer to:

== Business and economics ==
- Benchmarking, evaluating performance within organizations
- Benchmark price
- Benchmark (crude oil), oil-specific practices

== Science and technology ==
- Experimental benchmarking, the act of defining an experimental reference system to compare the accuracy of other non-experimental scientific methods
- Benchmark (surveying), a point of known elevation marked for the purpose of surveying, a type of survey marker
- Benchmarking (geolocating), an activity involving finding surveying benchmarks
- Benchmark (computing), the result of running a computer program to assess performance
- Language model benchmark, a particular kind of computing benchmark, specialized for assessing the performance of language models.
- Benchmark, a best-performing, or gold standard test in medicine and statistics

== Companies ==
- Benchmark Electronics, an electronics manufacturer
- Benchmark (venture capital firm), a venture capital firm
- Benchmark Recordings, a music label with CDs by the Fabulous Thunderbirds and Mike Bloomfield

== Other uses ==
- Benchmarking (journal), a bimonthly peer-reviewed academic journal relating to the field of quality management
- McAfee's Benchmark, a brand of bourbon
- Benchmark (game show), on UK Channel 4

== See also ==
- Specification (technical standard)
