= GBN =

GBN may refer to:

== Media ==
- Global Broadcast News India
- Gospel Broadcasting Network, US Christian satellite broadcaster
- Global Buddhist Network, Thai digital television station
- GB News, UK opinion-orientated channel

== Other uses ==
- Go-Back-N ARQ, reliable data transfer protocol
- Gebrüder Bing Nuremberg, German toy company
- Glenbrook North High School
- Gödel-Bernays-Von Neumann set theory
- Global Benchmarking Network
- Gore Beyond Necropsy, a Japanese band
- Nationality code of British National (Overseas) in the machine-readable passport
