= Natacha =

Natacha may refer to:

- Natacha (comics), a Franco-Belgian comics series
- Natacha (novel), a children's book by Luis Pescetti
- Natacha (given name), people with the given name Natacha
- Polikarpov R-Z nickname in the Spanish Republican Air Force

== See also ==
- Natasha (disambiguation)
