= ¡Buenísimo, Natacha! =

Book by Luis Pescetti

¡Buenísimo, Natacha! is a children's book by Argentine writer and singer Luis Pescetti. It was first published in 2002. It is the fourth book of a children's literature series about a little girl called Natacha and her experiences.

The first edition with illustrations from O'Kif was published by argentine publisher Alfaguara in 2002 in Buenos Aires. A second edition illustrated by Pablo Fernández came out in 2008 in celebration of the ten year anniversary of the first book of the series "Natacha".

The CD "Antología de Luis Pescetti" contains two chapters of this book: Novios (Boyfriend and girlfriend) and Escribiendo la famosa carta (Writing the famous letter).

== Synopsis ==
The book includes a series of independent stories based on the central plot that revolves around Natacha and Pati's idea to write love letters as a service for their schoolmates. These stories are mixed with the events of Natacha and her classmates doing homework for their school's science fair.

Books in the same series are:

- Natacha (novel)
- La tarea según Natacha
- ¡Buenísimo, Natacha!
- Chat, Natacha, chat
- Bituín bituín Natacha
- Querido diario (Natacha)
- La enciclopedia de las Chicas Perla
- Te amo, lectura (Natacha)
- Nuestro planeta, Natacha
