= Eric Herman =

Eric Herman may refer to:

- Eric Herman (American football) (born 1989), American football offensive guard
- Eric Herman (musician) (born 1969), American musician
