= 123 Andrés =

Colombian children's music duo

- Origin: Colombia
- Genres: Children's music
- Years active: 2015–present
- Labels: Salsana Music; Salsana Records
- Members: Andrés Salguero; Christina Sanabria
- Website: https://123andres.com/

123 Andrés are a husband-and-wife duo that creates children's music in both English and Spanish. They have performed for audiences across the US as well as in Puerto Rico, Panama, and Mexico.

They have been winners of the Best Latin Children's Album category at the Latin Grammy Awards for Arriba Abajo, and nominated for Grammy Awards in the same category in 2021 for Actívate. In 2024, they won the Grammy Award for Best Children's Music Album for their album We Grow Together Children's Songs.

== Members ==
Andrés Salguero was raised in Bogotá, Colombia and grew up playing guitar with his father. He has remained involved with music ever since, studying clarinet at the Conservatory and having his first experience in a studio at the age of eight. Later, Andrés earned his Doctorate in music and was awarded first prize in a national composition contest in Colombia.

Christina Sanabria grew up in a Spanish speaking family in the United States; her parents are from Colombia. She attended Shawnee Mission North High School in Overland Park, Kansas. She then matriculated at Brown University where she concentrated in Latin American and Hispanic Studies. Throughout childhood, she was involved in theater and dance and would later earn a master's degree in education from The University of Pennsylvania. Christina applied this education to find her passion in teaching through music.

== Musical career ==
123 Andrés make music for bilingual children and families, as well as for those who are in the process of learning Spanish. Their first album, ¡Uno, Dos Tres Andrés! en español y en inglés, was released in 2015, with 22 educational songs; 11 in Spanish and 11 in English. They were nominated for a Latin Grammy. Their next album, Arriba Abajo, came the next year and returned to the awards to win a Latin Grammy for best children's music album. It also won a Parents' Choice Gold award. The third album is a collection of lullabies titled La Luna.

123 Andrés' album, Cantas las Letras, was designed to help children learn fundamental elements of Spanish language, specifically the letters and their different sounds. This album was created in partnership with the Benchmark Education Company. Originally it was made for use in a classroom, but it was decided to make the album available to the general public.

In 2021, they released "Actívate", an album with the collaboration of Rubén Blades, Gilberto Santa Rosa, Los Rabanes and Rafael "El Pollo" Brito, among others. 10 of the 21 songs that comprise the album are in Spanish. It was nominated at the 64th Grammy Awards for "Best Children's Music Album", being the only South American album nominated in that category.

The duo have been featured in outlets such as NPR, The Boston Globe, and The Washington Post, as well as Spanish language networks like Univisión and Telemundo.

== Discography ==
- 2015: ¡Uno, Dos Tres Andrés!
- 2016: Arriba Abajo
- 2018: La Luna
- 2019: Canta las Letras
- 2021: Actívate
- 2023: We Grow Together – Preschool Songs

== Bibliography ==
- 2021: Ten Little Birds – Diez Pajaritos
- 2021: Hi Friend – Hola Amigo
- 2021: Mi Comunidad / My Community

== Awards and nominations ==
=== Grammy Awards ===
Year	Nominee / work	Award	Result
2021	Actívate	Best Children's Album	Nominated
2024	We Grow Together	Best Children's Album	Won

=== Latin Grammy Awards ===
Year	Nominee / work	Award	Result
2015	¡Uno, Dos, Tres, con Andrés!	Best Latin Children's Album	Nominated
2016	Arriba Abajo	Best Latin Children's Album	Won
2019	Canta las Letras	Best Latin Children's Album	Nominated

=== Other awards ===
- Arriba Abajo: Parents' Choice Gold Award
- Arriba Abajo: Notable Children’s Recording by the American Library Association
- Canta Las Letras: Parents' Choice Silver Award.
