= Victoria Sur =

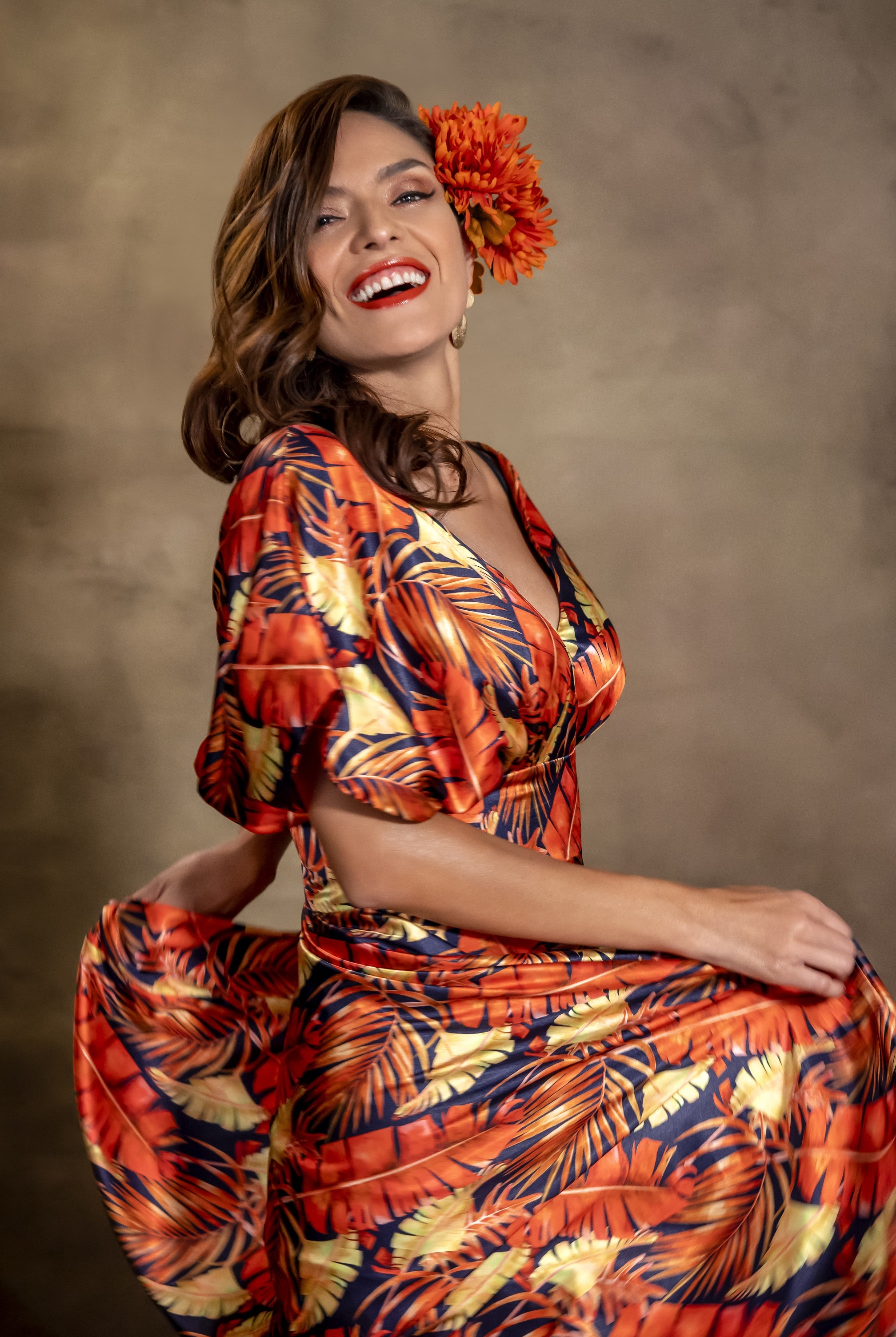

Background information
- Born: Victoria Eugenia Hernández Urrea; Armenia, Quindío
- Genres: Andean, rock, jazz, children's song, latin
- Occupations: Singer, songwriter
- Instruments: Voice, guitar
- Years active: 1990–present
- Label: Independent

Victoria Eugenia Hernández Urrea, better known as Victoria Sur, is a Colombian singer, musician and composer born in Armenia, Quindío. In 2021 she was nominated for the Latin Grammy Awards in the category of Best Latin Children's Album, for her record Nanas consentidoras.

== Biography ==
=== Early life and Sombra y Luz duet ===
Victoria was born in Armenia, capital of the department of Quindío. She began her musical career at the age of ten, forming the duet Sombra y Luz with Luz Ángela Jiménez, a childhood friend. In the duet, which performed traditional Colombian music, she participated in several music festivals and recorded four albums. In 1994 she received an award at the Mono Núñez Music Festival in the category of Best Vocal Duet. Parallel to her work in Sombra y Luz, Victoria was a member of other musical projects, like Mandrágora.

=== Career as a solo artist ===
==== Bambuco ácido and Colección de mundos ====
After her experience with Sombra y Luz, Victoria moved to Havana, Cuba to further her musical studies. There she began to compose songs and worked with a group of Colombian performers fusing Atlantic and Pacific rhythms with jazz, rock and other sounds. She later returned to her country with some of her own compositions and recorded her first album under the stage name of Victoria Sur: Bambuco ácido. The disc, released in 2004, featured the collaboration of Colombian artist Juan Sebastián Monsalve.

After participating in various events like the Ibero-American Theater Festival in Bogota and performing the official song of the 2005 Bolivarian Games, held in the cities of Armenia and Pereira, in 2008 she released her second studio album, entitled Colección de mundos. For the recording she was inspired by the work of progressive rock bands such as Pink Floyd, Supertramp and Queen, and was produced by musicians Luis Fernando Charry of the band The Hall Effect and Ernesto "Teto" Ocampo of the group La Provincia.

==== Belleza silvestre and Tu continente ====
Thanks to the funding obtained after winning the Peña de Mujeres prize, awarded by the Gilberto Alzate Avendaño Foundation, Victoria Sur recorded her third disc in Buenos Aires, Argentina in 2010. The album, entitled Belleza silvestre, features a strong influence of South American music, and Argentine musicians like Claudio Cardone, Lucio Balduini, Alejandro Oliva and Cheba Massolo participated in its recording. The same year she participated in the celebration of the Bicentennial of the Independence of Colombia at the Plaza de Bolivar in Bogota, and received nominations in the Shock Awards in the category of Voice of the Year.

Her next work, entitled Tu continente (2015), is a tribute to Latin American female composers like Violeta Parra, Consuelo Velásquez, Chabuca Granda, Matilde Casazola and Zully Murillo. The album only features one song of her authorship, the homonymous song "Tu continente". Between 2016 and 2017 she participated in the musical and artistic project Tu nombre me sabe a tango, with which she had the opportunity to perform live in France, Spain and Colombia.

==== Hasta el nuevo sol and Nanas consentidoras ====
In 2017 she released Hasta el nuevo sol, her first album with original material since Belleza silvestre (2010). In this record she presents elements of rhythms such as Bolivian huayno, Brazilian bossa nova, Colombian bambuco, Peruvian zamacueca and Argentine baguala. That same year she received the Cafeto de Oro Award from the Mayor's Office of Armenia, and in 2018 she was recognized with the Artistic Merit Award from the Governor's Office of Quindío.

In 2020 she ventured into children's music with the album Nanas consentidoras. The idea of recording an album of these characteristics was born after covering the song "Dormite" as a tribute to Colombian singer-songwriter Zully Murillo in her album Tu continente, and the experience of having given birth to her twin children Valentina and Sebastián. Nanas consentidoras had a positive reception from the public and critics. It was included in the list of the most outstanding albums of 2020 by the Red de Periodistas Musicales de Iberoamérica (REDPEM) and earned the artist a nomination for the Latin Grammy Awards in the category of Best Latin Children's Album.

In 2021, she collaborated with Peruvian singer-songwriter Susana Baca in the musicalization of the poem "Camino de la patria" by Carlos Castro Saavedra.

== Discography ==
=== Solo ===
Year	Title	Record label
2004	Bambuco ácido	Independent
2008	Colección de mundos	Independent
2010	Belleza silvestre	Independent
2015	Tu continente	Independent
2017	Hasta el nuevo sol	Independent
2020	Nanas consentidoras	Independent

== Awards and nominations ==
Year	Event/Organization	Award/Category	Result
1994	Festival de Música Andina Mono Núñez	Best Vocal Duet (with Luz Ángela Jiménez)	Won
2003	Ministerio de Cultura	Best Rock Composition	Won
2010	Fundación Gilberto Alzate Avendaño	Peña de Mujeres Award	Won
2010	Shock Awards	Voice of the Year	Nominated
2017	Alcaldía del Municipio de Armenia	Cafeto de Oro Award	Won
2018	Gobernación del Departamento del Quindío	Artistic Merit Award	Won
2021	Latin Grammy Awards	Best Latin Children's Album	Nominated
