= Profit Impact of Market Strategy =

Project that uses empirical data

The Profit Impact of Market Strategy (PIMS) program is an empirical research initiative that analyzes the relationship between business strategy and performance outcomes. Launched at General Electric in the 1960s, the program maintains a database of 4,300 Strategic Business Units ("SBU") across multiple industries and geographies, yielding 12,600 observations (3-year snapshots) and over 25,000 business-years of longitudinal data. The database comprises 500 variables per SBU covering market position, customer value, cost structure, and competitive dynamics. Currently operated by pims.ai after a management buy-out, the program provides predictive analytics and benchmarking methodologies. Key strategic metrics include market share, product quality, investment intensity, and service quality, which the program correlates with financial performance outcomes.

== History ==
The PIMS project was originally initiated by senior managers at General Electric (GE) who sought to understand why some of their business units were more profitable than others. Under the direction of Sidney Schoeffler, an economics professor hired by GE for the purpose, the project was launched in the 1960s as an internal empirical study analyzing approximately 200 business units ranging from light bulbs to nuclear power stations. The aim was to make GE's SBUs comparable and identify factors that would impact economic success regardless of product type. Return on investment (ROI), i.e. the profit per unit of tied capital, was used as the primary measure of success.

1960s: Project launch at GE. The results were startling: a model with two dozen metrics capturing competitive strength, market health and productivity explained 70% of the variation in profits – and the results were independent of product and geography. It explained why GE’s foray into computers had failed and set clear priorities for resource allocation across the portfolio.

1972: After huge interest across corporate America, the project was transferred to the Marketing Science Institute, then under Harvard Business School, transforming it into a multi-company program.

1976: The American Strategic Planning Institute (SPI) in Cambridge, Massachusetts, took charge of the project, focusing on developing tools to support business decisions based on the empirical findings.

1982: A European branch was established. With hundreds of companies participating, the program demonstrated that its identified factors - termed "the laws of the marketplace" - operated consistently across time, geography, and industry.

1990s: PIMS Associates in London became the worldwide competence and design centre for PIMS, backed by 3i plc private equity.

2005: PIMS Associates became part of Malik Management Zentrum St. Gallen, Switzerland.

2022: A management buyout established pims.ai as an independent London-based advisory and software company specializing in predictive analytics, incorporating Malik Management methodologies and expanding into organizational transformation.

As of December 2025, the database continues to grow through anonymised client engagements, and is still drawn upon by academics and companies today.

== Database and Data Collection ==
As of December 2025, the PIMS database contains:

- 4,300 SBUs across industries and geographies, yielding 12,600 observations (3-year snapshots of each SBU)
- 500 variables per observation covering market position, customer value, cost structure, capital allocation, competitive dynamics, and financial outcomes
- 25,000+ business-years of longitudinal, panel data (average 5 years per SBU, minimum 3 years)

Data is collected at the strategic business unit level — the level where strategy is made and executed. Each SBU is analyzed as an independent competitive entity with its own market definition, rivals, customers, and strategic choices. This granularity enables the program to observe how the same SBU's performance changes as it adjusts market share, quality position, or R&D spending over time.

Variables are carefully selected and normalized across decades, enabling like-for-like comparisons. Complete variable definitions, calculation formulas, and collection protocols are maintained and stored for methodological transparency.

The database reflects the program's General Electric origins, with greater representation from pre-2000, North American, manufacturing-intensive businesses, though it has continuously expanded across sectors and geographies. Data comes from anonymized, confidential client engagements, capturing internal metrics from management accounts that are not publicly disclosed.

The original PIMS study surveyed more than 50 different core metrics. The most important include:

Characteristics of the business environment (market attractiveness):

- Market growth (short-term and long-term)
- Market size
- Distribution channels (direct, wholesale, retail, etc.)
- Customer characteristics (purchase amount, frequency, importance, etc.)
- Inflation (materials, energy, labor costs, prices)
- Position in product life cycle

Competitive strength:

- Relative market share (compared to the three largest competitors)
- Relative innovation rate and product line breadth
- Location cost advantage
- Relative marketing effort (salesforce, advertising, promotion)
- Relative market coverage
- Relative product quality
- Service characteristics

Supply chain fitness:

- Investment intensity (investment volume / turnover)
- Extent of vertical integration versus outsourcing
- labor productivity
- Capacity utilization
- Investment mix (fixed versus working capital)
- Overhead efficiency
- Marketing intensity (marketing expenditure / sales)
- Research and development intensity (research and development expenses / sales)

Dynamics of change

- Changes in competitive strengths
- Changes in supply chain fitness

Economic success factors (dependent variables):

- Return on investment (ROI) (profit / tied capital)
- Return on sales (ROS) (profit / sales)
- Real growth

== Key Findings ==
The following factors (among others) demonstrate strong correlation with ROI and ROS:

Investment intensity (negative correlation): Higher investment volume in relation to sales increases depreciation as a proportion of sales, reducing profit margins. Additionally, high fixed assets create pressure to utilize capacity, potentially leading to lower prices and reduced profit margins.

Relative market share (positive correlation): Higher market share enables economies of scale, reducing unit costs through increased production volume, consistent with experience curve effects. Greater market share also increases bargaining power with suppliers.

Relative product quality (positive correlation): Premium products command higher prices and generate greater customer willingness to purchase, increasing sales volume and market share (see above). High-quality products also incur lower complaint and warranty costs.

Overall, the factors surveyed explain approximately 70-75% of the differences in profitability between successful and unsuccessful business units in the PIMS database.

== Analytical Methodologies ==
Companies participating in the program provide detailed information for each strategic business unit. based on this data, PIMS provides several analytical frameworks that translate raw data into strategic intelligence:

Profit Potential Analysis (Par): Taking inspiration from golf, where par indicates the expected number of swings to complete a hole, the Par model predicts an SBU's expected profitability given its strategic position. By evaluating 15 key factors, Par establishes a benchmark profitability ("Par" or "profit potential") for any business. These factors explain up to 75% of variation in profitability between businesses. The model enables statements such as "Businesses like yours typically achieve 12% return on sales. You are currently at 8%, indicating a gap and potential upside of 4% of sales revenue."

Strategic Peer Analysis: This methodology selects businesses in the PIMS database with closely matching strategic profiles (similar scale, market dynamics, comparable competitive position). It contrasts top performers versus laggards within this peer cohort to isolate the drivers of performance gaps, yielding evidence-based targets and pinpointing priority strategic and operational improvements.

The PIMS Cause-Effect Model: This analytical model maps the interdependencies among variables affecting business performance. Rather than identifying isolated factors, it reveals how the system of interdependent variables (market, customer, cost, capital) interacts to shape outcomes like profitability and growth. The model shows how shifts in one part of the system can ripple across the business and how seemingly obvious moves can backfire when system dynamics aren't well understood.

The Operations Room: (application framework) Offered by pims.ai, this is an integrated decision environment that combines a company's operational data with PIMS insights. It quantifies three dimensions: (1) actuality (current performance), (2) capability (achievable performance with existing resources), and (3) potentiality (performance ceiling given strategic repositioning). This enables adaptive decision-making where strategy adjusts continuously to environmental shifts, and acts as the foundation for the entry of a new, digital board room member.

== Academic Foundation ==
PIMS methodologies have been published in peer-reviewed academic literature and leading business journals over six decades, including Harvard Business Review, Strategic Management Journal, and Journal of Marketing. Key publications include:

- Buzzell, R. and Gale, B. (1987). The PIMS Principles: Linking Strategy to Performance. New York: Free Press.
- Farschtschian, P. (2010). Private Equity for the Challenges of the New Era. Campus Verlag, Frankfurt.
- Schoeffler, S., Buzzell, R. and Heany, D. (1974). "Impact of Strategic Planning on Profit Performance." Harvard Business Review, March-April 1974.

The program continues to publish practitioner research exploring cause-effect relationships between strategic choices, market conditions, and financial outcomes.

== Strategic Relevance ==
The PIMS program continues as an active research and advisory initiative through pims.ai, but has potential as an empirical foundation for further modern applications:

AI Research: Clean, normalized variables provide an environment for training world models that learn economic behavior, competitive dynamics, and strategic decision-making from first principles. PIMS is a real-world "economic world model" dataset that cannot be artificially reproduced.

Strategic Decision-Making: PIMS is the empirical backbone that separates evidence-based strategy from plausible-sounding speculation. When AI models claim "businesses should invest more in R&D" or "market share drives profitability," PIMS validates whether claims hold and quantifies when, why, and by how much they apply.

Enterprise Intelligence: PIMS transforms strategic benchmarking from a consultant-dependent, months-long process into a repeatable, data-driven capability. It enables executives to answer: "What performance should I expect?" "What do the best companies in my situation do differently?" with auditable answers grounded in 60 years of research.

M&A and Investment: PIMS provides the only empirical basis for valuing strategic positioning beyond historical financials. PIMS reveals profit potential — what a business should earn given its strategic profile. This identifies mispriced assets (underperformers with structural advantages) and exposes overvalued targets (current performance exceeds sustainable potential).

== Criticisms and Limitations ==
Causation versus correlation: A primary criticism is that correlation does not imply causation. The program identified a statistically significant relationship between profitability and market share, but this correlation does not definitively establish a "true" causal relationship. High market share may yield high profitability, but high profitability could also enable acquisition of market share, or a third factor could cause both. In the multivariate correlation analysis, high market share was associated with high profits, but high profits could have been associated with high market share, or a third factor common to both could have caused the correlation. Many analysts believe that it is possible to use a statistical causality test to determine causation, but if the whole problem is that correlation is insufficient to determine causation in the first place, then how can using another correlation, which is what is used in the tests, determine causation. The program has addressed these concerns through longitudinal time-series analysis enabled by multi-year data collection per SBU, which can provide stronger evidence for causal relationships than cross-sectional data alone, though this remains a methodological limitation of empirical research. The PIMS Cause-Effect Model explores the causal relationships between the relationships between PIMS variables in further detail.

→ In connection with the market share, already indicated and frequent allegations that correlations are used in the PIMS investigations to draw conclusions about causal relationships, i.e. correlation is equated with causality. However, this problem is too obvious not to have been examined in detail during the development of the PIMS program. Backhaus et al. formulate this aptly: "The primary field of application of regression analysis is the investigation of causal relationships (cause-effect relationships), which we can also refer to as 'The more the' relationships". Backhaus et al. (2006), p. 46 (Emphasis in the original.) These authors then add the following: "It should be emphasized here that neither regression analysis nor other statistical methods can prove causalities beyond doubt. Rather, regression analysis can only prove correlations between variables. This is a necessary but not yet sufficient condition for causality." Backhaus et al. (2006), p.48 f. Within the framework of the PIMS studies, it was thus possible to determine causalities with the help of time series analyses due to the availability of data over longer periods. See, for example, Barylite (1994), p. 61. Correlations in this sense, including in the PIMS program, initially give nothing other than a reason to investigate possible causalities substantiated and intensively.''

Age and type of data concerns: Critics have argued that the database reflects the program's General Electric origins, with over-representation from pre-2000, North American, manufacturing-intensive businesses. However, data has continuously expanded across sectors and geographies from participating companies, and the program maintains that its conclusions have proven stable over time. As of December 2025, the database includes over 4,300 SBUs with data extending beyond the original collection period.

→ The PIMS master database at the heart of the PIMS program now includes more than 25,000 years of business experience across a broad spectrum of industries worldwide. These are more than 90% of the companies to be processed. About one-third of them manufacture consumer goods, 15% manufacture capital goods. The remaining business units are suppliers of raw materials and semi-finished products, components or accessories for industry and commerce. Trade and services companies account for less than 10% of total companies and yet represent a fairly large sample (over 250) of strategic business units in this category. About half of the business units in the PIMS database market their products or services nationally in the United States or Canada, while 11% serve regional markets in North America. European companies are also numerous today, with around 1,000 business units from continental European countries and 600 from the UK.

Data collection bias: Critics have argued that the database is weighted toward large companies, as smaller entrepreneurial firms are less likely to pay the associated consulting fees and provide detailed survey data. Mintzberg (1998) claims that because the database features a large representation of large established firms, it is more suitable as a technique for assessing the state of "being there rather than getting there" (page 99). Given the program's ambitious goal of identifying 'laws of the marketplace' that apply across industries, the sampling strategy's representativeness is a key consideration for interpreting results.

Market definition and survivor bias: Tellis and Golder (1996) argue that respondents can describe their markets narrowly to give the appearance of high market share. They believe this self-reporting bias makes conclusions suspect. They also highlighted concerns that no defunct companies were included at the time of their writing, leading to "survivor bias". PIMS practitioners counter that, aside from the act of inflating market share figures being counter-productive for participants to receive useful insights and thus not popular, PIMS consultants have continuously been involved in the data gathering process, ensuring data quality and veracity.

Homogeneity assumption: A criticism of the PIMS program concerns its reliance on a homogeneity assumption — the idea that all firms, regardless of industry, are drawn from a single underlying statistical population. Critics argue that cross-sectional econometric models implicitly assume identical distributions across industries. If this assumption is false, then pooling firms from heterogeneous industries obscures structural differences in competitive dynamics, and the estimated “laws of the marketplace” may be invalid. However, this critique overlooks the central purpose of the PIMS database: to identify broad, cross-industry regularities in the determinants of strategic performance, using variables that exist and apply to all industries. Empirically, PIMS has consistently shown that firms with above-average market share, product quality, labour productivity (and others) achieve higher returns across a wide spectrum of sectors. These relationships hold in industries as diverse as automotive, food manufacturing, and heavy industrial production, suggesting the existence of market-agnostic strategic principles grounded in universal economic mechanisms such as economies of scale, perceived quality advantages, and productivity-driven cost efficiencies. Thus, while industry heterogeneity undeniably exists, the stable cross-industry trends identified by PIMS weaken the claim that pooling data is inherently inappropriate, and instead support the view that PIMS captures strategic patterns that are sufficiently generalisable to be analytically meaningful.

== PIMS and pims.ai ==
Following its integration into pims.ai, the PIMS programme continues as a leading empirical research initiative on business strategy and performance. Since 2026, it has been headquartered in London and St. Gallen, pims.ai applies the PIMS® evidence base — covering over 25,000 business years of data from approximately 4,300 strategic business units (SBUs) — to deliver predictive analytics and AI-assisted management tools for strategic decision-making and organisational transformation.

The programme maintains its analytical foundation in the PIMS variables, which capture the key relationships between market conditions, competitive position, cost structures, and financial outcomes. These variables have demonstrated consistent explanatory power, accounting for up to 75% of the observed variation in business performance across industries and geographies, and dictating the "laws of the marketplace".

Today, PIMS® data and methodologies underpin a range of pims.ai solutions, including Strategic Benchmarking and Customer Value Analysis (CVA®), which are used by multinational firms across sectors. A related, industry-specific programme — PIMS® Global Lubricants & Greases Benchmarking — was established in the early 1990s and remains the largest operational benchmarking initiative in its field, with over 200 participating plants in each cycle. The PIMS® programme continues to serve as a cornerstone of evidence-based management science, supporting organisations in making data-driven strategic decisions rather than relying on intuition.

== See also ==
- Strategic management
- Marketing strategies
- Business model
- Benchmarking
