= Xuxa só para Baixinhos Vol. 10 – Baixinhos, Bichinhos e + =

Xuxa só para Baixinhos Vol. 10 – Baixinhos, Bichinhos e Mais

Studio album by Xuxa
- Released: August 29, 2010
- Recorded: 2010
- Genre: Children's music
- Length: 54:41
- Label: Sony Music
- Producers: Luiz Cláudio Moreira; Mônica Muniz

Xuxa chronology
Só para Baixinhos Vol. 9 (2009)	Xuxa só para Baixinhos Vol. 10 – Baixinhos, Bichinhos e Mais (2010)	Só para Baixinhos Vol. 11 (2011)

Singles from Xuxa só Para Baixinhos 10
- 1. "Peito, Estala, Bate" Released: 2010; 2. "Choco Chocolate" Released: 2010; 3. "A Dança do Pinguim" Released: 2010

Xuxa so para Baixinhos 10 (transl. Only for Children Ten – Kids, Animals and More) is the thirty-third studio album by Brazilian recording artist Xuxa, released on August 29, 2010, by Sony Music as the tenth album in the Só Para Baixinhos series.

== Release and reception ==
Xuxa só Para Baixinhos 10 - Baixinhos, Bichinhos e + was released on August 29, 2010. It was released in the formats DVD, DVD and CD and Blu-ray, this was the first album of the collection Só Para Baixinhos not to have the physical version in CD. This was the second album in the collection Só Para Baixinhos released by Sony Music after Xuxa did not renew his contract with the record company Som Livre, in which he had released the first eight volumes of the series. In the year 2011, the album was released on Blu-ray by Sony Music.

Xuxa só Para Baixinhos 10 - Baixinhos, Bichinhos e + sold more than 150,000 copies receiving triple platinum certification, the DVD of this album was one of the best selling of 2010. The singles were "Peito, Estala, Bate", "A Dança do Pinguim" and "Choco Chocolate".

== Track listing ==
Xuxa só para Baixinhos 10 – CD edition
No.	Title	Writer(s)	Length
1.	"Choco Chocolate" (Chocolate (Choco Choco))	Bruce Hammond Earlam and John Ned Irving (translated by Vanessa Alves)	3:17
2.	"Peito, Estala, Bate"	Ary Sperling and Vanessa Alves	2:20
3.	"A Dança Do Pinguim" (Tem Que Dançar Assim)	Vanessa Alves and Maurício Gaetani	2:14
4.	"O Txutxucão Já Chegou"	Ary Sperling, Vanessa Alves and Rogério Meanda	2:07
5.	"Pizza"	Vanessa Alves and Rafael Sperling	2:15
6.	"Pot-Pourri Comidas (Comer Comer / Pipoca / Quem Quer Pão)"	Luis Gómez-Escolar and Honorio Herrero (translated by Elzo Augusto) in "Comer Comer"; Álvaro Socci and Cláudio Matta in "Pipoca"; Tuza and J Corrêa in "Quem Quer Pão?"	3:34
7.	"Salada de Frutas"	Vanessa Alves and Leonardo Sperling	1:52
8.	"Pot-Pourri Bichos (O Elefante Feliz / Serenata Do Grilo / Croc Croc)"	Michael Sullivan and Carlos Colla in "O Elefante Feliz"; Michael Sullivan and Dudu Falcão in "Serenata do Grilo"; Rubens Alexandre in "Croc Croc"	4:07
9.	"Você Vai Gostar De Mim"	Marcelo Brandão and Cláudio Leite	2:18
10.	"Sopa De Letrinhas"	Ary Sperling, Vanessa Alves and Rogério Meanda	1:53
11.	"Massinha"	Vanessa Alves, Leandro Barros and Kátia Pereira	2:38
12.	"Careta De Limão"	Vanessa Alves and Leonardo Sperling	1:53
13.	"A Lebre e a Tartaruga"	Vanessa Alves and Leonardo Sperling	2:01
14.	"A Canção Do Elefante" (The Elephant Song)	Eric Herman and Roseann Endres (translated by Vanessa Alves)	3:32
15.	"O Leãozinho" (featuring Maria Gadú)	Caetano Veloso	3:15
16.	"Hora De Sonhar"	Ary Sperling and Vanessa Alves	3:32
Total length:			42:57

Xuxa só para Baixinhos 10 – DVD Edition
No.	Title	Writer(s)	Length
1.	"Intro"		0:47
2.	"Pot-Pourri Comidas (Comer Comer / Pipoca / Quem Quer Pão?)"	Luis Gómez-Escolar and Honorio Herrero (translated by Elzo Augusto) in "Comer Comer"; Álvaro Socci and Cláudio Matta in "Pipoca"; Tuza and J Corrêa in "Quem Quer Pão?"	3:38
3.	"Passage (Penguin)"		0:30
4.	"A Dança Do Pinguim" (Tem Que Dançar Assim)	Vanessa Alves and Maurício Gaetani	2:18
5.	"Passage (Healthy Meals)"		0:30
6.	"Salada De Frutas"	Vanessa Alves and Leonardo Sperling	1:57
7.	"Passage (Lettuce)"		0:28
8.	"A Lebre e a Tartaruga"	Vanessa Alves and Leonardo Sperling	2:06
9.	"Passage (Lemon)"		0:27
10.	"Careta De Limão"	Vanessa Alves and Leonardo Sperling	1:53
11.	"Passage (Elephant)"		0:32
12.	"A Canção Do Elefante" (The Elephant Song)	Eric Herman and Roseann Endres (translated by Vanessa Alves)	3:39
13.	"Passage (Dance)"		0:30
14.	"Peito, Estala, Bate"	Ary Sperling and Vanessa Alves	2:25
15.	"Passage (Chocolate)"		0:28
16.	"Choco Chocolate" (Chocolate (Choco Choco))	Bruce Hammond Earlam and John Ned Irving (translated by Vanessa Alves)	3:21
17.	"Passage (Animals)"		0:27
18.	"Pot-Pourri Bichos (O Elefante Feliz / Serenata do Grilo / Croc Croc)"	Michael Sullivan and Carlos Colla in "O Elefante Feliz"; Michael Sullivan and Dudu Falcão in "Serenata do Grilo"; Rubens Alexandre in "Croc Croc"	4:11
19.	"Passage (Pizza)"		0:27
20.	"Pizza"	Vanessa Alves and Rafael Sperling	2:20
21.	"Passage (Dog)"		0:29
22.	"O Txutxucão Já Chegou"	Ary Sperling, Vanessa Alves and Rogério Meanda	2:13
23.	"Passage (Differences)"		0:32
24.	"Você Vai Gostar De Mim"	Marcelo Brandão and Cláudio Leite	2:22
25.	"Passage (Dolphin)"		0:30
26.	"Massinha"	Vanessa Alves, Leandro Barros and Kátia Pereira	2:33
27.	"Passage (Soup)"		0:25
28.	"Sopa De Letrinhas"	Ary Sperling, Vanessa Alves and Rogério Meanda	1:58
29.	"Passage (Lion)"		0:28
30.	"O Leãozinho" (featuring Maria Gadú)	Caetano Veloso	3:21
31.	"Passage (Dreaming)"		0:27
32.	"Hora De Sonhar"	Ary Sperling and Vanessa Alves	3:37
33.	"Credits (Você Vai Gostar De Mim (Instrumental) / Instrumental Suite)"		12:48
Total length:			54:41

== Personnel ==
- General and Artistic Direction: Xuxa Meneghel
- Direction: Paulo de Barros
- Production: Luiz Cláudio Moreira and Mônica Muniz
- Production Director: Junior Porto
- Musical production: Ary Sperling
- Musical Coordination: Vanessa Alves
- Cinematography: André Horta
- Set design: Lueli Antunes
- Art Production: Flávia Cristofaro
- Graphic design: Duda Souza and Rodrigo Lima
- Stop Motion Animation: Quiá Rodrigues
- 3D Animation: Valerycka Rizzo
- Choreographies: Wagner Menezes (Fly)
- Costume: Cristina Gross
- Make up: Fábio Morgado
- Edition: Tainá Diniz
- Finishing: Melissa Flores
- Produzido por: Sony Music e Xuxa Produções
- Distribuição: Sony Music
- Realização: Xuxa Produções

== Certifications ==
Region	Certification	Certified units/sales
Brazil (Pro-Música Brasil) DVD	3× Platinum	150,000^{*}
Brazil (Pro-Música Brasil)	Gold	40,000^{‡}
^{*} Sales figures based on certification alone.^{‡} Sales+streaming figures based on certification alone.
