= Juegos de lectura en voz alta =

Juegos de lectura en voz alta is an Argentine teacher's book by Luis Pescetti. It was first published in 1999.
