= La vida y otros síntomas =

La vida y otros síntomas (Life and Other Symptoms) is an Argentine book cowritten by the writer and musician Luis Pescetti and the cartoonist Rudy. It is the second and final book in the series Neurotics Online.

The book was published in 2000 by Editorial Norma in Bogotá, Colombia, and is distributed in Mexico.

== Summary ==
Similar to the first book of the series, it is a humorous compilation of emails between two men who discuss quotidian issues such as: cholesterol, the passage of time, psychotherapy (which helps them deal with their attacks of neurosis), their partners and children, travel, cell phones, weddings, and, underlying all of these themes, the “obligation” to be happy.

== See also ==
- Neuróticos on line (Neurotics Online)
