= Natacha (novel) =

1998 children's book by Luis Pescetti

- Author: Luis Pescetti
- Illustrator: O'Kif; Pablo Fernandez
- Language: Spanish
- Series: Natacha series
- Subject: Girl's adventure
- Genre: Children
- Publisher: Alfaguara
- Publication date: 1998
- Publication place: Argentina
- Media type: Print
- ISBN: 9789870411215
- Followed by: La tarea según Natacha

Natacha is a children's book first published in 1998, the first in a series of books where Natacha is the protagonist. It was written by Luis Pescetti, Argentine writer and musician, whose works are mainly intended for children. The book was adapted to the theater by Barbara Raimondi.

== Publication history ==
The book was published in 1998 by Alfaguara in its orange series for children 10 years and older, appearing in Argentina, Mexico and other countries in South America. Two years later it was issued by the same publisher in the "Alfaguay" collection exclusively for Spain. Two versions of the book have been issued, the first in 1998 illustrated by O'Kif (1998), and the second in 2008 illustrated by Pablo Fernandez. The Pablo Fernandez version of the book includes 4-mini posters, and was issued as part of a set with the other Natacha books that he illustrated on the tenth anniversary of the first appearance of Natacha.

The book was published in the United States by Santillana in 2008 (ISBN 970580494X).

== Synopsis ==
Natacha has a mother who invents tales of monsters, a friend Pati, who with Natacha are "The Pearl Girls" and a dog, Rafles, a little destroyer. Natacha is a girl who never tires of asking questions. Her curiosity, which is shared by her friend Pati, drives her parents and other adults to despair. Sometimes they have to count to ten to calm down. In this book Natacha helps to cook by making a chocolate cake, but in place of the main ingredient she uses mud. During a film she asks her mother so many questions that she cannot follow the plot. In other chapters she writes a poem, but needs her mother's help with spelling. Her mother tells her stories about monsters of the night and her dog "Rafles" meets various disasters.

== Miscellaneous ==
Natacha is, along with El ciudadano de mis zapatos (The citizen of my shoes), one of the works by Luis Pescetti that have been adapted to theater. The Argentine Director Barbara Raimondi faithfully adapted the book to a play, apart from changing Natacha's best friend from Pati (Patricia) to Patri (Patrick) and adding stories to link the episodes together.

Natasha's name was taken from a student who was taught by the author (he taught music in preschool and primary), who was just as curious and inquisitive. The other characters and situations in the book were taken from the author's experiences as a child. He used the phrase "I'm going somewhere to do something ..." in infancy and quoted it on his recordings and in his radio program Hola Luis.

This is the only book by Luis Pescetti that was translated into Catalan, issued only in Spain. The Catalan book is called La Nataixa.

The tenth anniversary of publication of the first edition of Natacha was celebrated in July 2007. The author and the publisher put on a series of concerts by Luis Pescetti called "Useless to insist". The poster proclaims "10 years of Natacha" and is framed with Natacha's characteristic pigtails and fringe.

Books in the series are:

- Natacha
- La tarea según Natacha ()
- ¡Buenísimo, Natacha!
- Chat, Natacha, chat
- Bituín bituín Natacha
- Querido diario (Natacha)
- La enciclopedia de las Chicas Perla
- Te amo, lectura (Natacha)
- Nuestro planeta, Natacha
