= Xuxa só para Baixinhos 12 – É Pra Dançar =

Xuxa só para Baixinhos Vol. 12 – É Pra Dançar

Studio album by Xuxa
- Released: June 29, 2013
- Recorded: 2012
- Genres: Children's music; dance pop
- Length: 48:07
- Label: Sony Music
- Producers: Luiz Cláudio Moreira; Mônica Muniz

Xuxa chronology
Só para Baixinhos Vol. 11 (2011)	Xuxa só para Baixinhos Vol. 12 – É Pra Dançar (2013)	Era Uma Vez Vol. 2 (2014)

Singles from Xuxa só Para Baixinhos 12
- 1. "Eu Quero Festa" Released: 2013

Xuxa só para Baixinhos 12 or É Pra Dançar (also known as XSPB 12) (transl. Only For Children Twelve - It's For Dancing) is the thirty-fifth studio album by Brazilian recording artist Xuxa Meneghel, released on June 29, 2013, by Sony Music. It is the twelfth album in the collection Só Para Baixinhos.

== Release and reception ==
Xuxa só para Baixinhos 12 - É Pra Dançar, was released on June 29, 2013. It was released in the formats DVD, CD and Blu-ray, this was the second album of the collection Só Para Baixinhos not to have the physical version in CD, DVD versions and DVD and CD were released in Digipak format. This was the fourth and last album in the collection Só Para Baixinhos, released by Sony Music, after Xuxa renewed his contract with the record company Som Livre, which released the first eight volumes. It is the XSPB with more controversies in production. The project for the album would be for 2012, but a few weeks later it was announced that the album would not be released in 2012, and that it would be released in April 2013 but suffered another delay and was released in late June 2013.

XSPB 12 sold in three months 50,000 copies, getting certified platinum.

== Awards ==
É Pra Dançar was nominated for the Best Latin Children's Album in 15th Annual Latin Grammy Awards in 2014.

== Track listing ==
Xuxa só para Baixinhos 12 – CD edition
No.	Title	Writer(s)	Length
1.	"Eu Quero Festa"	Vanessa Alves; Leonardo Sperling	1:58
2.	"Xuxamego" (featuring Michel Teló)	Vanessa Alves; Rannieri Oliveira; Val Andrade	2:36
3.	"É o Frevo, é o Funk" (featuring Buchecha)	Vanessa Alves; Tadeu Santiago	2:41
4.	"Paratiparara"	Vanessa Alves; Pe Lu	2:38
5.	"Pé Com pé"	Vanessa Alves; Maurício Gaetani	1:49
6.	"Como é Bom Ser Criança" (featuring Alexandre Pires)	Vanessa Aves; Mariana Féo; Roberto Lopes	2:34
7.	"O Txutxucão Mandou"	Vanessa Alves; Maurício Gaetani	2:12
8.	"Pula, Meu Baixinho"	Vanessa Alves; Maurício Gaetani	4:03
9.	"HipopotaMOIO"	Vanessa Alves; Maurício Gaetani	2:05
10.	"Mil Maneiras"	Vanessa Alves; Ary Sperling	1:47
11.	"Eu Adoro Dançar" (Duncan) (featuring Daniel and Lara Camillo)	Pat Alexander; Version: Vanessa Alves	2:11
12.	"Piniquinho"	Vanessa Alves; Maurício Gaetani	1:34
13.	"Girassol"	Vanessa Alves; Maurício Gaetani	1:55
14.	"Sonhando dá Pra Dançar"	Vanessa Alves; Leonardo Sperling	2:13
15.	"Lullaby XSPB"	Vanessa Alves; Maurício Gaetani	2:12
Total length:			32:34

Xuxa só para Baixinhos 12 – DVD edition
No.	Title	Writer(s)	Length
1.	"Introdução"		0:15
2.	"Eu Quero Festa"	Vanessa Alves; Leonardo Sperling	2:53
3.	"Passage (Dogs)"		0:28
4.	"O Txutxucão Mandou"	Vanessa Alves; Maurício Gaetani	2:17
5.	"Passage (Dancing Country)"		0:18
6.	"Xuxamego" (featuring Michel Teló)	Vanessa Alves; Rannieri Oliveira; Val Andrade	2:51
7.	"Passage (Inside, On, Off)"		0:31
8.	"Pé Com pé"	Vanessa Alves; Maurício Gaetani	1:54
9.	"Passage (MOIO)"		0:15
10.	"HipopotaMOIO"	Vanessa Alves; Maurício Gaetani	2:11
11.	"Passage (Vowels)"		0:19
12.	"Paratiparara"	Vanessa Alves; Pe Lu	2:43
13.	"Passage (Dancing Funk)"		0:34
14.	"É o Frevo, é o Funk" (com Buchecha)	Vanessa Alves; Tadeu Santiago	2:46
15.	"Passage (Numbers)"		1:06
16.	"Pula, Meu Baixinho"	Vanessa Alves; Maurício Gaetani	2:08
17.	"Passing (Skipping)"		0:18
18.	"Eu Adoro Dançar" (Duncan) (featuring Daniel and Lara Camillo)	Pat Alexander; Version: Vanessa Alves	2:16
19.	"Passage (Sambando)"		0:20
20.	"Como é Bom Ser Criança" (featuring Alexandre Pires)	Vanessa Aves; Mariana Féo; Roberto Lopes	2:40
21.	"Mil Maneiras (Musical Passage)"	Vanessa Alves; Ary Sperling	1:47
22.	"Girassol"	Vanessa Alves; Maurício Gaetani	1:55
23.	"Mil Maneiras (Musical Passage)"	Vanessa Alves; Ary Sperling	0:28
24.	"Piniquinho"	Vanessa Alves; Maurício Gaetani	1:42
25.	"Mil Maneiras (Musical Passage)"	Vanessa Alves; Ary Sperling	0:28
26.	"Sonhando dá Pra Dançar"	Vanessa Alves; Leonardo Sperling	2:18
27.	"Passage (Prayed)"		0:38
28.	"Lullaby XSPB"	Vanessa Alves; Maurício Gaetani	2:18
29.	"Credits" (Eu Quero Festa / Girassol / O Txutxucão Mandou / Pula, Meu Baixinho (Instrumental)		8:39
Total length:			48:07

== Personnel ==
- General and Artistic Direction: Xuxa Meneghel
- Direction: Paulo de Barros
- Production: Luiz Cláudio Moreira and Mônica Muniz
- Production Director: Junior Porto
- Musical production: Guto Graça Melo
- Musical Coordination: Vanessa Alves
- Cinematography: André Horta
- Set design: Lueli Antunes and Leila Chaves
- Art Production: Flávia Cristofaro
- Choreography Direction: Wagner Menezes (Fly)
- Costume: Marcelo Cavalcanti
- Make up: Fábio Morgado
- Edition: Paulo de Barros and Rodrigo Mantega
- Finishing: Bernardo Varela
- Concept Design and Animation: Rodrigo Mantega
- Post Production Coordination: Helo Lopes
- Menu and Extras: Vinícius Santana Pinto
- Sound Design: Pedro Sarmento
- Authorization and Programming: Junior Laks
- Orthographic Review: Tainá Diniz and Rita Godoy
- Subtitles and 3D Animation: Luís Cláudio Barbosa
- Text Editing: Alexandre Pereira, Fausto Villanova and Fábio Pontual
- Image Editing: Rodrigo Magalhães, Ricardo Mello, Evandro Fraga and José Adelson Abreu
- Audio Editing: Breno Muniz, Vanildo Barreto, David Diniz, Givaldo Severo and Marcelo Roldão
- Sound engineer: Marcos Carvalho
- Sound technician: Octávio Luiz Lobo
- Video Operator: Sandro Gama
- Audio Operator: João Henrique Medeiros
- Microphone Operator: Cláudio Cerdeira
- Electrician: Rogério Kennedy ''Fuca''
- Lighting Assistants: Dimas de Souza, Luciano de Andrade, Vicente Gomes dos Santos, Mário Rinaldi and Luís Alberto
- Set design: Leila Araújo e Valéria Violeta
- Scenography Assistant: Paulo Flaksman
- Hair: Márcia Elias
- Seamstress: Ana Lúcia Costa
- Description: Tinácio and Sérgia Maria Lima
- Make up: Luciene Araújo
- Choreography: Wagner Meneses (Fly)
- Adapting Choreographies: Cathia Delmaschio
- Choreography Assistants: Ana Cecília Calderón and Fabrilla Cruz
- Press office: Tatiana Maranhão
- Security chief: Magno Jesus
- Property security: Demilson de Oliveira and Maurício Ferreira
- Seguranças: Vítor Lopes and Márcio Avelino
- Fire brigade: Amilton dos Santos
- Nurse: Cíntia Rosa
- Cleaning assistant: Lourdes Fontoura
- Overall coordination: Andréa Lisboa
- Customer Service - Mega Studios: Ariadne Mazzetti, Patrícia Trad and Rita Vilhena
- Commercial assistant: Cris Moraes
- Effects Coordinator: Robson Sartori
- Colorist: Gerson Silva
- Assistant of Telecine: Rodrigo Mantega
- Mixing and Mastering: Lulu Farah
- Final Cut Pro: Lillian Stock Bonzi
- Composition and Effects: Rodrigo Kioshi, Gabriel Tinoco, Júnior Fernandes and Alex Barreiro
- Online Edition: Francinaldo Lemos, Douglas Terciano, Valdo Caetano, Carlos Baptista and Eugen Pfister
- Graphic project: Tiago Martins e Felipe Gois
- Review: Marcos Lima
- Final art: Dani Dias
- Graphic Supervision: Gustavo Velasco
- Graphic Coordination: Marciso (Pena) Carvalho

== Certifications ==
Region	Certification	Certified units/sales
Brazil (Pro-Música Brasil) DVD	Platinum	50,000^{*}
^{*} Sales figures based on certification alone.
