= Neuróticos on line =

Neuróticos on line (Neurotics Online) is a 1998 book cowritten by the writer and musician Luis Pescetti and the cartoonist Rudy. It is the first book of two in the series of the same name.

It was published in Buenos Aires, Argentina by the Instituto Movilizador de Fondos Cooperativos (Cooperative Funds Mobilizing Institute) in the collection Desde la gente (From the People).

== Summary ==
The book is a compilation of emails between Pescetti and Rudy, who discuss themes of everyday life in a humorous way.

== See also ==
- La vida y otros síntomas (Life and Other Symptoms, the second book in the series)
