= Caperucita Roja (tal como se lo contaron a Jorge) =

Book written by Luis Pescetti

- Author: Luis Pescetti
- Original title: Caperucita Roja (tal como se lo contaron a Jorge)
- Illustrator: O'Kif
- Language: Spanish
- Genre: Children's picture book
- Publisher: Alfaguara
- Publication date: 1996
- Publication place: Argentina

Caperucita Roja (tal como se lo contaron a Jorge) [Little Red Riding Hood (as was told to Jorge)] is a book written by Luis Pescetti, Argentine writer and musician.

This book is an adaptation of the traditional tale of Little Red Riding Hood.

It is the shortest of all of the books written by Luis Pescetti (32 pages, in a small book, and most are illustrations), and it took the least amount of time to write (½ hour).

It was published by Alfaguara in Buenos Aires, Argentina, in 1996; illustrated by O'Kif, and simultaneously published in Venezuela, Colombia, Mexico, Peru, Bolivia, the United States and Spain, by the same publisher.

== Plot ==
Basically, it's about how Jorge's father tells the story of Little Red Riding Hood to his son, told in the original version and based in a time somewhat ancient. But Jorge, an imaginative boy, recreates the story, based in the present time and with somewhat futuristic elements.

In each passage of the story, the father appears, telling the story to Jorge, and two thought bubbles: one with the passage imagined by the father, illuminated with sepia tones to give the idea of antiquity, and the other is the story imagined by Jorge, illuminated in full color. The shapes of the thought bubbles and the expressions of Jorge and his father are also important.

== Awards ==
- National Award “Cuadro de Honor” [Honor Roll] of Children's Literature. Argentina, 1997.
- Highlighted by the ALIJA (the chapter in Argentina of IBBY {International Board of Books for Young People}), category “Libro total” [whole book]. Argentina, 1998.
- Mentioned in “The White Ravens” of the Internationale Jugendbibliothek (International Youth Library). Munich, Germany, 1998.
