= Benchmarking =

Comparing business metrics in an industry

Benchmarking is the practice of comparing business processes and performance metrics to industry bests and best practices from other companies. Dimensions typically measured are quality, time and cost.

Benchmarking is used to measure performance using a specific indicator (cost per unit of measure, productivity per unit of measure, cycle time of x per unit of measure or defects per unit of measure) resulting in a metric of performance that is then compared to others.

Also referred to as “best practice benchmarking” or “process benchmarking,” this process is used in management, in which organizations evaluate various aspects of their processes in relation to the processes of best-practice companies, usually within a peer group defined for comparison. This allows organizations to develop plans to make improvements or adopt specific best practices, usually with the aim of increasing some aspect of performance. Benchmarking may be a one-off event, but it is often treated as a continuous process in which organizations continually seek to improve their practices.

In project management benchmarking can also support the selection, planning and delivery of projects.

In the process of best practice benchmarking, management identifies the best firms in their industry, or in another industry where similar processes exist, and compares the results and processes of those studied (the "targets") to one's own results and processes. In this way, they learn how well the targets perform and, more importantly, the business processes that explain why these firms are successful. According to National Council on Measurement in Education, benchmark assessments are short assessments used by teachers at various times throughout the school year to monitor student progress in some area of the school curriculum. These also are known as interim government.

In 1994, one of the first technical journals named Benchmarking was published.

== History ==
An early example of benchmarking is the Auerbach Corporation's Standard EDP Reports, which were first developed in 1962.

In 2008, a comprehensive survey on benchmarking was commissioned by The Global Benchmarking Network, a network of benchmarking centres representing 22 countries.

1. Mission and Vision Statements and Customer (Client) Surveys are the most used (by 77% of organizations) of 20 improvement tools, followed by SWOT analysis (strengths, weaknesses, opportunities, and threats) (72%), and Informal Benchmarking (68%). Performance Benchmarking was used by 49% and Best Practice Benchmarking by 39%.
2. The tools that are likely to increase in popularity the most over the next three years are Performance Benchmarking, Informal Benchmarking, SWOT, and Best Practice Benchmarking. Over 60% of organizations that are not currently using these tools indicated they are likely to use them in the next three years. Benchmarking mainly depends on SWOT analysis and will also be using in future for almost 4–5 years.

== Procedure ==
There is no single benchmarking process that has been universally adopted. The wide appeal and acceptance of benchmarking has led to the emergence of benchmarking methodologies. One seminal book is Boxwell's Benchmarking for Competitive Advantage (1994). The first book on benchmarking, written and published by Kaiser Associates, is a practical guide and offers a seven-step approach. Robert Camp (who wrote one of the earliest books on benchmarking in 1989) developed a 12-stage approach to benchmarking.

The 12 stage methodology consists of:

1. Select subject
2. Define the process
3. Identify potential partners
4. Identify data sources
5. Collect data and select all partners
6. Determine the gap
7. Establish process differences
8. Target future performance
9. Communicate
10. Adjust goal
11. Implement
12. Review and recalibrate

The following is an example of a typical benchmarking methodology:

- Identify problem areas: Because benchmarking can be applied to any business process or function, a range of research techniques may be required. They include informal conversations with customers, employees, or suppliers; exploratory research techniques such as focus groups; or in-depth marketing research, quantitative research, surveys, questionnaires, re-engineering analysis, process mapping, quality control variance reports, financial ratio analysis, or simply reviewing cycle times or other performance indicators. Before embarking on comparison with other organizations it is essential to know the organization's function and processes; base lining performance provides a point against which improvement effort can be measured.
- Identify other industries that have similar processes: For instance, if one were interested in improving hand-offs in addiction treatment one would identify other fields that also have hand-off challenges. These could include air traffic control, cell phone switching between towers, transfer of patients from surgery to recovery rooms.
- Identify organizations that are leaders in these areas: Look for the very best in any industry and in any country. Consult customers, suppliers, financial analysts, trade associations, and magazines to determine which companies are worthy of study.
- Survey companies for measures and practices: Companies target specific business processes using detailed surveys of measures and practices used to identify business process alternatives and leading companies. Surveys are typically masked to protect confidential data by neutral associations and consultants.
- Visit the "best practice" companies to identify leading edge practices: Companies typically agree to mutually exchange information beneficial to all parties in a benchmarking group and share the results within the group.
- Implement new and improved business practices: Take the leading edge practices and develop implementation plans which include identification of specific opportunities, funding the project and selling the ideas to the organization for the purpose of gaining demonstrated value from the process.

== Cost ==
The three main types of costs in benchmarking are:

- Visit Costs - This includes hotel rooms, travel costs, meals, a token gift, and lost labor time.
- Time Costs - Members of the benchmarking team will be investing time in researching problems, finding exceptional companies to study, visits, and implementation. This will take them away from their regular tasks for part of each day so additional staff might be required.
- Benchmarking Database Costs - Organizations that institutionalize benchmarking into their daily procedures find it is useful to create and maintain a database of best practices and the companies associated with each best practice now.

The cost of benchmarking can substantially be reduced through utilizing the many internet resources that have sprung up over the last few years. These aim to capture benchmarks and best practices from organizations, business sectors and countries to make the benchmarking process much quicker and cheaper.

== Technical/product benchmarking ==
The technique initially used to compare existing corporate strategies with a view to achieving the best possible performance in new situations (see above), has recently been extended to the comparison of technical products. This process is usually referred to as "technical benchmarking" or "product benchmarking". Its use is well-developed within the automotive industry ("automotive benchmarking"), where it is vital to design products that match precise user expectations, at minimal cost, by applying the best technologies available worldwide. Data is obtained by fully disassembling existing cars and their systems. Such analyses were initially carried out in-house by car makers and their suppliers. However, as these analyses are expensive, they are increasingly being outsourced to companies who specialize in this area. Outsourcing has enabled a drastic decrease in costs for each company (by cost sharing) and the development of efficient tools (standards, software).

== Types ==
Benchmarking can be internal (comparing performance between different groups or teams within an organization) or external (comparing performance with companies in a specific industry or across industries). Within these broader categories, there are three specific types of benchmarking:

1. Process benchmarking,
2. Performance benchmarking, and
3. Strategic benchmarking.

These can be further detailed as follows:

- Process benchmarking - the initiating firm focuses its observation and investigation of business processes with a goal of identifying and observing the best practices from one or more benchmark firms. Activity analysis will be required where the objective is to benchmark cost and efficiency; increasingly applied to back-office processes where outsourcing may be a consideration. Benchmarking is appropriate in nearly every case where process redesign or improvement is to be undertaking so long as the cost of the study does not exceed the expected benefit.
- Financial benchmarking - performing a financial analysis and comparing the results in an effort to assess your overall competitiveness and productivity.
- Benchmarking from an investor perspective - extending the benchmarking universe to also compare to peer companies that can be considered alternative investment opportunities from the perspective of an investor.
- Benchmarking in the public sector - functions as a tool for improvement and innovation in public administration, where state organizations invest efforts and resources to achieve quality, efficiency and effectiveness of the services they provide.
- Performance benchmarking - allows the initiator firm to assess their competitive position by comparing products and services with those of target firms.
- Product benchmarking - the process of designing new products or upgrades to current ones. This process can sometimes involve reverse engineering which is taking apart competitors products to find strengths and weaknesses.
- Strategic benchmarking- involves observing how others compete. This type is usually not industry specific, meaning it is best to look at other industries, i.e. Strategic Benchmarking with the help of (Profit impact of marketing strategy).
- Functional benchmarking - a company will focus its benchmarking on a single function to improve the operation of that particular function. Complex functions such as Human Resources, Finance and Accounting and Information and Communication Technology are unlikely to be directly comparable in cost and efficiency terms and may need to be disaggregated into processes to make valid comparison.
- Best-in-class benchmarking - involves studying the leading competitor or the company that best carries out a specific function.
- Operational benchmarking embraces everything from staffing and productivity to office flow and analysis of procedures performed.
- Energy benchmarking - process of collecting, analysing and relating energy performance data of comparable activities with the purpose of evaluating and comparing performance between or within entities. Entities can include processes, buildings or companies. Benchmarking may be internal between entities within a single organization, or - subject to confidentiality restrictions - external between competing entities.
- Price benchmarking - comparing prices paid by different organisations for the same or similar resources.
- Collaborative benchmarking
- Competitive benchmarking

== Tools ==
Benchmarking software can be used to organize large and complex amounts of information. Software packages can extend the concept of benchmarking and competitive analysis by allowing individuals to handle such large and complex amounts or strategies. Such tools support different types of benchmarking (see above) and can reduce the above costs significantly.

The emerging technology of benchmarking engines automates the process of turning data into noteworthy comparative insights, sometimes even expressing those insights in English sentences.

== Metric benchmarking ==
Another approach to making comparisons involves using more aggregative cost or production information to identify strong and weak performing units. The two most common forms of quantitative analysis used in metric benchmarking are data envelopment analysis (DEA) and regression analysis. DEA estimates the cost level an efficient firm should be able to achieve in a particular market. In infrastructure regulation, DEA can be used to reward companies/operators whose costs are near the efficient frontier with additional profits. Regression analysis estimates what the average firm should be able to achieve. With regression analysis, firms that performed better than average can be rewarded while firms that performed worse than average can be penalized. Such benchmarking studies are used to create yardstick comparisons, allowing outsiders to evaluate the performance of operators in an industry. Advanced statistical techniques, including stochastic frontier analysis, have been used to identify high and weak performers in industries, including applications to schools, hospitals, water utilities, and electric utilities.

One of the biggest challenges in metric benchmarking is the variety of metric definitions used among companies or divisions. Definitions may change over time within the same organization due to changes in leadership and priorities. The most useful comparisons can be made when metric definitions are consistent across the units being compared and remain unchanged over time, allowing improvements to be measured accurately.

== See also ==
- Global Benchmarking Network
- Project management triangle
- Profit impact of marketing strategy
