= Natasha (disambiguation) =

Natasha is a name of Russian origin. It is derived from the Latin name Natalia, which means "born on Christmas Day".

Natasha may also refer to:

- Natasha (1974 film), an Argentine film
- Natasha (2001 film) (Nataša), a Serbian film
- Natasha (2015 film), a Canadian film
- Natasha (2020 film), a Russian-language film
- Natasha (crater), a crater on the Moon
- Natasha (monkey), a macaque at the Safari Park zoo near Tel Aviv, Israel
- Natasha (EP), an extended play by Pig Destroyer, or the title song
- "Natasha" (Rufus Wainwright song), a song from the 2003 album Want One by Rufus Wainwright
- Natasha (Sesame Street), a character on Sesame Street
- The proper name of the star HD 85390
- Natasha doll, a style of squishy doll

== See also ==
- Natacha (disambiguation)
