= La tarea según Natacha =

Spanish children's story

La tarea según Natacha is an illustrated children's story that was first published by Alfaguara Infantil in collaboration with UNICEF in November, 2000. It is written by Luis Pescetti and illustrated by O'Kif. The original publication features a foreword by Spanish essayist Fernando Savater.

== In Bituín Bituín Natacha ==
The story of La tarea según Natacha is also included as a stand-alone chapter in the chapter book Bituín bituín Natacha.

=== Synopsis ===
Natacha and Pati have a project to complete for school. They are supposed to write a report about children's right to education. To complete their report, Natacha and Pati interview people who participate in the school system.

Books in the same series are:

- Natacha (novel)
- La tarea según Natacha
- ¡Buenísimo, Natacha!
- Chat, Natacha, chat
- Bituín bituín Natacha
- Querido diario (Natacha)
- La enciclopedia de las Chicas Perla
- Te amo, lectura (Natacha)
- Nuestro planeta, Natacha
