= Mister G (children's performer) =

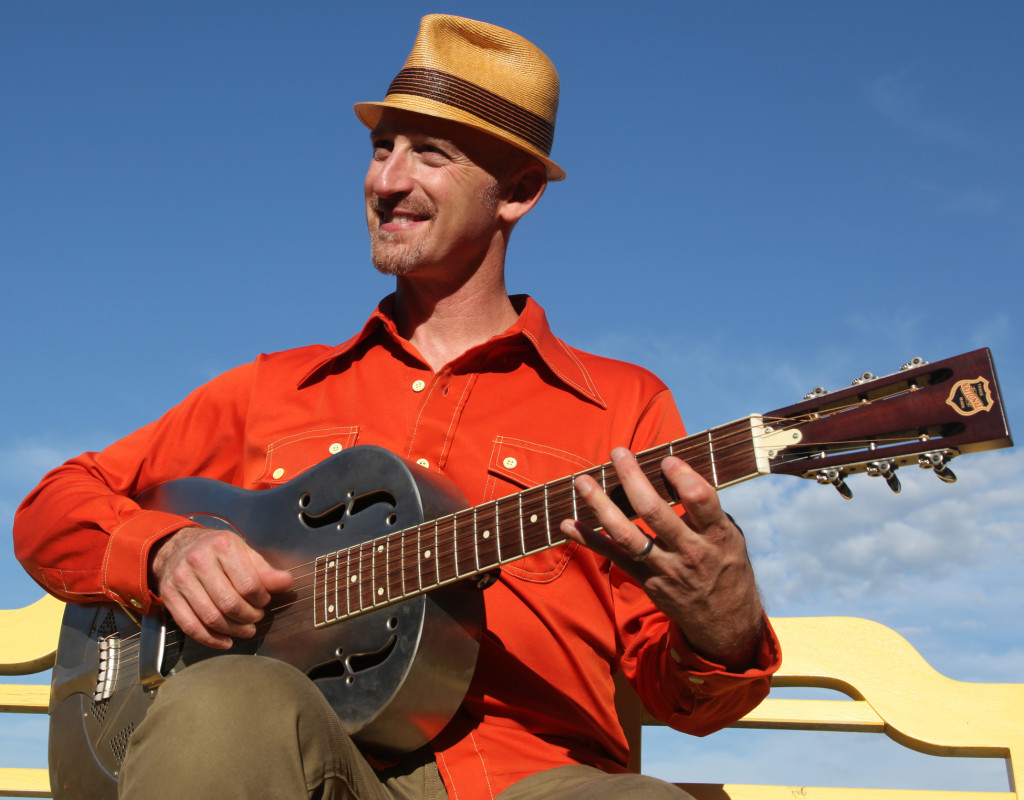
- Mister G

Background information
- Born: Ben Gundersheimer; Philadelphia, Pennsylvania; United States
- Genres: Children's music, funk, rock, ska, bossa nova, folk, blues, bluegrass, salsa
- Occupations: Singer, songwriter, producer, multi-instrumentalist
- Instruments: Vocals, guitar, mandolin, banjo
- Years active: 2009–present
- Labels: Coil
- Website: MisterGsongs.com

Mister G (Ben Gundersheimer) is a Latin Grammy-winning musician, author, and educator. He has released ten award-winning albums of original music for children and families, including four bilingual (Spanish/English). His 2015 bilingual release, Los Animales, won the Latin Grammy award for Best Children's album. Five of his albums (Chocolalala, Los Animales, The Mitzvah Bus, Mundo Verde/Green World, Fireflies) have won the Parents' Choice Gold Award. ABC Fiesta (2014) received a Latin Grammy nomination. His CDs have been selected as best children's albums of the year by People Magazine, Parents Magazine, and The Washington Post.

== History ==
Born and raised in Philadelphia, Pennsylvania, Mister G is the son of children's book author and illustrator Karen Gundersheimer. He graduated from Amherst College, and received a songwriting scholarship from the Berklee College of Music. As an adult-oriented singer-songwriter, he performed and toured internationally. He was awarded a full fellowship for his Master of Education degree at Smith College. For his Master's thesis at Smith College, he created a curriculum that incorporated song-writing as a learning tool. His 4th grade students dubbed him ‘Mister G’, and while teaching at the Smith College campus school, he began writing children's songs.

== Musician ==
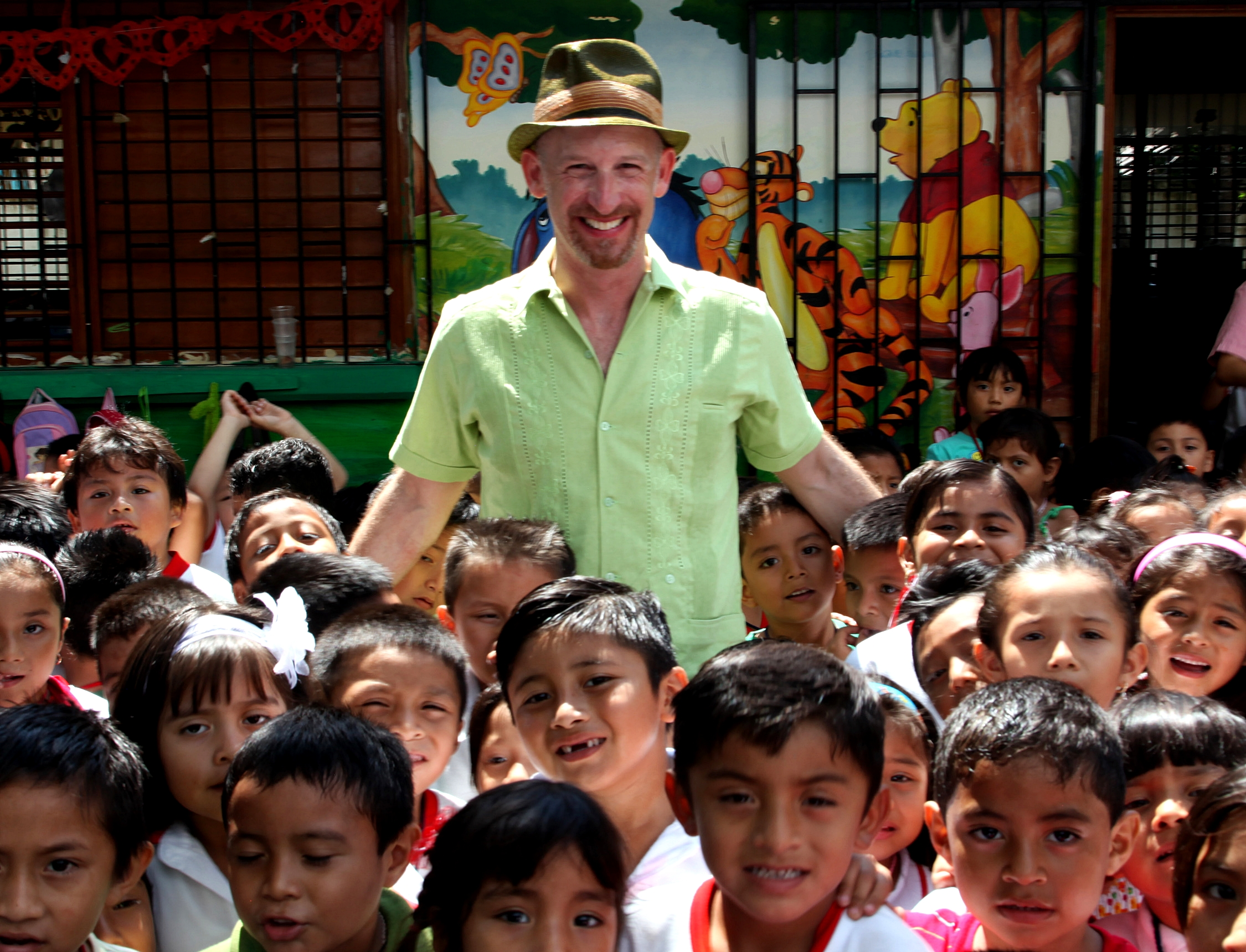
Mister G performing in Mexico

Mister G's 2010 debut children's music release, Pizza for Breakfast, was inspired by his former elementary school students at the Smith College campus school.

BUGS, released in 2011, received awards from the Parents' Choice Foundation and the National Parenting Publications. The album was also chosen as one of the top ten best children's albums of 2011 by Parents Magazine and People Magazine.

Mister G's bilingual albums, Chocolalala (2012) and "ABC Fiesta" (2013) were inspired by his concert tours throughout Latin America, and feature the voices of bilingual families.

Released in 2014, The Bossy E is Mister G's literacy-themed album, which features a variety of genres, and received a NAPPA Award. Grammy winning saxophonist Charles Neville (Neville Brothers) and Senegalese talking drum master Massamba Diop (Baaba Maal) both perform on the album.

For his Latin Grammy winning album, Los Animales (2015), Mister G collaborated with leading figures from the Latin music world including Arturo O'Farrill, Oscar Stagnaro, Marlow Rosado, Vince Cherico, and Robby Ameen.

Drawing from an eclectic range of musical influences, The Mitzvah Bus (2015), Mister G's Jewish-themed album, spans genres from funk to folk and rock to ska, while the lyrics celebrate family, holidays, food, camp and language.

Mundo Verde/Green World (2017) is a collection of original, bilingual children's songs with an environmental theme.

Seeds of Shalom (2018) is a collection of original, multicultural songs.

Mister G returns to his roots with Americana release, Fireflies (2019).

All of Mister G's albums are written, produced, recorded and mixed by Gundersheimer. Mister G has toured widely, headlining venues such as Symphony Space in New York, The National Zoo, The Hard Rock Cafe in Philadelphia, The Getty Museum in Los Angeles, The Coolidge Corner Theatre in Boston, among many others. Mister G also regularly conducts artists residencies for students and professional development workshops for teachers in schools in the United States and Latin America.

== Discography ==
=== Album ===
- Children of the World (Coil Records) 2020
- Ritmo y Rima (Coil Records) 2020
- Fireflies (Coil Records) 2019
- Seeds of Shalom (Coil Records) 2018
- Mundo Verde/Green World (Coil Records) 2017
- The Mitzvah Bus (Coil Records) 2015
- Los Animales (Coil Records) 2015
- The Bossy E (Coil Records) 2014
- ABC Fiesta (Coil Records) 2013
- Chocolalala (Coil Records) 2012
- BUGS (Coil Records) 2011
- Pizza for Breakfast (Coil Records) https://tenor.com/search/luffy-face-gifs

=== Videography ===
Dinosaur (with José Valentino)	Key West Sessions	Watch
Everything's Free (with Massamba Diop)	Black Bear Sessions	Watch
Fireflies	Released 10/2018	Watch
Siete Elefantes	Released 6/2015	Watch
The Bossy E	Released 6/2014	Watch
Cocodrilo	Released 11/2013	Watch
ABC Fiesta	Released 09/2013	Watch
Chocolalala	Released 05/2013	Watch
Gonna Take My Hat	Released 07/2011	Watch
Vamos A La Playa	Released 07/2011	Watch
Mister Chubby Pants	Released 09/2010	Watch
Squirrels	Released 09/2010	Watch

== Author ==
Mister G has written four picture books based on his original songs. All the books Señorita Mariposa, Lilah Tov/Good Night, "How Many Squirrels Are in the World?" and "We'll Make Things Better Together," were published by Penguin Random House.

== Activist ==
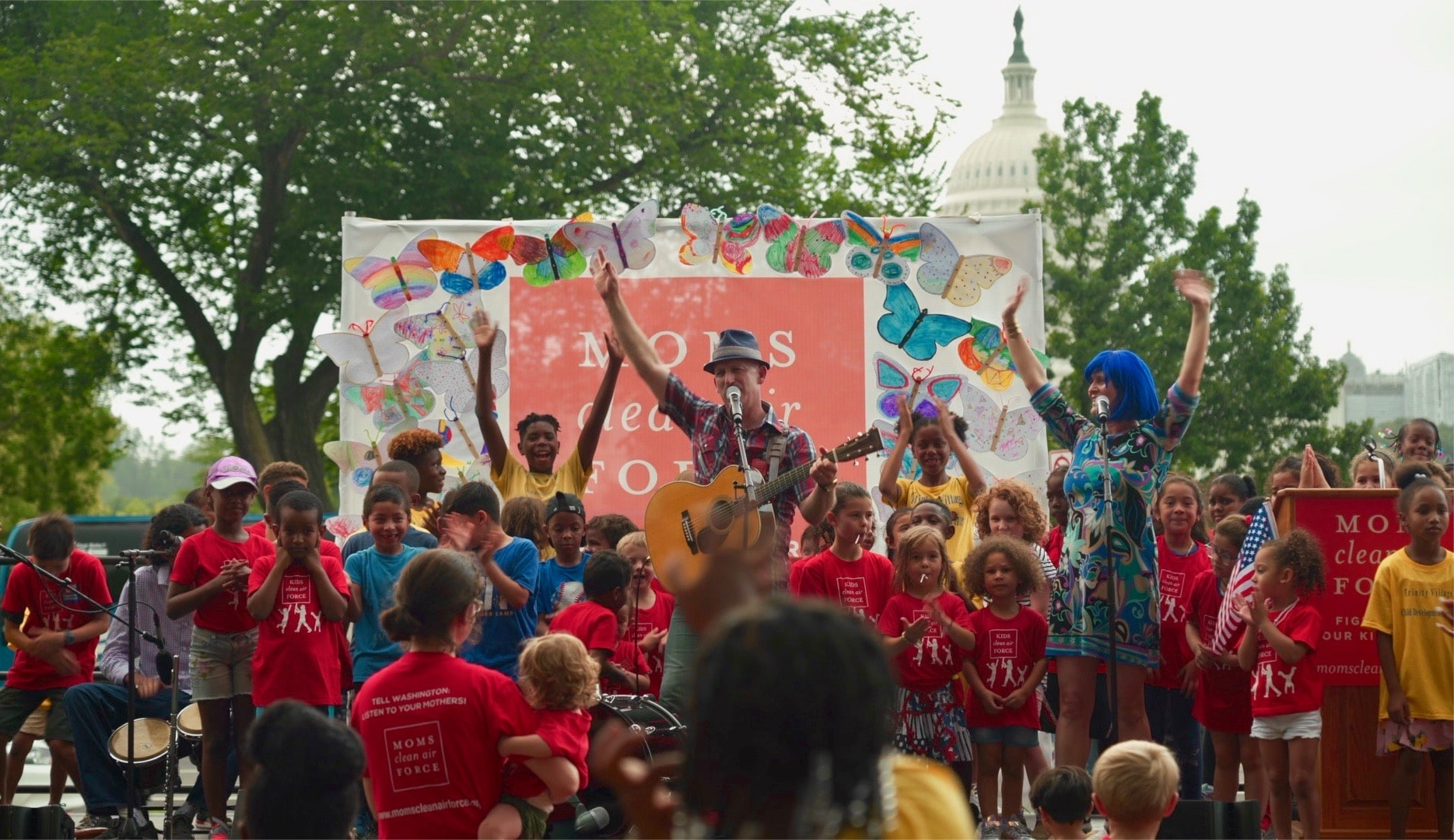

Mister G performed at the National Climate Rally in Washington, D.C. He has headlined four concerts on Capitol Hill for children and families from all fifty states in his role as an advocate for Moms Clean Air Force. Two of his albums (Mundo Verde/Green World and Seeds of Shalom) have explicit environmental themes, as does his picture book (Señorita Mariposa) which is about the monarch butterfly migration.

== Educator ==
Mister G has conducted artist residencies at schools around the US and in many other countries (Mexico, India, England, Dominican Republic, Guatemala). He also leads professional development programs for educators and presents musical keynotes at conferences.
