= Baseline Rock =

Rock in Holme Bay, Mac. Robertson Land, Antarctica

- Location within Antarctica

Geography
- Location: Antarctica
- Coordinates: 67°36′S 62°44′E

Administration
- Administered under the Antarctic Treaty System

Demographics
- Population: Uninhabited

Baseline Rock is an isolated rock lying between Nøst Island and the Flat Islands in Holme Bay, Mac. Robertson Land. It was mapped by Norwegian cartographers from air photos taken by the Lars Christensen Expedition, 1936–37, and so named by the Antarctic Names Committee of Australia because the rock was used as one end of the baseline of a triangulation carried out by Australian National Antarctic Research Expeditions in 1959.
