= Xuxa só para Baixinhos Vol. 11 – Sustentabilidade =

Studio album by Xuxa
- Released: September 18, 2011
- Genre: Children's music
- Length: 62:32
- Label: Sony Music
- Producers: Luiz Cláudio Moreira; Mônica Muniz

Xuxa chronology
Só para Baixinhos Vol. 10 (2010)	Xuxa só para Baixinhos Vol. 11 – Sustentabilidade (2011)	Só para Baixinhos Vol. 12 (2012)

Singles from Xuxa só Para Baixinhos 11
- 1. "Além das Estrelas" Released: 2011; 2. "Um Novo Lugar" Released: 2011

Xuxa só para Baixinhos 11 or Sustentabilidade (also known as XSPB 11) (transl. Only For Children Eleven - Sustainability) is the thirty-fourth studio album by Brazilian recording artist Xuxa Meneghel. It was released by Sony Music on September 18, 2011. The album is the eleventh in the collection Só Para Baixinhos.

== Release and reception ==
Xuxa só para Baixinhos Vol. 11 - Sustentabilidade was released on September 18, 2011. The DVD received double platinum certifications with more than 100,000 copies sold and was one of the best selling of 2011, ranking ninth on a list of best selling DVDs of the year. The singles were "Um Novo Lugar" and "Além das Estrelas". It was released on DVD, CD, and Blu-ray format. The boxes for the DVDs are in Digipak format (which is considered a deluxe edition), with the insertion of the disc in recyclable material. The DVDs and CDs were accompanied by two 3D Anamorphic glasses. The DVD versions come with two 3D Anamorphic glasses (blue and red lenses). In order to publicize the launch, Xuxa held a press conference in a park and planted trees. This was the third album in the "Só Para Baixinhos" collection, released by the label Sony Music. This was the first 3D DVD produced in Brazil. Xuxa só para Baixinhos contains two music videos in 3D/Blu-ray format. A total of $1 million was invested in the CD's production, the most in Sony's history for the recording of a DVD.

== Track listing ==
Xuxa só para Baixinhos 11 – CD edition
No.	Title	Writer(s)	Length
1.	"Além das Estrelas"	Vanessa Alves; Leonardo Sperling	3:03
2.	"Pot-Pourri Brasil: Brasileirinho / O Trem Maluco / Aquarela do Brasil / Janelinha / Cidade Maravilhosa / Sapo Cururu"	D. P.; Version: Vanessa Alves; Ary Sperling	3:46
3.	"Oh, Susanna Não Chores" (Oh, Susanna!) (with Nelson Freitas)	Stephen Collins Foster - Version: Vanessa Alves and Leonardo Sperling	3:14
4.	"Sabonete, Sabão" (with Higino da Cunha and Yuri da Cunha)	Yuri da Cunha	3:49
5.	"Quem Dorme é o Leão" (The Lion Sleeps Tonight)	George Weiss; Hugo Peretti; Luigi Creatore; Linda Solomon; Version: Vanessa Alves	3:23
6.	"Dona Barata" (La Cucaracha)	Traditional - Version: Vanessa Alves and Leonardo Sperling	2:05
7.	"Hava Nagila Israel" (Hava Nagila)	Traditional - Version: Vanessa Alves and Leonardo Sperling	2:19
8.	"Lá em Cima Está o Tiro Liro Liro" (Tiro Liro) (sung by Restart)	Traditional - Version: Vanessa Alves	2:53
9.	"Vamos lá Funiculì, Funiculá" (Funiculì, Funiculá) (featuring Família Lima)	Luigi Denza; Version: Vanessa Alves	3:13
10.	"Cacho de Bananas" (Day-o) (featuring Samantha Schmutz)	Irving Burgie; William Attaway; Version: Vanessa Alves	3:06
11.	"Frei João" (Frère Jacques) (featuring Leandro Hassum)	Traditional - Version: Vanessa Alves and Rafael Sperling	2:06
12.	"A Primavera" (Harugakita)	Teiichi Okano - Version: Vanessa Alves and Leonardo Sperling	3:11
13.	"Um Novo Lugar" (featuring Klara Castanho)	Vanessa Alves; Maurício Gaetani	4:01
14.	"Da Cor do Amor"	César Lemos; Karla Aponte	3:05
Total length:			43:37

Xuxa só para Baixinhos 11 – DVD and Blu Ray Edition
No.	Title	Writer(s)	Length
1.	"Introdução"		37
2.	"Além das Estrelas"	Vanessa Alves; Leonardo Sperling	3:08
3.	"Passage (Etêzinha Rosa)"		2:50
4.	"Quem Dorme é o Leão" (The Lion Sleeps Tonight)	George Weiss; Hugo Peretti; Luigi Creatore; Linda Solomon; Version: Vanessa Alves	3:28
5.	"Passage (We go to Portugal)"		0:40
6.	"Lá em Cima Está o Tiro Liro Liro" (Tiro Liro) (sung by Restart)	Tradicional - Version: Vanessa Alves	2:58
7.	"Passage (We go to Mexico)"		0:48
8.	"Dona Barata" (La Cucaracha)	Traditional - Version: Vanessa Alves and Leonardo Sperling	2:10
9.	"Passage (We go to the United States)"		0:50
10.	"Oh, Susanna Não Chores" (Oh, Susanna!) (featuring Nelson Freitas)	Stephen Collins Foster; Version: Vanessa Alves and Leonardo Sperling	3:18
11.	"Passage (We go to Angola)"		0:30
12.	"Sabonete, Sabão" (featuring Higino da Cunha and Yuri da Cunha)	Yuri da Cunha	3:54
13.	"Passage (Let's go to Italy)"		0:45
14.	"Vamos lá Funiculì, Funiculá" (Funiculì, Funiculá) (featuring Família Lima)	Luigi Denza; Version: Vanessa Alves	3:18
15.	"Passagem (Let's go to Jamaica)"		0:47
16.	"Cacho de Bananas" (Day-o) (featuring Samantha Schmutz)	Irving Burgie; William Attaway; Version: Vanessa Alves	3:11
17.	"Passage (Let's go to Israel)"		1:17
18.	"Hava Nagila Israel" (Hava Nagila)	Traditional - Version: Vanessa Alves and Leonardo Sperling	2:54
19.	"Passage (We go to Japan)"		0:42
20.	"A Primavera" (Harugakita)	Teiichi Okano; Version: Vanessa Alves and Leonardo Sperling	3:16
21.	"Passage (We go to France)"		0:35
22.	"Frei João" (Frère Jacques) (with Leandro Hassum)	Traditional - Version: Vanessa Alves and Rafael Sperling	2:11
23.	"Pass (We go to Brazil)"		0:56
24.	"Pot-Pourri Brasil: Brasileirinho / O Trem Maluco / Aquarela do Brasil / Janelinha / Cidade Maravilhosa / Sapo Cururu"	D. P.; Version: Vanessa Alves and Ary Sperling	3:51
25.	"Password: (Word)"		1:52
26.	"Um Novo Lugar" (featuring Klara Castanho)	Vanessa Alves; Maurício Gaetani	4:06
27.	"Pass (The return of the Etêzinha Rosa)"		2:26
28.	"Da Cor do Amor"	César Lemos; Karla Aponte	3:10
29.	"Credits" (Além das Estrelas (Instrumental))		2:09
Total length:			62:32

== Personnel ==
- General and Artistic Direction: Xuxa Meneghel
- Direction: Paulo de Barros
- Production: Luiz Cláudio Moreira and Mônica Muniz
- Production Director: Junior Porto
- Musical production: Ary Sperling
- Musical Coordination: Vanessa Alves
- Cinematography by: André Horta
- Concept Design: Juan Díaz and Miguel Lessa
- Hair and makeup: Luciene Araújo, Gabriela Besser and Sérgia Maria Lima de Almeida
- Set design: Lueli Antunes
- Art Production: Flávia Cristofaro, Guga Feijó
- Graphic design: Duda Souza and Rodrigo Lima
- CG: Rodrigo Oliveira and Sérgio Yamasaki
- Choreographies: Wagner Menezes (Fly)
- Custom: Marcelo Cavalcanti
- Make up: Vavá Torres
- Edition: Tainá Diniz
- Finishing: Bernardo Varela
- Mixing and Mastering: Lillian Stock Bonzi
- Authorization and Programming: Alexandre Pereira and Fábio Pontual
- Menus and Extras: Fausto Villanova and Gabriel Araújo
- 3D Animation and Screen Creation: Daniel Lins and Alessandro Pires
- Composition and Effects: Agson Alessandre and Eliaze Mateus
- Version of Songs and Subtitles: Guilherme Reis (CD) / Val Andrade (Vídeo) / Luís Cláudio Barbosa (DVD)
- Spelling and Editing: Helo Lopes

== Certifications ==
Region	Certification	Certified units/sales
Brazil (Pro-Música Brasil) DVD	2× Platinum	100,000^{*}
^{*} Sales figures based on certification alone.
