= Global Benchmarking Network =

- Company type: Non-Profit Organization
- Founded: 1994; 32 years ago
- Founder: UK BM Centre (UK), SPI (USA), SIQ (Sweden), IZB (Germany), BM Club Italy (Italy)
- Headquarters: GBN Secretariat in Berlin, Germany
- Area served: Worldwide
- Key people: Robert C. Camp (President); Robin S. Mann (Chairman); Holger Kohl, Ronald Orth, Florian Kidschun (Secretary General)
- Website: www.globalbenchmarking.org

The Global Benchmarking Network (GBN) is an alliance of leading benchmarking centres worldwide. Current membership comprises 20 benchmarking centres in 20 countries, which represent more than 30,000 businesses and government agencies. The GBN was founded in November 1994 by representatives from benchmarking centres in Germany, Italy, Sweden, the United Kingdom and the United States.

== Structure ==
The GBN is a non-profit organization. Funding is raised from affiliates' annual fees and other sources approved at the annual meeting. It has a Chairman, a Vice Chairman, and a Secretary General.

== Services ==
The GBN was established to promote and to support these core benefits for its affiliates:

- to share experience in benchmarking centre operations
- to promote and to assist with international partnering between individual organizations participating in centre activities
- to enhance centres with marketing and promotional support for benchmarking
- to exchange selected publications between affiliates including newsletters and promotional material
- to share advance information on up-coming meetings, activities, and events including national and international awards
