= Luis Pescetti =

Argentine musician & author (born 1958)

Luis María Pescetti
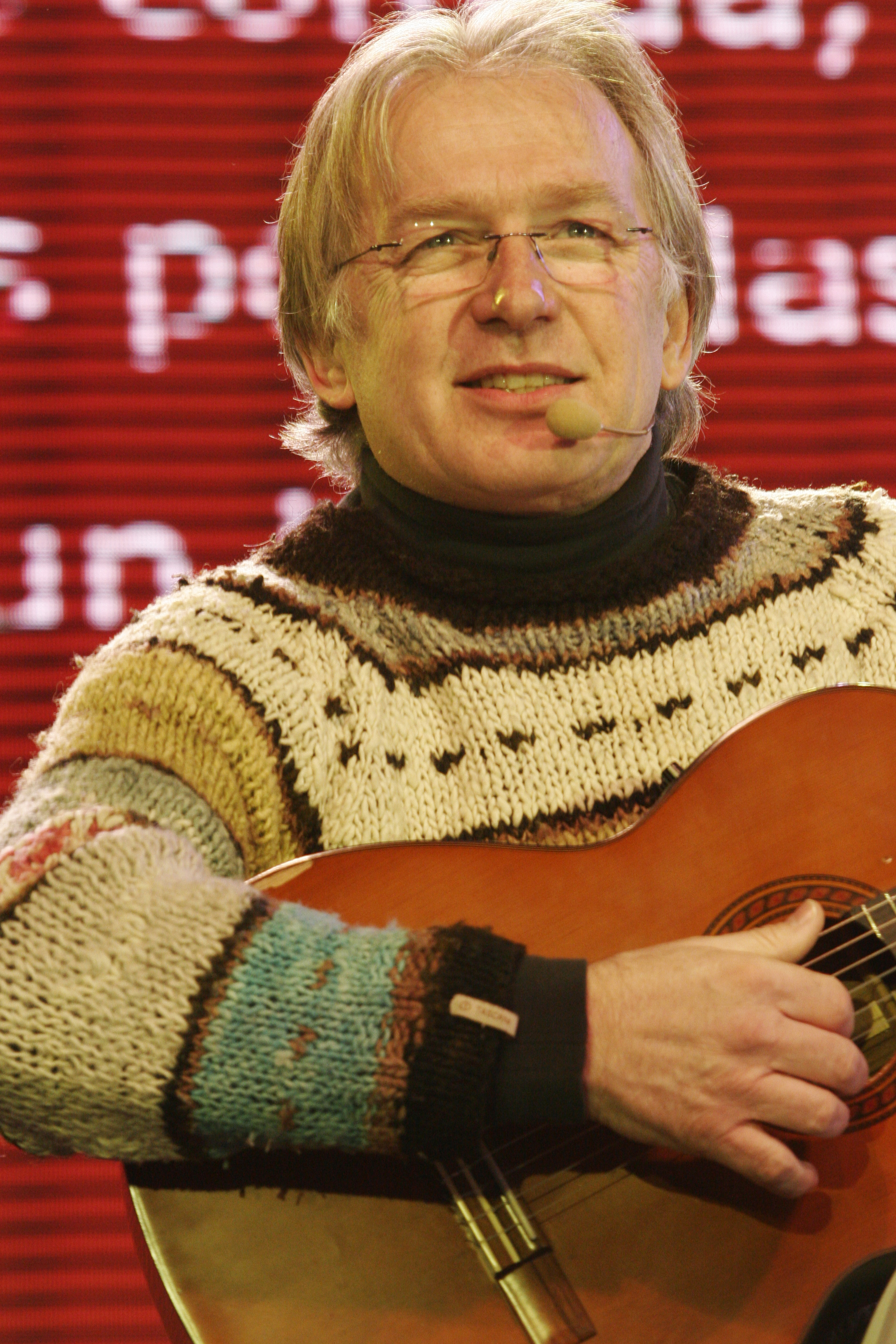
- Luis Pescetti in 2011
- Born: January 15, 1958 (age 68); San Jorge, Santa Fe, Argentina
- Occupations: Writer; musician; actor
- Website: www.luispescetti.com

Luis María Pescetti (born January 15, 1958) is an Argentinian novelist, essayist, musician and actor.

== Career ==
He received the Casa de las Américas Prize in 1997, The White Ravens award in the years 1998, 2001, and 2005 (given by the Internationale Jugendbibliothek) and three premios Gardel. In 2010 he gave a TED conference on humor, childhood and identity. That same year he was awarded with the Latin Grammy Award to Best Latin Children's Album, and the ALIJA Great Prize (IBBY Argentina) for his book Cartas al Rey de la Cabina (Letters to the King of the Cabin, still unpublished in English). In 2011 he was given the Konex Award for his work in the field of children and youth literature and music.

== Works ==
=== Children's books ===
- Marito y el temible Puf vuelven a ganar otra vez
- ¡¡¡Natacha!!!
- El pulpo está crudo
- Naranjas y marcianos
- Caperucita Roja (tal como se lo contaron a Jorge)
- Historias de los señores Moc y Poc
- Natacha
- Frin
- La tarea según Natacha
- ¡Padrísimo, Natacha!
- Mamá, ¿por qué nadie es como nosotros?
- Nadie te creería
- Chat, Natacha, chat
- Bituín bituín Natacha
- La Mona Risa
- Lejos de Frin
- Querido diario
- No quiero ir a dormir
- La enciclopedia de las Chicas Perla
- Te amo, lectura (Natacha)

=== Adult books ===
- ¡Qué fácil es estar en pareja! (18.379 consejos básicos)
- El ciudadano de mis zapatos
- Neuróticos on line
- La vida y otros síntomas
- Copyright. Plagios literarios y poder político al desnudo

==== For teachers ====
- Juegos de lectura en voz alta
- Taller de animación y juegos musicales
- Taller de animación musical y juegos
- La fábrica de chistes

=== Discography ===
- El vampiro negro (1999)
- Casette pirata (2001)
- Antología de Luis Pescetti (2003)
- Bocasucia (2004)
- Qué público de porquería (2005)
- Inútil insistir (2008)
- Cartas al Rey de la Cabina (2010)
- Tengo mal comportamiento (2011)
- Él empezó primero (2013)
- Nuevas Cartas Al Rey de la Cabina y Anita, Mi Amor (2016)
- Textos Tecleados (2017)
- Queridos (Live) (2017)
- Magia Todo El Día (2018)
- Natasha: La Música (2018)
- Lío (2021)

=== Videos ===
- No quiero ir a dormir
- Luis te ve
- Cartas al Rey de la Cabina
