= Lullabies of Latin America =

Lullabies of Latin America is a children's album released in 1999 by Maria Del Rey. It features songs and lullabies in both Spanish and English, researched by Del Rey as a part of her performance career. The fourteen tracks include works from nations like Argentina, Mexico, Puerto Rico, and Cuba. The album earned a nomination for Best Latin Children's Album at the 2000 Latin Grammy Awards.
