= Eric Herman (musician) =

American singer-songwriter (born 1969)

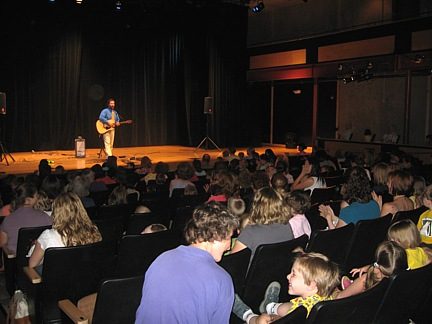
- Eric Herman performing in Broomfield, CO.

Background information
- Born: Eric Herman Endres; June 14, 1969 (age 57); Buffalo, New York, United States
- Genre: Children's music
- Instruments: Vocals, Guitar
- Years active: 2002–present
- Website: EricHermanMusic.com

Eric Herman (born Eric Herman Endres, June 14, 1969) is an American children's music performer based in Richland, Washington, United States. His music combines various styles of rock music with often wryly humorous kid-related lyrics.

== Musical career ==
Herman performed with Western New York area rock bands and was a regular performer on the Buffalo area acoustic singer/songwriter and live theater scenes. In 2003 a successful production of a musical comedy he wrote, A Week in the Life, was staged at the Alleyway Theater in Buffalo, New York, earning him an Artie Award nomination as "Best Actor in a Musical". But with the success of his first album of music for kids, The Kid in the Mirror, Herman decided to devote his full attention to producing and performing kids' music under the act name Eric Herman and the Invisible Band. His second album, Monkey Business, proved even more successful, with Seattle's Victory Music Review calling it "one of the best kids' records ever".

Eric Herman songs and videos have been heard and seen nationally on PBS Kids, The Today Show, SiriusXM and Fox & Friends. His song "Blackbeard, Bluebeard and Redbeard" was voted "Best Children's Song" by the international Just Plain Folks Music Organization for their 2006 awards, and he received a Parents' Choice Award for his What a Ride! and Incredibly Spaced-Out Adventures of Jupiter Jackson albums. Eric's music videos have become extremely popular, with over 50 million views on YouTube. In 2010 "The Elephant Song" was covered by the duo, Victor and Leo, for the studio album Xuxa só para Baixinhos Vol. 10 – Baixinhos, Bichinhos e + by Brazilian superstar, Xuxa, and his video for "The Tale of the Sun and the Moon" was featured prominently in a scene of the Warner Bros. movie Life as We Know It. Eric's songs have been regular top sellers on the popular indie music site, CDBaby, at one time holding 8 of the top 10 spots.

Herman credits his wife, Roseann, with co-writing many of his songs and co-producing his albums. Roseann died in 2013 after a long illness.

In 2011, Eric expanded his performance options to include a live band, known as Eric Herman and the Thunder Puppies. Band members as of 2015 are Chris Baugh (bass/vocals), Ben Macy (keyboard/accordion), Dave Pettey (guitar/vocals), and Javier Ruiz (drums/vocals). The band collaborated on the song "A Million Ways to Play" from Party Animal, and released a full album, Bubble Wrap, in 2016. Herman often includes his daughters, Becca and Evee, as part of his live shows.

Shortly after the 2016 release of Bubble Wrap, The Thunder Puppies officially disbanded due to scheduling conflicts. Eric continues to tour with Dave Pettey (Guitar/Bass/Percussion) and Ben Macy (Piano/Keyboard/Accordion) as a three-piece band.

== Discography ==
- The Kid in the Mirror (2003)
- Monkey Business (2005)
- Snow Day! (2006)
- Snail's Pace (2007)
- What a Ride! (2009)
- The Elephant DVD (2011)
- Party Animal (2014)
- The Incredibly Spaced-Out Adventures of Jupiter Jackson (comedy sketch album) (2014)
- Bubble Wrap (with the Thunder Puppies) (2016)
- The Eric Herman Strikes Back - DVD (2017)
- Magic Beans (2022)
