= Baseline Road =

Baseline Road may refer to:

United States

- Baseline Road (Arizona) in Phoenix
- Baseline Road (Colorado) in Boulder
- Baseline Road (Southern California)
- M-102 (Michigan highway) in Southeast Michigan

Canada

- Baseline Road (Ottawa) in Ontario
- Baseline Road (Sherwood Park) in Alberta

== See also ==
- Baseline (surveying): "Baseline Road" in the United States
