= El ciudadano de mis zapatos =

El ciudadano de mis zapatos is a novel written by Luis Pescetti, Argentine writer and musician. It was published in 1997 by Publisher Sudamericana in Buenos Aires, Argentina. It is one of the 2 Pescetti books that was adapted into a stage play.

== Plot ==
The protagonist, Santiago, narrates the story from his home in Mexico, and retells the story of life, with frequent moves through Argentina. His struggle to discover himself and his identity is constantly in conflict with the struggles of the country, and his father's ill health.

== Characters ==
=== Santiago ===
Santiago is an Argentinian Music Teacher and comedian, who is in love Andrea, a kindergarten teacher. He has always wanted to travel, but is tied down by his job and his father, who has cancer.

=== Andrea ===
The love interest of the protagonist. They never end up together, due to Andrea's grandmother's terminal illness.

=== Amelia ===
A teacher friend of Santiago, who runs off with a Cuban journalist.

== Awards ==
Casa de las Américas Prize in Cuba, in 1997.
