= Benchmarking (journal) =

- Discipline: Quality management
- Language: English
- Edited by: Angappa Gunasekaran

Publication details
- Former name(s): Benchmarking for Quality Management & Technology
- History: 1994–present
- Publisher: Emerald Group Publishing
- Frequency: Bimonthly
- Impact factor: 5.6 (2022)

Standard abbreviations
- ISO 4: Benchmarking

Indexing
- ISSN: 1758-4094 (print); 1463-5771 (web)
- LCCN: 00253663
- OCLC no.: 45498507

Links
- Journal homepage; Online access

Benchmarking is a bimonthly peer-reviewed academic journal that covers the field of quality management. The editor-in-chief is Angappa Gunasekaran (Penn State Harrisburg). The journal was established in 1994 as Benchmarking for Quality Management & Technology and obtained its current name in 1999. It is published by Emerald Group Publishing. The journal is abstracted and indexed in Inspec, ProQuest databases, Emerging Sources Citation Index, and Scopus. According to the Journal Citation Reports, the journal has a 2022 impact factor of 5.6.
