= List of awards and nominations received by Xuxa =

Xuxa awards and nominations
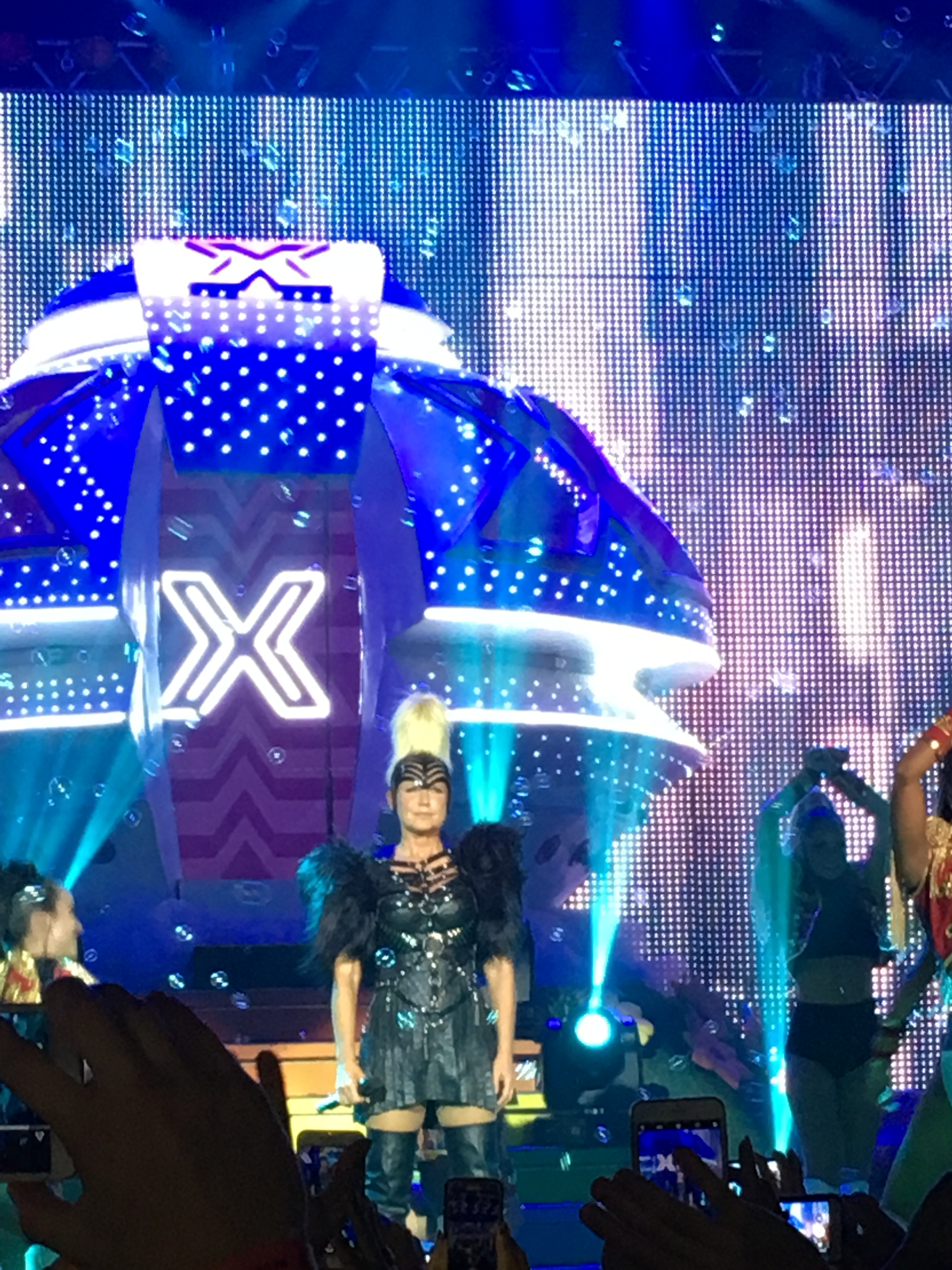
- Xuxa in 2017.
Awards and nominations
Award	Wins	Nominations
Latin Grammy Awards	2	6
Troféu Imprensa	12	23

Totals (Note: Certain award groups do not simply award one winner. They acknowledge several different recipients, have runners-up, and have third place. Since this is a specific recognition and is different from losing an award, runner-up mentions are considered wins in this award tally. For simplification and to avoid errors, each award in this list has been presumed to have had a prior nomination.)
- Wins: 25
- Nominations: 16

This is a list of awards and nominations received by Xuxa a Brazilian singer, TV host and actress. She began her career in 1985 in PolyGram with álbum Xuxa e Seus Amigos, and has been the most popular Latin acts in the world since the mid-1980s. Xuxa has sold 50 million records worldwide. Becoming one of Latin singers who sold more albums in the 20th century, winning several awards including 2 Latin Grammy Awards.

In 1990, Xuxa won the Queen's Award Viña del Mar Festival. In 1992 won two categories of the 5th Brazilian Music Awards, including best children's album. In 2000, Xuxa won the award Gaviota de Plata, at the Viña del Mar International Song Festival.

In 2000 she released a series of DVDs named Xuxa Só Para Baixinhos (Xuxa Only for Little Ones), with Xuxa singing children's songs and dancing in a choreography that small children could easily duplicate. It was the first of a successful series that won the Latin Grammy Award for Best Children's Album in 2002 and 2003 in addition to being nominated for the same award in 2004, 2006, 2012 and 2013.

As an actress, Xuxa was honored at the 37th Annual Gramado Film Festival with a "Kikito" by its more than 16 children's films throughout his career. On television, Xuxa won several awards, including a nomination Daytime Emmy Awards for TV series Xuxa in 1994. With Xou da Xuxa won six times in a row the Troféu Imprensa for best children's show, in 1995, 1998, 1999 won award for Xuxa Park, and in 2007 for TV Xuxa. In 2010 she was honored in Miami with the Brazilian International Press Award for his contribution to children's programming. In the same year received an honorary award at the 14th Prêmio Extra de Televisão, presented annually by the newspaper Extra. In 2013 was awarded at the 52nd Troféu Imprensa as best host or entertainer TV.

For his philanthropic work, Xuxa honored in 2008 by Albert II, Prince of Monaco, for services rendered to society through its Fundação Xuxa Meneghel. In September 2011, she and Shakira came together through their charitable foundations to help to children under six years of the poorest communities in Brazil. The two artists and Brazilian government officials signed an agreement of cooperation in the city of Rio de Janeiro, that in their first four years intend "improve education' for children of 100 educational centers in Brazil. In 2015, the Foundation was honored in Miami during the BrazilFoundation Gala.

== Audrey Hepburn Humanitarian Award ==
The Audrey Hepburn Humanitarian Award recognizes individuals and organizations who have made extraordinary contributions on behalf of children through advocacy, volunteer work, philanthropic efforts, educational and innovative community-based programs.

Year	Nominee / work	Award	Result
1995	Xuxa	Humanitarian Award	Won

== Brazilian Press Awards ==
Created in 1997 by journalist and producer Carlos Borges, the Brazilian International PRESS AWARDS became the largest Brazilian event outside Brazil.

Year	Nominee / work	Award	Result
2010	Xuxa	Personality	Won

== Cinema Brazil Grand Prize ==
The Grande Prêmio do Cinema Brasileiro is a Brazilian film award. It was established in 2000 as Grande Prêmio Cinema Brasil by the Ministry of Culture of Brazil that presented it in 2000 and 2001. In 2002, the newly established Academia Brasileira de Cinema taken on the role of delivering the award which was renamed to Grande Prêmio do Cinema Brasileiro.

Year	Nominee / work	Award	Result
2010	"Xuxa em O Mistério de Feiurinha"	Best Children's Feature Film	Nominated

== Daytime Emmy Awards ==
The Daytime Emmy Award is an American accolade bestowed by the New York–based National Academy of Television Arts and Sciences and the Los Angeles–based Academy of Television Arts & Sciences in recognition of excellence in American daytime television programming.

Year	Nominee / work	Award	Result
1994	"Xuxa"	Outstanding Achievement in Art Direction/Set Decoration/Scenic Design	Nominated

== Festival de Gramado ==
The Gramado Film Festival (Portuguese: Festival de Gramado) is an international film festival held annually in the Brazilian city of Gramado, Rio Grande do Sul, since 1973. Since 1992 it also gives awards to Latin American films produced outside Brazil. It is the biggest film festival in the country.

Year	Nominee / work	Award	Result
2009	Xuxa	Kikito	Won

== Latin Grammy Awards ==
The Latin Grammy Award is an award by The Latin Academy of Recording Arts & Sciences to recognize outstanding achievement in the Latin music industry. Xuxa has received two awards from six nominations.

Year	Nominee / work	Award	Result
2002	"Só para Baixinhos Vol.2"	Best Latin Children's Album	Won
2003	"Só para Baixinhos Vol.3 - Country"	Best Latin Children's Album	Won
2004	"Só para Baixinhos Vol.4 - Praia"	Best Latin Children's Album	Nominated
2006	"Só para Baixinhos Vol.6 - Festa"	Best Latin Children's Album	Nominated
2012	"Só para Baixinhos Vol. 11 - Sustentabilidade"	Best Latin Children's Album	Nominated
2013	"Só para Baixinhos Vol. 12 - É Pra Dançar"	Best Latin Children's Album	Nominated

== Martín Fierro Awards ==
The Martín Fierro Awards (Spanish: Premios Martín Fierro) is the name of the most prominent awards for Argentine radio and television, granted by APTRA, the Association of Argentine Television and Radio Journalists.

Year	Nominee / work	Award	Result
1992	"El Show de Xuxa"	Best Children's Program	Won

== Order Associative of Monaco ==
Order Associative of Monaco is presented during the Gala Night of Associations in Monaco. The award is the highest distinction awarded to personalities who excel in the philanthropic area.

Year	Nominee / work	Award	Result
2008	"Fundação Xuxa Meneghel"	Order Associative of Monaco	Won

== Premio Lo Nuestro ==
The Lo Nuestro Awards or Premios Lo Nuestro (Spanish for "Our Thing") is a Spanish-language awards show honoring the best of Latin music.

Year	Nominee / work	Award	Result
1990	Xuxa	Pop New Artist of the Year	Nominated

== Prêmio Extra de Televisão ==
The Prêmio Extra de Televisão (English: Extra Awards Television) has been conducted since 1998 by the newspaper Extra, rewarding the best of Brazilian television.

Year	Nominee / work	Award	Result
2010	Xuxa	Personality	Won

== Prêmio da Música Brasileira ==
The Prêmio da Música Brasileira (English: Brazilian Music Awards) is an award that honors since 1987 the best of Brazilian popular music.

Year	Nominee / work	Award	Result
1992	"Xou da Xuxa Sete"	Best children's album	Won
1992	"A Voz dos Animais"	Best children's song	Won

== Prêmio QUEM ==
The Prêmio QUEM is given by Quem Magazine published in Brazil by Editora Globo.

Year	Nominee / work	Award	Result
2011	Xuxa	Personality	Won

== Troféu Imprensa ==
The Troféu Imprensa/Troféu Internet, are presented annually by SBT, to honor the best Brazilian television productions, including telenovelas.

Year	Nominee / work	Award	Result
1987	"Xou da Xuxa"	Best children's program	Won
1988	"Xou da Xuxa"	Best children's program	Won
1989	"Xou da Xuxa"	Best children's program	Won
1990	"Xou da Xuxa"	Best children's program	Won
1991	"Xou da Xuxa"	Best children's program	Won
1992	"Xou da Xuxa"	Best children's program	Won
1993	"Xou da Xuxa"	Best children's program	Won
1995	"Xuxa Park"	Best children's program	Won
1996	"Xuxa Park"	Best children's program	Nominated
1997	"Xuxa Park"	Best children's program	Nominated
1998	"Xuxa Park"	Best children's program	Won
1999	"Xuxa Park"	Best children's program	Won
2000	"Xuxa Park"	Best children's program	Nominated
2001	"Xuxa Park"	Best children's program	Nominated
2003	"Xuxa no Mundo da Imaginação"	Best children's program	Nominated
2004	"Xuxa no Mundo da Imaginação"	Best children's program	Nominated
2005	"Xuxa no Mundo da Imaginação"	Best children's program	Nominated
2007	"TV Xuxa"	Best children's program	Won
2008	"TV Xuxa"	Best children's program	Nominated
2009	"TV Xuxa"	Best children's program	Nominated
2010	"TV Xuxa"	Best children's program	Nominated
2013	Xuxa	Best host or entertainer TV	Won
2016	"Xuxa Meneghel"	Best TV host	Nominated

== Viña del Mar International Song Festival ==
The Viña del Mar International Song Festival (Spanish: Festival Internacional de la Canción de Viña del Mar) is a music festival that is considered the best and biggest in Latin America and the most important musical event in the Americas.

Year	Nominee / work	Award	Result
1990	Xuxa	Festival Queen	Won
2000	Xuxa	Gaivota de Prata	Won
