= Xuxa 2000 =

Studio album by Xuxa
- Released: 1999
- Recorded: 1999
- Genre: Pop; pagode; axé; children's; country
- Length: 61:04
- Label: Som Livre
- Producer: Michael Sullivan; Zé Henrique

Xuxa chronology
Só Faltava Você (1998)	Xuxa 2000 (1999)	Xuxa só para Baixinhos 1 (2000)

Singles from Xuxa 2000
- 1. "Vira, Vira (Planeta Vira, Vira)" Released: 1999; 2. "Pagoxu" Released: 1999; 3. "O Bicho Vai Pegar" Released: 1999; 4. "Profecias (Fim do Mundo)" Released: 1999

Xuxa 2000 is the twenty-second studio album by Brazilian recording artist Xuxa Meneghel. It was released by Som Livre in 1999, being the last Xuxa studio album, before the series Só Para Baixinhos.

== Background and production ==
In February 1999, it was announced that Xuxa would record a live album during their April tour of the same year. Because of the recordings of the film Requebra, neither the album nor the tour came to fruition. In contrast, the Children's Queen, felt the need to make a more childish album. With the cancellation of the live project, they decided to start producing another studio album. At the request of the present host, hundreds of composers sent their songs to the production of Planeta Xuxa until about 20 songs were selected.

Just like in Só Faltava Você, Xuxa wanted to make a record more aimed at the children's audience, more specifically, an album for her daughter, as she stated in some interviews of the time. The recording of the album began in late June 1999.

The album was produced by Michael Sullivan and Zé Henrique, had artistic direction of Aramis Barros and artistic coordination Marlene Mattos and Xuxa Meneghel. It was recorded in the Som Livre studios.

At the time, much was said about Nostradamus' prophecy about the world ending in 2000 and the coming of the new millennium. Taking a hitch on the subject, were ordered music with these themes and so were recorded: "Profecias (Fim do Mundo)", 2000 and "Aquarius" (discarded).

In addition to tracks with the biggest subject of the time, Xuxa realized in part his desire to record more infantile songs, which are the majority in this album. The songs aimed at the underdogs on this album were nothing more than a test for the project Só Para Baixinhos, that the blonde would release the following year.

Initially First Anniversary would not be a potpourri, it would only count to the first song and a chorus shouting "Sasha! Sasha! Sasha!". This version even touched on the "Primeiro Aniversário" of Xuxa's daughter.

For the adolescents, "Vira, Vira" (Planeta Vira, Vira) that served as theme of the Planeta Xuxa program that year, "Efeito Dominó" e "Só o Nosso Amor" that served as a trail for the film Requebra, besides the theme song of the film, which was discarded and released in the voice of the composer himself, the singer Vinny. One of the bands that stand out is "O Bicho Vai Pegar", the last partnership of the presenter with the composer Cid Guerreiro, the same of "Ilariê".

During the song selection phase, the Molejo group composed a song especially for Xuxa. The singer liked "Pagoxu" so much that she decided to record for the album. Initially, there would be no talk in the introduction of the pagode, but rather you speak of Xuxa herself after the chorus of the song. While recording an edition of Planeta Xuxa on August 15, 1999, Xuxa and Anderson (vocalist of the group) commented on the song after the blonde showed an excerpt of the result of the song. In this conversation, the idea of the vocalist appeared to record some lines to insert in the introduction, as if it were announcing the arrival of Xuxa.

In 1999, Xuxa made his return to the cinema with the film Requebra. Two songs were composed for the feature and soon after included in the album: the pop "Efeito Dominó" and the romantic ballad "Só o Nosso Amor".

The art of Xuxa 2000 is one of the most masterful of Xuxa's entire career. The cover, back cover and the label bring the concept of the end of the world. The photos of the rehearsal for the Spanish album El Mundo és de los Dos, which was released that same year, were reused. The inside of the booklet simulated a notebook with many drawings, pencils and photos of the essay done for the album. One of the highlights of the art was a holographic seal with the signature and the Xuxa kissing marque that was glued to the packaging.

== Release ==
Xuxa 2000 was released in the second half of 1999, the album only had two runs, totaling 100,000 copies sold. The cover and the back cover have a holographic effect, the first print also came with a holographic tag with a kiss marquinha and the signature of Xuxa, he is in the list of those that have not been re-released, among this list are Tô de Bem com a Vida (1996), Boas Notícias (1997) and Só Faltava Você (1998).

== Promotion ==
Since March 1999, the song "Vira, Vira (Planeta Vira, Vira)" was already performed in the Planeta Xuxa program. However, the release of the album only really began in August when Xuxa started to present other songs from the album on the show, as well as performing at Xuxa Park. All the songs were performed on TV, except "Rap da Xuxa".

In October 1999, the program Xuxa Park begins its new season and begins to have as theme of opening the music "Profecias (Fim do Mundo)". Already in the first program, Xuxa started a contest where a group of boys and girls should learn the choreography of Dancing the Country, the group that had the best performance would win a bicycle for each member. The promotion was released in a few editions of the Park and soon canceled. In the same month, the Queen of Children performed "Profecias" in the show of the campaign Criança Esperança (Child Hope). Only two songs from Xuxa 2000 have won clips in their release phase. From December 1999, the music video "Profecias (Fim do Mundo)", began to serve as the opening theme of the novel Vila Madalena. In the same month, the music 2000 had its video shown in the Show of Turned on the 31 of December.

Taking a ride on Xuxa's return to the movies, the songs "Efeito Dominó" and Only Our Love were included in the soundtrack of the film Requebra. The blonde even gave interviews to some radios promoting the album and her most recent feature. In November 1999, the blonde arrived to participate in the program Show of Antônio Carlos of Radio Globo.

The 2000 tour was scheduled for October 1999, including the custom bus that would transport Xuxa and his team was ready, but for unknown reasons the project was canceled. Xuxa only presented songs from this album in a show for children of INCA (Instituto Nacional do Câncer), in Rio de Janeiro on August 21, 1999, and in a closed presentation for Rede Globo employees, held at the Globo studios (Rio de Janeiro) on 31 of October of that year. Curiously, the scene of this show was basically the same as the Xuxa 92 tour, but Xuxa was coming down from the white ship used in the last season of Xou da Xuxa. To date, no video record has been found of these shows, just photos.

As part of the disclosure, Xuxa would appear in the program Domingão do Faustão on December 12, 1999, but due to a subacute thyroiditis was forced to cancel. Participation in Santa's Arrival in Maracanã, Rio de Janeiro was also canceled and Xuxa was replaced by Eliana.

== Track listing ==
Xuxa 2000 – CD edition
No.	Title	Writer(s)	Length
1.	"Profecias (Fim do Mundo)"	Michael Sullivan; Dudu Falcão	4:13
2.	"Pagoxu" (featuring Molejo)	Anderson Leonardo; Claumirzinho; Márcio Paiva	3:33
3.	"O Bicho Vai Pegar"	Cid Guerreiro; Zé Afonso	3:17
4.	"O Elefante Feliz"	Michael Sullivan; Carlos Colla	3:38
5.	"A Festinha"	Luizito; Paulo Azarias	4:15
6.	"Lambaeróbica da Xuxa"	Álvaro Socci; Cláudio Matta	4:10
7.	"Dançando o Country"	Marco Camargo; Zé Henrique	4:17
8.	"Dia Das Bruxas"	Michael Sullivan; Dudu Falcão	3:54
9.	"A Bandinha da Xuxa"	Zé Henrique; Jorge Gomes	4:01
10.	"Cabeça, Ombro e Membros"	Vanessa Alves; Zé Henrique Costa	3:30
11.	"Efeito Dominó"	Michal Sullivan; Dudu Falcão	4:26
12.	"Vira, Vira (Planeta Vira, Vira)"	Sandro Mora Mau; Formiga	2:50
13.	"Rap da Xuxa"	Renata Arruda	3:37
14.	"Só o Nosso Amor"	Michael Sullivan; Dudu Falcão	4:20
15.	"Primeiro Aniversário / Parabéns Pra Você / Parabéns da Xuxa"	Michael Sullivan; Dudu Falcão	3:53
16.	"2000"	Alvaro Socci; Claudio Matta	3:36
Total length:			61:04

== Personnel ==
- Production: Michael Sullivan and Zé Henrique
- Art Direction: Aramis Barros
- Art Coordination: Marlene Mattos and Xuxa Meneghel
- Recording Technician: João Carlos (Joca), Sérgio Rocha, Mário Jorge and Mauro Moraes
- Mixing Assistants: Ivan Carvalho, Williams Oliveira, Everaldo Andrade
- Vocal Preparation: Angela de Castro
- Mixing Technicians: Jorge 'Gordo' Guimarães
- Studio Assistants (Som Livre): Claudio Oliveira, Ciro Albuquerque, Everaldo and Williams Oliveira
- Production assistant: Duda Nogueira
- Studio Coordination: Hélio de Freitas

== Certifications ==
Certifications for "Xuxa 2000"
Region	Certification	Certified units/sales
Brazil (Pro-Música Brasil)	Gold	100,000^{‡}
^{‡} Sales+streaming figures based on certification alone.
