= Só Faltava Você =

Studio album by Xuxa
- Released: September 1998
- Recorded: 1998
- Genre: Pop; dance-pop; children's; axé
- Length: 64:13
- Label: Som Livre
- Producer: Michael Sullivan; Zé Henrique

Xuxa chronology
Boas Notícias (1997)	Só Faltava Você (1998)	Xuxa 2000 (1999)

Singles from Só Faltava Você
- 1. "Uma Canção Para Sasha" Released: 1998; 2. "Eu tô Feliz" Released: 1998; 3. "Pelotão da Xuxa" Released: 1998; 4. "Adoleta" Released: 1998

Só Faltava Você (English: Only You are Missing) is the twenty-first studio album by Brazilian recording artist Xuxa Meneghel. It was released by Som Livre in September 1998.

Released two months after Sasha's birth, the album was totally geared towards that moment of joy that the Children's Queen lived at the time. Although the whole album was thought of in the daughter, Xuxa dedicated more specifically two for its small one: "Só Faltava Você" and "Uma Canção Para Sasha", of which it participated in the composition.

Só Faltava Você was not as elaborate as the others, due to the pregnancy and the birth of the singer's daughter, which caused the album to "flop" in some stores of the country until 2003. The tracks most remembered by the public are: "Eu tô Feliz" and "Pelotão da Xuxa". It was certified gold by the Pro-Música Brasil (PMB).

== Background and production ==
In 1998, Xuxa Meneghel would realize the dream of being a mother. The singer was preparing for the birth of her daughter and the event in her life, which influenced her career a lot. In addition to changes in Xuxa Park and Planeta Xuxa, the blonde was planning to star in a special Mother's Day night, something that did not happen.

In the song, Xuxa had plans to release an album of lullabies, which even got to put voice in some songs, and another more infantile one where it would only sing two tracks and the rest of the disc would be interpreted by invited artists. Projects that were also canceled.

From the end of the projects she was planning to release that year, Xuxa and her team began to develop an album around her pregnancy. Several songs were presented to Xuxa talking about what it is to be a mother. The song "Mãe", "Palavrinha Mágica" that came to be performed in Xuxa Park and Planeta Xuxa at that time. Another song recorded for the album, but which was not presented to the public was the re-recording of "Leãozinho" by Brazilian singer Caetano Veloso. Xuxa had already re-recorded the song in a duet with Caetano on his first album Xuxa e Seus Amigos (1985) and decided to record that year, as he had long said that he would have a daughter with a lion sign and would like to sing that song for her.

"Férias no Hawaii (Hulla Hulla)" which was originally recorded for the summer season of Planeta Xuxa, which did not materialize, was discarded and included on the album.

In July, it was decided the song that would name the project: Só Faltava Você The composition portrays that despite all the happiness of the work, Xuxa was incomplete until being mother.

The photographic essay for the album was performed shortly before Sasha's birth. Xuxa bet on many artificial hair, but in fewer costumes. The photos of the rehearsal were well taken advantage of in the art of the album that had on its back cover and insert, three photos of Xuxa, each with a different artificial hair. The photos were well publicized at the time.

After the birth of his daughter, Xuxa and composers Michael Sullivan and Dudu Falcão wrote the song "Uma Canção Para Sasha". The singer contributed to the composition by telling the composers everything she felt at that moment. The song was recorded in a studio set up at Xuxa's house, which at that time had already withdrawn from some activities to enjoy his daughter. It was mixed at the beginning of the song, Sasha's first crying during childbirth and a speech of Xuxa quite excited during the recording of the song. "Uma Canção Para Sasha" was included on the album in a hurry, since the album was already finalized until that moment.

It was produced by Michael Sullivan and Zé Henrique, had artistic direction of Aramis Barros and had artistic coordination of Marlene Mattos and Xuxa. It was recorded in the Som Livre studios.

Initially, the album would have 20 songs, but the tracklist was reduced to 16. The songs were discarded: "Mãe", "Palavrinha Mágica", which came to be presented in the programs of the singer, "Um Mundo Melhor", performed in the program social Criança Esperança (Child Hope) 1998, "O Park Já Chegou (Chega Mais)", performed a few times in Xuxa Park and "Vamos Sacudir", sometimes performed on Planet Xuxa.

== Release ==
The album was released in September 1998. while Xuxa presented the special Xuxa 12 Years. The sales were not very good for the time, and the album ran aground in stores, the album is on the list of those that have not been reissued, along with Tô de Bem com a Vida (1996), Boas Notícias (1997) and Xuxa 2000 (1999).

== Promotion ==
As for the other records, Só Faltava Você had little publicity. The songs were little worked on the programs of Xuxa, except for "Eu tô Feliz" and "Adoleta". The only ones not performed on TV were "Rima 2 (a Malhação Continua)" and "Uma Canção Para Sasha". As in the previous album, Boas Notícias, the disc's release was incorporated into the program scenarios. At Xuxa Park, from the return of maternity leave, the stage floor was changed to a cover art of the album. In Planeta Xuxa, also after the return of Xuxa, the photo of the cover of the disc happened to serve of floor in the scene. The photos of the bottom panels of the ball in which the blonde made her entrance were also changed to images of the essay for Só Faltava Você, plus a circle with a photo of the rehearsal for the disc that came down from the ceiling after Xuxa left the ball.

After the release of the album, the single "Uma Canção Para Sasha" was distributed to the radios all over Brazil. Although it was released as a single, the song has never been performed on the singer's shows or shows.

A tour was planned for the first half of 1999, when Xuxa would also record a live album. Due to the recording of the film Requebra, the project was canceled. The only presentations where the Só Faltava Você songs were part of the setlist were: Santa Claus Arrival on December 20, 1998, in Porto Alegre, the Rio de Janeiro concert for the Christmas Without Hunger campaign also in December 1998, in addition to the presentation for children of INCA (National Cancer Institute) in August 1999 and a closed show for employees of Rede Globo on October 31, 1999.

In its dissemination phase, a commercial simpleton was conveyed in Rede Globo's programming. The 10-second commercial brought images of various programs from Xuxa on Globo to the song "Eu tô Feliz" and "Uma Canção Para Sasha", which may have contributed to the low sales, since the ad implied that it was a collection.

== Track listing ==
Só Faltava Você – CD edition
No.	Title	Writer(s)	Length
1.	"Eu tô Feliz"	Cid Guerreiro; Pretinha	3:34
2.	"Park da Alegria"	Zé Henrique; Fred Pereira	3:59
3.	"Dança do Sapatinho"	Renata Arruda; Mariana Richard "Metralha"	3:45
4.	"Pelotão da Xuxa"	Vanessa Alves; Vanessa Amaral; Andrezza Cruz; Barbara Borges; Gisele Gomes; Caren Lima; Diane Santos; Graziela Schmitt	3:35
5.	"Rima 2 (a Malhação Continua)"	Zé Henrique; Fred Pereira	3:57
6.	"Adoleta"	Álvaro Socci; Cláudio Matta	3:25
7.	"O Que é, o Que é?"	Zé Henrique; Rogério Enoé	3:55
8.	"Hora do Banho (Chuá Chuá)"	Michael Sullivan; Dudu Falcão	3:54
9.	"Os Avós"	Michael Sullivan; Dudu Falcão	3:24
10.	"Férias no Hawaii (Hulla Hulla)"	Michael Sullivan; Dudu Falcão	4:15
11.	"O Açúcar e o Sal"	Marcos Cardoso; J. Ribamar; Flávia Carneiro	4:32
12.	"Máquina do Tempo"	Marcos Valle; Claudio Rabello; M. Pierre	4:11
13.	"Valsa da Bailarina"	Michael Sullivan; Dudu Falcão	4:42
14.	"Estrela Cadente"	Eduardo Nanã	5:00
15.	"Só Faltava Você"	Álvaro Socci; Cláudio Matta; Vivian Perl	3:22
16.	"Uma Canção Para Sasha"	Xuxa Meneghel; Michael Sullivan; Dudu Falcão	4:45
Total length:			64:13

== Personnel ==
- Produced: Michael Sullivan and Zé Henrique
- Art Direction: Aramis Barros
- Artistic Coordination: Marlene Mattos and Xuxa Meneghel
- Recording Technician: João Carlos (Joca), Sérgio Rocha, Mário Jorge and Mauro Moraes
- Recording Assistants: Claudio Oliveira, Ciro Albuquerque, Everaldo, Ivan Carvalho and Williams Oliveira
- Studio Coordination: Hélio de Freitas
- Recorded in the studios: Som Livre
- Makeup: Free Sound / Sérgio Seabra
- Mixing Technicians: Jorge 'Gordo' Guimarães
- Production Assistant: Duda Nogueira
- Mixing Assistants: Ivan Carvalho, Williams Oliveira and Everaldo

== Certifications ==
Region	Certification	Certified units/sales
Brazil (Pro-Música Brasil)	Gold	100,000^{*}
^{*} Sales figures based on certification alone.
