= Leticia Spiller =

Brazilian actress

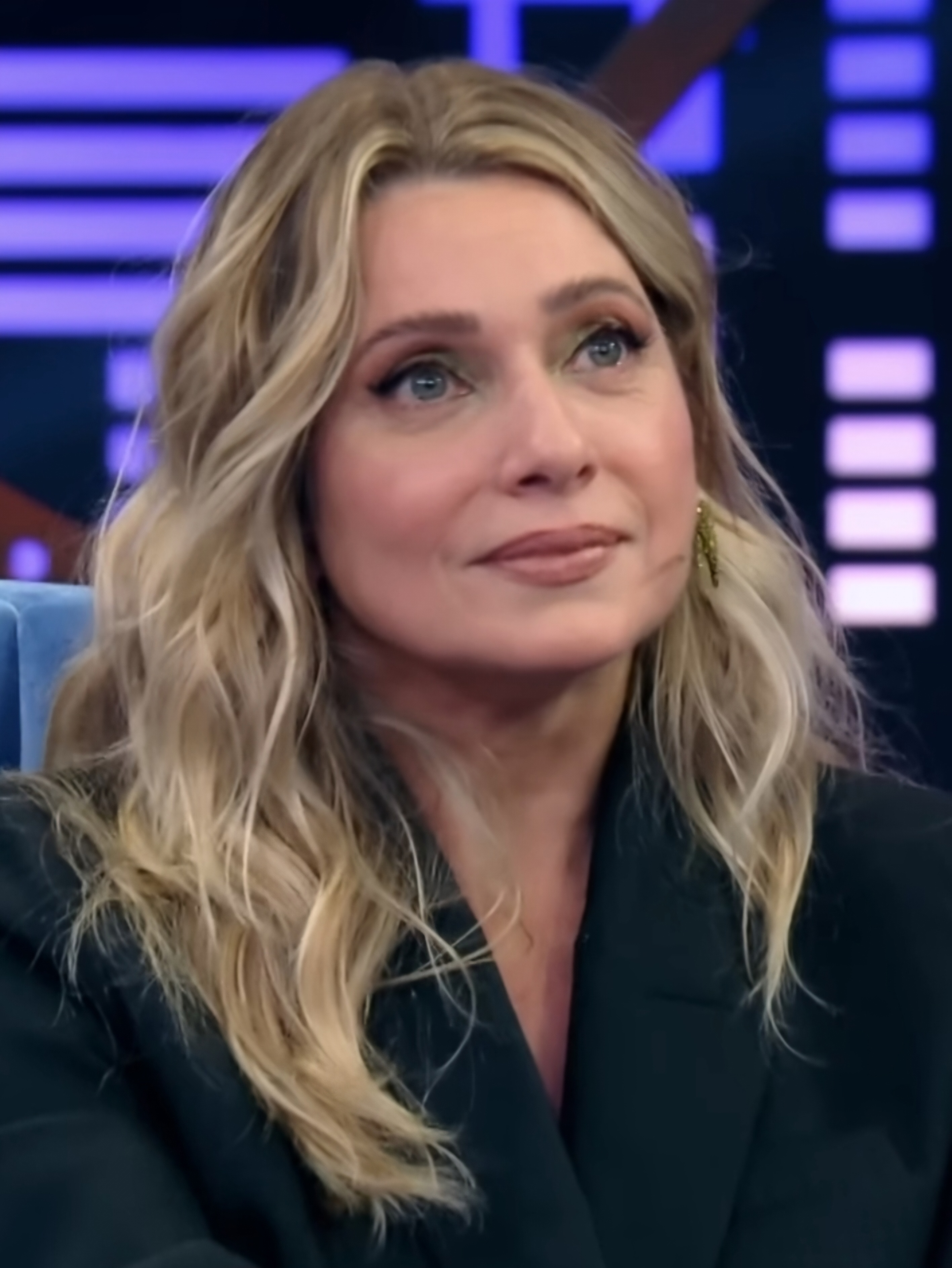
- Spiller in 2024
- Born: Leticia Spiller Pena; 19 June 1973 (age 53); Rio de Janeiro, Brazil
- Years active: 1989–present
- Partner(s): Marcello Novaes (1995–2000); Lucas Loureiro (2007–2016)
- Children: 2

Leticia Spiller Pena (born 19 June 1973) is a Brazilian actress, filmmaker, writer, and singer.

== Personal life ==
Spiller was married to actor Marcello Novaes, with whom she has a son named Pedro, born in 1996.

On January 20, 2011 Spiller gave birth to a girl, Stella, her daughter by her boyfriend, Lucas Loureiro. She was with Loureiro from June 2009 until 2016.

== Filmography ==
Television
Year	Title	Role	Notes
1989	Xou da Xuxa	Pituxa Pastel - (Paquita)	1989-1992
1991	El Show de Xuxa	Pituxa Pastel - (Paquita)	
1992	Xuxa Park	Pituxa Pastel - (Paquita)	
1992	Despedida de Solteiro	Debbie	Cameo
1992	Os Trapalhões		Cameo
1994	Os Trapalhões		Cameo
1994	Quatro por Quatro	Babalu (Barbarela Lurdes)	
1996	O Rei do Gado	Giovanna Berdinazzi	First phase
1997	Zazá	Beatriz Soffer	
1998	Mulher	Women with postpartum depression	Cameo
1999	Suave Veneno	Maria Regina Cerqueira Figueira	
1999	Zorra Total	Herself	Cameo
2000	Esplendor	Flávia Cristina	
2001	A Grande Família	Sofia	Cameo
2001	Casseta & Planeta, Urgente!	Maria Regina	Cameo
2002	Sabor da Paixão	Diana	
2003	Xuxa no Mundo da Imaginação	Vambrina	
2003	Sítio do Picapau Amarelo	Gavita	Cameo
2003	Kubanacan	Laura / Adelaide Labarca	Cameo
2004	A Diarista	Herself	Ep: "Aquele do Projac"
2004	Senhora do Destino	Vivianne Fontes / Viviane Perón	
2005	Cidade dos Homens	Herself	Ep: "Em Algum Lugar do Futuro"
2005	Quem vai ficar com Mário?	Diana	Special year-end
2006	Xuxa 20 Anos		Special
2007	Amazônia, de Galvez a Chico Mendes	Anália	
2007	Linha Direta Justiça	Sylvia Thibau	Ep: "Caso Nelson Rodrigues"
2007	Duas Caras	Maria Eva Monteiro Duarte	
2008	Casos e Acasos	Cléo	Episode: "Quem é Amanda?"
2008	Nada Fofa	Nádia Wolf	Special year-end
2009	Viver a Vida	Betina Trindade de Araújo Rocha	
2010	Afinal, o Que Querem as Mulheres?	Sophia	
2011	Malhação	Laura Guimarães	Season 19
2012	Salve Jorge	Antônia Alcântara Flores Galvão	
2013	Joia Rara	Lola Gardel	
2014	Boogie Oogie	Gilda	
2015	I Love Paraisópolis	Soraya Bremmer	
2016	Sol Nascente	Helena de Freitas (Lenita Tatoo)	
2017	Os Dias Eram Assim	Monique Sampaio Pereira	
2026	Coração Acelerado	Janete Garcia	

=== Film ===
- 1990 - Lua de Cristal.... Paquita Pituxa Pastel
- 1990 - Sonho de Verão.... Paquita Pituxa Pastel
- 1991 - Gaúcho Negro.... Adriana
- 1997 - O Pulso (short film)
- 2000 - Oriundi.... Caterina Padovani / Sofia D'Angelo
- 2000 - Villa-Lobos, uma vida de paixão.... Mindinha
- 2002 - A Paixão de Jacobina.... Jacobina Mentz
- 2002 - Xuxa e os Duendes 2 - No Caminho das Fadas
- 2004 - O Problema (short film)
- 2007 - Xuxa em Sonho de Menina.... Mother of Kikinha
- 2009 - Flordelis - Basta uma Palavra para Mudar.... Volúcia
- 2010 - Tudo o que Deus criou.... Maura
- 2011 - O Gerente
- 2011 - Desenrola.... Virgínia
- 2012 - Joãozinho de Carne e Osso (short film)
- 2012 - O Inventor de Sonhos

== Theater ==
- Isadora Duncan
- A leve, o próximo nome da Terra
- O falcão e o imperador
- Abelardo e Heloísa
- Peer Gynt
