= Xuxa Park fire =

2001 fire in Brazil

A still frame from video of the fire less than 10 seconds after it started

Mere seconds later, the set is engulfed in flames, and smoke darkens the soundstage

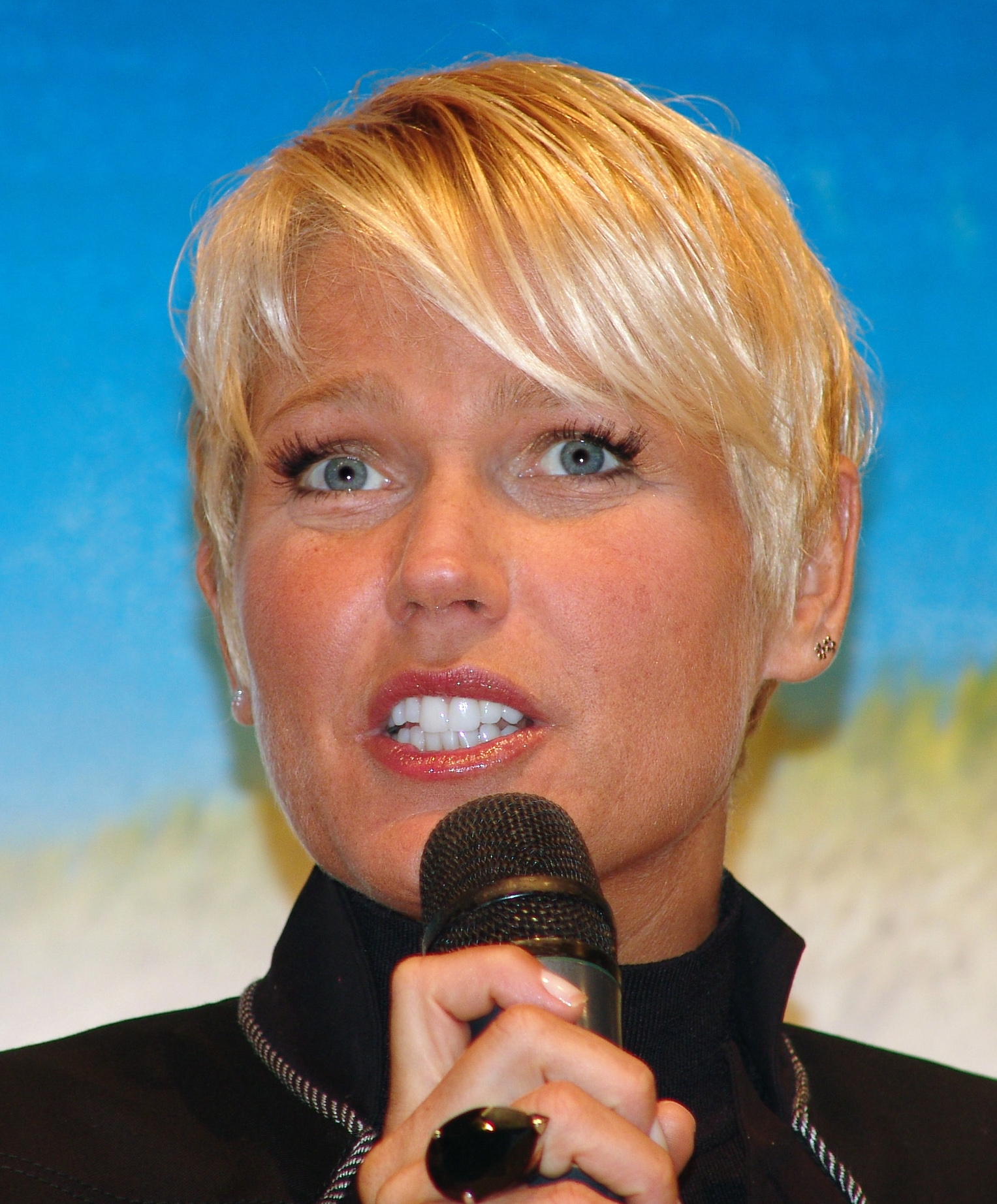
Xuxa in 2006

The Xuxa Park fire was a flash fire that erupted on a Brazilian TV soundstage in Rio de Janeiro during a 2001 taping of the children's television show Xuxa Park. There were no deaths, but 26 people were injured, seven of them critically. The incident was captured on videotape.

== The fire ==
On 11 January 2001, a taping of Xuxa Park was in progress on a soundstage of the Brazilian network Rede Globo with a live audience of about 320 people (most of whom were adolescent children) in attendance. As Xuxa and her dancers were performing a show-closing musical number, a small fire started in the set's mechanical "spaceship" (through which Xuxa would normally have exited the stage in another 2 minutes). For a few seconds, they continued their musical number, unaware of what was happening behind them. An alert stagehand quickly appeared with a small fire extinguisher and attempted to extinguish the flames, but suddenly the fire erupted violently, engulfing the "spaceship," and he was forced to retreat as others on stage also began to flee. The fire grew and spread quickly and intensively as children, dancers, stagehands, and audience members fled towards the exits to escape the heat, smoke, and melting plastic. Within less than a minute, the entire set was engulfed in flames. Children were removed from the ferris wheel, which was a part of the scenery. The only one who failed to get out was a child named Thamires. Leonilson, Xuxa's bodyguard, came back to remove them from the set.

Though camera operators and other technicians fled with the others, the cameras continued to operate and feed the videotape machines as the conflagration grew before the cameras were pulled out of the burning soundstage by staff. The footage was shown frequently on Brazilian news shows for days after the fire.

== Aftermath ==
Many were treated for minor smoke inhalation, and four individuals were seriously injured by smoke inhalation and burns. These included Leonilson (nicknamed "Léo"), Xuxa's personal bodyguard; the show's resident clown Topetão; and two of the children. The two men helped save many of the children (including one who had become stuck in one of the on-set rides). All eventually recovered from their injuries after a long health treatment, funded by the network.

Xuxa, who was not injured, nevertheless was strongly affected by the fire, and reportedly spent quite some time afterwards suffering from post-traumatic stress disorder. She visited the fire victims and their families in the hospital frequently. Xuxa Park went on hiatus after the fire, and was ultimately cancelled. The time slot previously occupied by Xuxa Park in the saturday morning was replaced with cartoons and TV series. Eight episodes had been taped and never aired, out of respect for the victims, according to the network. Xuxa returned to the studios where the show was taped three months after the fire, in April, to record the penultimate season of the TV show Planeta Xuxa.
