= Rod Hanna =

Brazilian band

Rod Hanna is a Brazilian band specializing in disco music with 7 CDs and 3 DVDs of reinterpretations and original songs. Formed 22 years ago by the duo Rodrigo Laguna and Nora Hanna, the band has made partnerships with major Brazilian and American musicians: A Taste of Honey and Boys Town Gang, Kiko Zambianchi, As Frenéticas, Luiz Schiavon, Kiko Loureiro, Thomas Roth, DJ Memê and Tuta Aquino. This year a partnership with Ex Commodores David Cochrane is scheduled.

== History ==
=== The Beginning ===
Born in Ribeirão Preto - SP - Brazil, the couple Rodrigo Laguna and Nora Hanna already worked together since they were teenagers in 1986, but only in 1994 they released their first CD album: "Rod Hanna", named after the duo. Produced by fellow singer-songwriter, Kiko Zambianchi, the album had new songs by Rodrigo and Kiko and also dancing reinterpretations of "You've Got a Friend" (Carole King). All tracks received guitar arrangements and were performed by Kiko Loureiro, who is currently guitarist for Megadeth. A partnership composition with Luiz Schiavon (RPM) resulted in the recording of the song "Rei Não". The album opened the way in the Brazilian television, on shows such as Xuxa Hits on TV Globo.

=== Second album ===
In 1996 Rod Hanna released his second CD, Vinil, from Velas record company, which took all the influence from disco music and the 1970s. Wearing mouth bell pants, black power hair, platform shoes, feathers and sequins, Rod Hanna stood out not only for the music but also for the period clothing, made with research and art by renowned costume designers, as Sandra Fukelman, who still works with the band.

=== Music Video and Brazilian Media Appearances ===
The music video "Vinil", directed by director Geraldo Santos, reached an important space on Brazilian MTV. In 1999, a partnership with Thomas Roth from Lua Music record company resulted in the album Disco, produced by Rodrigo Laguna with their original music and reinterpretations, with influences from the disco era. In addition to MTV and several other TV channels, the band received a very positive review in Fantástico show on Globo, in a reportage on the return of the disco club.

=== Live Shows ===
With the transition from vinyl discs to CD and before the widespread use of MP3 format with broadband internet, most people had no access to songs that had not yet been re-released on CD, especially in the Brazilian territory. Therefore, Rod Hanna concerts came to be an option to listen to songs from bands such as Earth, Wind & Fire, Donna Summer and Bee Gees. From this situation, the need to record their live shows emerged and a new CD album was released, also by Lua Music, DiscoFesta, in 2000. Soon after, the retro-futuristic album 2070 was released, in 2001.

In 2003, DiscoFesta II was released, which besides a live concert recording, brought two bonus tracks produced by the Brazilian hit maker DJ Memê: A version of "Heaven Knows" (Donna Summer), which came to be part of the song collection Songs from Amaury Jr. show, which received a gold record prize. The original song "Pra Você Voltar" (Fabinho Almeida / Ian) chosen and produced by DJ Memê, became part of MTV's programming and was performed every Sunday for five consecutive months in which the band participated in the live show O Jogo da Vida on TV Bandeirantes and also was a hit in radio stations in São Paulo.

=== Mamma Mia ===
In 2010 the band began a partnership with entrepreneur Manoel Poladian who set up the ‘’Mamma Mia’’ concert in which they shared the stage with the English group Abba Magic.

=== Broadway ===
In 2012 the band debuted the concert "Rod Hanna on Broadway: the Party of Music", celebrating the love of Brazilian people for musicals, denoted by the fact that Brazil has become the third country in the world in Broadway musicals national versions. The main motive of the concert is the musical that addressed Disco music, such as Priscilla, Mamma Mia and Saturday Night Fever, but the greatest honor was reserved to Carmen Miranda, who was a star on Broadway in the 1940s. The concert is still in its itinerant shows and have been presented in Porto Alegre, Natal, Recife, Belo Horizonte, Fortaleza, Rio de Janeiro and completed over 20 presentations at Bradesco Theatre in São Paulo. A video recording of this concert was released, available on YouTube and on the official website of the band.

=== Brazil and Around the World ===
In 2014, to celebrate the 20th anniversary of the band, Poladian Productions brought the group A Taste of Honey to share the stage with Rod Hanna on a tour in Brazil. Afterwards, David Cochrane, former Commodores and Lionel Richie's songwriting and production partner. David, believing that Rod Hanna could have an international career, invited them to record together in his studios in Los Angeles. The first track was chosen by David "Pra Você Voltar" which received the production and participation of David on vocals and incidental verses. Nora Hanna wrote a new chorus in English and the song was renamed "To Have You Again". This track was remixed by DJs Waltinho Ponce and Flávio Miranda, in an EDM House version and will be released in Brazil and in the United States, along with a music video, which has scenes recorded in the Santa Monica Pier in Los Angeles. The expected date for the release is the day June 29, the same date it the first CD Rod Hanna in 1994 was released.

== Discography ==
- 1994 - CD: Rod Hanna
- 1996 - CD: Rod Hanna – Vinil
- 1999 - CD: Rod Hanna Disco
- 2000 - CD: Discofesta – 70's Superhits
- 2002 - CD: Rod Hanna 2070
- 2003 - CD: Discofesta 2 – 70's/80's Superhits
- 2005 - DVD: Rod Hanna
- 2009 - DVD: Rod Hanna Disco Club 70's 80's Superhits
- 2009 - CD: Rod Hanna Disco Club 70's 80's Superhits
- 2012 - Rod Hanna On Broadway
