= Boas Notícias =

Studio album by Xuxa
- Released: September 22, 1997
- Recorded: 1997
- Genre: Pop; dance-pop; children's; axé
- Length: 52:38
- Label: Som Livre
- Producer: Michael Sullivan; Zé Henrique

Xuxa chronology
| Tô de Bem com a Vida (1996) | Boas Notícias (1997) | Só Faltava Você (1998) |

Singles from Boas Notícias
- 1. "Libera Geral" Released: 1997; 2. "Planeta Xuxa" Released: 1997; 3. "Xuxalelê" Released: 1997; 4. "Boas Notícias" Released: 1997; 5. "Serenata do Grilo" Released: 1997

Boas Notícias (English: Good News) is the twentieth studio album by Brazilian recording artist Xuxa Meneghel. It was released on September 22, 1997, by Som Livre.

The album follows the style of the three discs previously released, focusing on the children and youth audience, but this time betting more on dance-pop and axé. It was certified platinum by the Pro-Música Brasil (PMB).

== Background and production ==
After the celebrations of 10 years of Globo TV and the success of the album Tô de Bem com a Vida (1996), Xuxa was preparing to debut a new program on Rede Globo, Planeta Xuxa. The production of the new album begins with the ordering of themes for the new evening attraction, thus arises the songs "Planeta Xuxa" and "Libera Geral". Including, initially Libera Geral would be the track that would give title to the album. This possibility was worked until July 1997.

In addition to bringing a bit of pop, something that had been left out of the previous release, it is possible to note that little by little, Xuxa was bringing back more childish songs to his records like the case of "Preste Atenção", "Agora eu Vou Andar (Andar Devagarinho)" and "Godofredo, o Piolho".

The axé that was high at the time and began to become one of the marks of the albums of the 90s of Xuxa, also influences the album. In addition to "Xuxa Lelê" and "Libera Geral", "Diet" was included, composition of Carlinhos Brown that would be part of the carnival album that would be released in early 1997, but was canceled.

"Na Hora em Que Você Quiser Chegar", it is highlighted because it was made up of the blonde's great desire to become a mother. The presenter had been discussing for some time the desire to have a child and out of curiosity, Xuxa discovered in December 1997 that she was pregnant.

For Boas Notícias, the singer decided to take quite different pictures. On the day of the rehearsal, Xuxa carried a suitcase with dozens of wigs that were used in the photo essay. The pictures with the brown wig were published in Manchete magazine in 1997 and none of them were used in the album. Another part of the essay was published in the magazine Caras that same year.

The album was produced by Michael Sullivan, wears the artistic direction of Aramis Barros, was recorded in the studios: Som Livre and had co-production Zé Henrique, Marlene Mattos and Xuxa Meneghel.

== Release and reception ==
Boas Notícias It was released on September 22, 1997, in CD and cassette format. Boas Notícias was certified platinum by the Pro-Música Brasil (PMB), recognizing a 250,000 shipments within the country. It peaked at number 15 on the chart the 50 best-selling albums of Brazil, according to Billboard.

== Promotion ==
The release of Boas Notícias only really began in August 1997 when Xuxa began to present the album's songs in their shows. "Xuxa Lelê", "Agora eu Vou Andar (Andar Devagarinho)" and "Super Hiper" (that soon after was discarded from the album) were the first ones shown to the public in Xuxa Park. "Libera Geral" and "Planeta Xuxa" were already known by the public for being themes of the same name program and presented in the shows of the second phase of the Tour Tô de bem com a Vida.

Still in August, a single was distributed to the radios of all Brazil with the songs "Boas Notícias" and "Serenata do Grilo". Entitled Xuxa 97, the single received this name because the album still did not have a definite name.

On September 28, 1997, Xuxa held a free concert at Parque do Carmo in São Paulo to announce the launch of Boas Noticias. The presentation was attended by more than 200 thousand people. After the event, more songs from the album will be included in the set of the Tour Tô de bem com a Vida and the singles are performed at Santa's Arrival in Porto Alegre.

The following month, the Queen of Children stars in a Children's Day special that featured music videos: "Xuxa Lelê", "Amarelinha (Pulando, Pulando)", "Serenata do Grilo", "Boas Notícias" and "Oração de um Novo Milênio". Much of this special, just as his video were recorded in Fortaleza, Ceará. In addition to the videos, a show was held at Beach Park where the blonde introduced some of the songs from her most recent release. The song "Meu Xamego" also won a music videos that year, but recorded for the Christmas special, as well as the discarded "Celeiro do Mundo".

Still in the week of the children's day, Xuxa decided to make a live edition of Planet Xuxa on the eve of the holiday. The blonde sang some of the songs that were already known by the audience and distributed CDs to the audience. Also from the live edition, the release of the disc was incorporated into the scenario of the Planeta. The photos of the rehearsal for the Xuxa Dance album that adorned the scenery were replaced by pictures from the rehearsal for Boas Notícias, photos of the children's day special and the show Tô de bem e a Vida. In addition to the floor that was changed to an image with the label of the new release and a red strip written Boas Notícias.

On the Queen's official website, the songs "Planeta Xuxa", "Libera Geral" and "Amarelinha (Pulando, Pulando)" were made available in two versions: those of the album and those specially made for the TV show.

Unlike previous albums, the Boas Notícias tour only took place the following year. The show premiered on February 20 in Santos, São Paulo on Gonzaga Beach. The show brought together about 100,000 people on the scene.

In addition to the concerts, music videos and performances, the commercial album was shown several times in the programming of Rede Globo in 3 different versions: two versions of 30 seconds and one of ten seconds. In all of them, Xuxa images were displayed singing the working songs of the disc in their programs.

== Track listing ==
Side one
| No. | Title | Writer(s) | Length |
|---|---|---|---|
| 1. | "Xuxa Lelê" | Zé Henrique; Fred Pereira | 3:56 |
| 2. | "Planeta Xuxa" | Álvaro Socci; Claudio Matta | 3:17 |
| 3. | "Diet" | Carlinhos Brown; Mestre Pintado de Bongo | 3:11 |
| 4. | "Planeta Xuxa" | Álvaro Socci; Claudio Matta | 3:17 |
| 5. | "Boas Notícias" | Michael Sullivan e Dudu Falcão | 3:53 |
| 6. | "Amarelinha (Pulando, Pulando)" | Zé Henrique; Fred Pereira | 3:39 |
| 7. | "Oração de um Novo Milênio" | Solange Pereira; Edu Martins | 4:24 |
| Total length: | | | 25:41 |

Side two
| No. | Title | Writer(s) | Length |
|---|---|---|---|
| 1. | "Libera Geral" | Álvaro Socci; Claudio Matta | 3:53 |
| 2. | "Diet" | Carlinhos Brown; Mestre Pintado de Bongo | 3:11 |
| 3. | "Meu Xamego" | Solange Pereira; Edu Martins | 4:12 |
| 4. | "Agora eu Vou Andar (Andar Devagarinho)" | Cláudia Vargas | 3:55 |
| 5. | "Vamos em Frente" | Álvaro Socci; Claudio Matta; Vivian Peari | 3:37 |
| 6. | "Serenata do Grilo" | Michael Sullivan; Dudu Falcão | 4:23 |
| 7. | "Na Hora em Que Você Quiser Chegar" | Michael Sullivan; Dudu Falcao | 3:41 |
| Total length: | | | 26:57 |

Boas Notícias – CD edition
| No. | Title | Writer(s) | Length |
|---|---|---|---|
| 1. | "Xuxa Lelê" | Zé Henrique; Fred Pereira | 3:56 |
| 2. | "Libera Geral" | Álvaro Socci; Claudio Matta | 3:53 |
| 3. | "Diet" | Carlinhos Brown; Mestre Pintado de Bongo | 3:11 |
| 4. | "Planeta Xuxa" | Álvaro Socci; Claudio Matta | 3:17 |
| 5. | "Boas Notícias" | Michael Sullivan; Dudu Falcão | 3:53 |
| 6. | "Amarelinha (Pulando, Pulando)" | Zé Henrique; Fred Pereira | 3:39 |
| 7. | "Meu Xamego" | Solange Pereira; Edu Martins | 4:12 |
| 8. | "Agora eu Vou Andar (Andar Devagarinho)" | Cláudia Vargas | 3:55 |
| 9. | "Preste Atenção" | Renata Arruda; Mariana Richard | 4:08 |
| 10. | "Godofredo, o Piolho." | Marcos | 2:21 |
| 11. | "Vamos em Frente" | Álvaro Socci; Claudio Matta; Vivian Peari | 3:37 |
| 12. | "Serenata do Grilo" | Michael Sullivan; Dudu Falcão | 4:23 |
| 13. | "Oração de um Novo Milênio" | Solange Pereira; Edu Martins | 4:24 |
| 14. | "Na Hora em Que Você Quiser Chegar" | Michael Sullivan; Dudu Falcao | 3:41 |
| Total length: | | | 52:38 |

== Personnel ==
- Produced: Michael Sullivan and Zé Henrique
- Art Direction: Aramis Barros
- Recording Technician: Edu Oliveira, Sérgio Rocha and Mário Jorge
- Recorded in the studios: Som Livre
- Co-production: Zé Henrique, Marlene Mattos and Xuxa Meneghel
- Mixing Technicians: Jorge 'Gordo' Guimarães
- Production Assistant: Duda Nogueira
- Studio Coordination: Helio de Freitas
- Makeup: Free Sound and Sergio Seabra

== Certifications ==
| Region | Certification | Certified units/sales |
|---|---|---|
| Brazil (Pro-Música Brasil) | Platinum | 250,000^{*} |
^{*} Sales figures based on certification alone.
