= Xuxa só para Baixinhos 1 =

Só Para Baixinhos 1

Studio album by Xuxa
- Released: 5 October 2000
- Recorded: 2000
- Genre: Children's music
- Length: 38:48
- Label: Som Livre
- Producer: Zé Henrique

Xuxa chronology
| Xuxa 2000 (1999) | Só Para Baixinhos 1 (2000) | Xuxa só para Baixinhos 2 (2001) |

Singles from Xuxa só para Baixinhos 1
- 1. "Batatinha Bem Quentinha" Released: 2000; 2. "Cinco Patinhos" Released: 2000; 3. "Cabeça, Ombro, Joelho e Pé" Released: 2000

Xuxa só para Baixinhos 1 (also known as XSPB 1) (transl. Xuxa Only for Little Ones 1) is the twenty-third studio album by Brazilian recording artist Xuxa, is the debut album of the Só Para Baixinhos collection, was released on 5 October 2000 by Som Livre.

== Background ==
Unlike the focus of previous albums by the Brazilian television presenter Xuxa Meneghel, which were made to please both children and teenagers; "Xuxa só para Baixinhos" focuses on children in the age group between 1 and 5 years old. This decision to change audiences came about with the birth of Xuxa's daughter Sasha Meneghel. In this first edition, all tracks — with the exception of "A Borboleta" — are versions of songs from two children's projects: only two of these are from Hap Palmer (more specifically Baby Songs) and the remainder is from The Wiggles; these versions are made by producer and composer Vanessa Alves. The inspiration was not only limited to the tracks, but also to the visual project, where the aesthetic conception is practically the same as the original groups.

The track "A Borboleta" was composed by Renata Arruda, Mariana Richard and Chico Barbosa in honor of Bárbara Mattos Azevedo Lopes da Costa, Xuxa's goddaughter, who died on 14 December 1997, a victim of meningitis, at the age of 4.

== Release and reception ==
Xuxa só para Baixinhos 1 was released on 5 October 2000, first in CD and VHS version on its initial release date followed on DVD, in early 2001. It was re-released in the "CD + VHS" version in 2002, it was remastered and released on independent CD in 2008 in economy version. The songs that stood out on the album are "Cinco Patinhos", "Batatinha Bem Quentinha" and "Cabeça, Ombro, Joelho e Pé".

The album sold 500,000 copies on DVD and CD earning two gold and platinum discs respectively.

== Disclosure ==
=== Promotion ===
This first edition had one of the biggest, and possibly the best, promotions for an album in Xuxa's career. Before its official release in October, Xuxa already sang the track "Cinco Patinhos" at Xuxa Park. In addition to the highly successful song, songs such as "Batatinha Bem Quentinha", "Vamos Dizer Alô" and "Cabeça, Ombro, Joelho e Pé" were sung by Xuxa in the last seasons of the program. Two days after the arrival of the product in stores, the album received a launch on TV, in the Children's Day special at Xuxa Park, on 7 October 2000. Other forms of promotion, produced by Som Livre, also were made, such as printed advertisements in the main magazines with national circulation in the year, TV commercials, magazine covers about the project and promotions with long-term prize distribution.

=== Tour ===
"Só Para Baixinhos: O Show" was Xuxa's twelfth tour, the tour was based on the first 4 volumes of the "Só Para Baixinhos" series, the tour played in several cities in Brazil such as Belo Horizonte, Espírito Santo, Rio de Janeiro, Recife, Salvador, Porto Alegre, Maceió, São Luís, Natal and Goiânia. The idea for the XSPB project tour dates back to 2000, when it was launched. The accident during the Xuxa Park recordings, the project was cancelled. Despite being the presenter's return to the stage, it is a tour that is little known by the public. The show's scenario is very similar to that of the XSPB 2 project with some trees and clouds. The tour started on 16 August 2003, and ended in December of the same year.

== Track listing ==
Xuxa só para Baixinhos – CD edition
| No. | Title | Writer(s) | Length |
|---|---|---|---|
| 1. | "Dança do Macaco" (The Monkey Dance) | M Cook; J Fatt; A Field; G Page; J Field; Version: Vanessa Alves | 1:47 |
| 2. | "Atravessar a Rua" (Look Both Ways) | M Cook; J Fatt; A Field; G Page; J Field; Version: Vanessa Alves | 1:47 |
| 3. | "Batatinha Bem Quentinha" (Hot Potato) | M Cook; J Fatt; A Field; G Page; J Field; Version: Vanessa Alves | 1:23 |
| 4. | "Trenzinho" (Pufferbillies) | M Cook; J Fatt; A Field; G Page; Version: Vanessa Alves | 1:32 |
| 5. | "Cinco Patinhos" (Five Little Ducks) | M Cook; J Fatt; A Field; G Page; Version: Vanessa Alves | 2:06 |
| 6. | "Tão Grande" (So Big) | Hap Palmer; Version: Vanessa Alves | 2:42 |
| 7. | "Teddy, o Polvo" (Henry's Dance) | M Cook; J Fatt; A Field; G Page; J Field; Version: Vanessa Alves | 1:50 |
| 8. | "Shake Shake" (Shaky Shaky) | M Cook; J Fatt; A Field; G Page; Version: Vanessa Alves | 1:43 |
| 9. | "Rampa pa Mão" (Romp Bomp a Stomp) | M Cook; J Fatt; A Field; G Page; Version: Vanessa Alves | 2:07 |
| 10. | "Os Números (John Bradlelum) / Cabeça, Ombro, Joelho e Pé (Head, Shoulders, Knees & Toes)" | M Cook; J Fatt; A Field; G Page; Version: Vanessa Alves | 3:54 |
| 11. | "Guto Bate Com um Martelo" (Joannie Works With One Hammer) | M Cook; J Fatt; A Field; G Page; Version: Vanessa Alves | 1:40 |
| 12. | "Quack Quack" (Quack Quack) | M Cook; J Fatt; A Field; G Page; Version: Vanessa Alves | 1:56 |
| 13. | "Grite e Cochiche" (Shout and Whisper) | Hap Palmer; Version: Vanessa Alves | 2:19 |
| 14. | "Vamos Dizer Alô" (We Like to Say Hello) | M Cook; J Fatt; A Field; G Page; Version: Vanessa Alves | 2:02 |
| 15. | "A Borboleta" | Renata Arruda; Mariana Richard; Chico Barbosa | 4:42 |
| Total length: | | | 33:37 |

Xuxa só para Baixinhos – DVD and VHS edition
| No. | Title | Writer(s) | Length |
|---|---|---|---|
| 1. | "Introdução" | | 1:01 |
| 2. | "Batatinha Bem Quentinha" (Hot Potato) | M Cook; J Fatt; A Field; G Page; J Field; Version: Vanessa Alves | 1:23 |
| 3. | "Passagem (A Dança do Macaco)" | | 0:23 |
| 4. | "Dança do Macaco" (The Monkey Dance) | M Cook; J Fatt; A Field; G Page; J Field; Version: Vanessa Alves | 1:47 |
| 5. | "Passagem (A Dança do Teddy)" | | 0:20 |
| 6. | "Teddy, o Polvo" (Henry's Dance) | M Cook; J Fatt; A Field; G Page; J Field; Version: Vanessa Alves | 1:50 |
| 7. | "Passagem Musical ("A Borboleta" (remix))" | | 0:15 |
| 8. | "Trenzinho" (Pufferbillies) | M Cook; J Fatt; A Field; G Page; Version: Vanessa Alves | 1:32 |
| 9. | "Passagem (Tamanho)" | | 0:34 |
| 10. | "Tão Grande" (So Big) | Hap Palmer; Version: Vanessa Alves | 2:42 |
| 11. | "Passagem (Preparados para o "Shake Shake")" | | 0:25 |
| 12. | "Shake Shake" (Shaky Shaky) | M Cook; J Fatt; A Field; G Page; Version: Vanessa Alves | 1:43 |
| 13. | "Passagem (Massinha)" | | 0:22 |
| 14. | "Guto Bate Com um Martelo" (Joannie Works With One Hammer) | M Cook; J Fatt; A Field; G Page; Version: Vanessa Alves | 1:40 |
| 15. | "Passagem Musical ("A Borboleta" (remix))" | | 0:08 |
| 16. | "Atravessar a Rua" (Look Both Ways) | M Cook; J Fatt; A Field; G Page; J Field; Version: Vanessa Alves | 1:47 |
| 17. | "Passagem (Números)" | | 0:23 |
| 18. | "Os Números (John Bradlelum) / Cabeça, Ombro, Joelho e Pé (Head, Shoulders, Knees & Toes)" ("John Bradlelum" e "Head, Shoulders, Knees and Toes") | M Cook; J Fatt; A Field; G Page; Version: Vanessa Alves | 3:54 |
| 19. | "Passagem Musical ("A Borboleta" (remix))" | | 0:10 |
| 20. | "Grite e Cochiche" (Shout and Whisper) | Hap Palmer; Version: Vanessa Alves | 2:19 |
| 21. | "Passagem (Brincadeiras)" | | 0:17 |
| 22. | "Quack Quack" (Quack Quack) | M Cook; J Fatt; A Field; G Page; Version: Vanessa Alves | 1:56 |
| 23. | "Passagem Musical ("A Borboleta" (remix))" | | 0:13 |
| 24. | "Rampa pa Mão" (Romp Bomp a Stomp) | M Cook; J Fatt; A Field; G Page; Version: Vanessa Alves | 2:07 |
| 25. | "Passagem Musical ("A Borboleta" (remix))" | | 0:14 |
| 26. | "Cinco Patinhos" (Five Little Ducks) | M Cook; J Fatt; A Field; G Page; Version: Vanessa Alves | 2:06 |
| 27. | "Passagem Musical ("A Borboleta" (remix))" | | 0:07 |
| 28. | "Vamos Dizer Alô" (We Like to Say Hello) | M Cook; J Fatt; A Field; G Page; Version: Vanessa Alves | 2:02 |
| 29. | "A Borboleta" | Renata Arruda; Mariana Richard; Chico Barbosa | 4:42 |
| 30. | "A Borboleta (créditos)" (Remix) | Renata Arruda; Mariana Richard; Chico Barbosa | 1:30 |
| Total length: | | | 38:48 |

== Personnel ==
- Art Direction: Aramis Barros
- Art Coordination: Marlene Mattos e Xuxa Meneghel
- Production: Zé Henrique
- Recording Engineer: Everson Dias, Val Martins, Marcelão e Sergio Knust
- Recording Assistants: Wellington (Garoto) e Paulinho Baldes
- Masterização: Sergio Seabra
- Recorded in studios: Yahoo
- Mixing Technicians: Jorge "Gordo" Guimarães
- Arrangements: Yahoo
- Recording Assistant: Claudio Oliveira

== Certifications ==
| Region | Certification | Certified units/sales |
|---|---|---|
| Brazil (Pro-Música Brasil) CD | Platinum | 250,000^{*} |
| Brazil (Pro-Música Brasil) DVD | 2× Gold | 50,000^{*} |
| Brazil (Pro-Música Brasil) | 2× Platinum | 500,000^{‡} |
^{*} Sales figures based on certification alone.^{‡} Sales+streaming figures based on certification alone.
