= Xuxa Hits =

- Genre: Music
- Directed by: Marlene Mattos
- Presented by: Xuxa Meneghel
- Country of origin: Brazil
- Original language: Portuguese
- No. of episodes: 15

Production
- Running time: 1 hour

Original release
- Network: TV Globo
- Release: 8 January – 16 April 1995

Related
- Xuxa Park (1994-2001); Planeta Xuxa (1997-2002)

Xuxa Hits is a Brazilian music television hit parade, hosted by Xuxa Meneghel at TV Globo, which started on 8 January and ended on 16 April 1995. In fact, it was a Sunday replay of the musical block of Xuxa Park, in the first season of 1994, when the scenario was simple to the central title "Xuxa Park Hits". Until the end of these reruns, on April 29 of the same year, the program is again transformed into a segment of Xuxa Park.

What was just a block of Xuxa Park, became a immediate success as an independent program, in a similar way as the BBC's Top of the Pops, Xuxa received contemporary artists, disc jockey and singers, featuring music videos. Due to the change of members, the Paquitas group also changed their costumes (from mine workers during the 1994 season to schoolgirls in 1995). Xuxa also won the help of the "You Can Dance", also gained the support of the male dance group "You Can Dance" which replaced the "Paquitos" that were dissolved at the end of the Xou da Xuxa in 1992. This group was also part of the team at the time of the dance, during this short season, Xuxa wore a themed look for each show, ranging from Napoleon to Geisha, and her entrances at the beginning of the show matched her costume.The separate program served as a test for the presenter to analyze the possibilities of presenting a program on Sunday afternoons and would last only three months as a rerun. However, the audience would be higher than that of the full program on Saturday.And in April 1997 it was adapted and received the name of Planeta Xuxa, a Xou da Xuxa version for the grounded.The show gained high popularity immediately and would have its schedule changed from Saturday afternoon to Sunday given the positive impact that in a short time made it a local television classic.

== Concept ==
With the success of Xuxa Park Hits, from Xuxa Park, TV Globo decided to transform it into an independent program on Sunday afternoons under the name Xuxa Hits. During its Sunday show, the attraction counted only with reruns of some editions recorded for the Park in 1994. The intention was that after the vacations of Xuxa, the program followed in the hour with unpublished editions.

== Scenery ==
The scenery was elaborate, in the center of the stage it had a catwalk with two stairs, and above the catwalk was a completely round entrance of paper where Xuxa came in, rescuing the paper that covered the entrance with the logo of the Xuxa Hits. The stage was like a set of houses, the walls were in black and gray stripes.

== Cancellation ==
Dissatisfied with the program, Xuxa asked for it to be canceled. The presenter argued that making Xuxa Hits an independent program would make Xuxa Park lose the features of a variety show. With the request of Xuxa, the attraction returned to the air as a segment of Xuxa Park on April 29, 1995 gaining scenery and exclusive time.
