= Xuxa Park =

- Genre: Children; Game show
- Directed by: Marlene Mattos
- Starring: Xuxa Meneghel; Paquitas; Topo Gigio
- Country of origin: Spain
- Original language: Spanish
- No. of seasons: 1
- No. of episodes: 15

Production
- Producer: Michael Jay Solomon
- Running time: 1h30 min

Original release
- Network: Telecinco
- Release: March 12 – June 18, 1992

Related
- Xou da Xuxa; El Show de Xuxa; Xuxa; Xuxa Park (1994)

Xuxa Park is a Spanish children's television series hosted by Xuxa Meneghel, based on the Xou da Xuxa, produced by Michael Jay Solomon and screened from March 12 to June 18, 1992 by the Madrid network Telecinco, the third largest broadcaster of Spain in audience, totaling 15 episodes. The show worked with several blocks, where in each block a game is presented, counting on the participation of the Paquitas and the character Topo Gigio, a character that was very popular around the world.

== Background ==
Xuxa became a household name throughout Latin America thanks to its children's television program El Show de Xuxa produced in Argentina during the years 1991 and 1993, and aired in 17 Latin American countries and United States by Univision, with an estimated audience of 25 million viewers.

She caught the attention of the Spanish public ever since starring on two TV shows on Telecinco a year earlier in 1991, and the annual releases of her international albums, as well as song, that had become popular there.

== Development ==
Xuxa Park was filmed in Telecinco studios Barcelona, on a soundstage replicating an amusement park, in a with a format partly similar to Xou da Xuxa. The guests were usually singers, circus performers, and comic groups. Another feature maintained from the Brazilian program was the maintenance of the auditorium show format with games and other interactions with the audience. The novelty in relation to Brazilian and Latin American productions was that this show was family-oriented, which allowed families to participate during the games.

== Release ==
Xuxa Park premiered on March 12, 1992, and was aired weekly on Sundays, totaling 15 episodes, each with an hour and-a-half during the spring schedule of Telecinco, Madrid's station with national reach, which holds 50% of the Spanish audience - which places second place after of the La 1. Before the launch of the show, a Press conference was organized by the issuer to present formally Xuxa and Paquitas to the public.

== Reception and ratings ==
The program was an instant success and considerably increased the network's ratings during the time slot in which it was shown. Less than five months after the premiere, Tele 5 approached Xuxa Produções to offer a contract renewal in view of a possible second season. But, negotiations did not progress since the host and her team were in the United States recording the American version of the show at the same time that the presenter had a busy schedule in Latin America.

Xuxa Park conquered high ratings: 45 points (an estimated audience of 25 million people).

== See also ==
- El Show de Xuxa
- Xuxa Park (Brazilian TV series)
