= Xuxa (American TV program) =

American children's television series

- Genre: Children; Variety Entertainment
- Written by: Thomas W. Lynch
- Directed by: Gary Halvorson
- Presented by: Xuxa Meneghel
- Starring: E. E. Bell; Mark Caso; Natasha Pearce; Jeff Dunham
- Opening theme: Xuxa and Her Friends (O Xou da Xuxa Começou) – Xuxa
- Ending theme: "Xuxa and Her Friends" (Instrumental)
- Composers: Dido Oliveira, version: Eric Thorngren and David Wolff
- Country of origin: United States
- Original language: English
- No. of seasons: 1
- No. of episodes: 65

Production
- Executive producers: Thomas W. Lynch; Marlene Mattos
- Producers: Xuxa; John D. Lynch
- Production locations: Television City Studios; Hollywood, California
- Running time: 22 minutes
- Production companies: Lynch Productions; MTM Enterprises

Original release
- Network: Syndicated
- Release: September 13 – December 10, 1993

Related
- Xou da Xuxa; El Show de Xuxa; Xuxa Park

Xuxa is an American children's television series hosted by Xuxa Meneghel that aired in first-run syndication between September 13 and December 10, 1993, for a total of 65 episodes. The program was based on Rede Globo's Xou da Xuxa and was adapted by Thomas W. Lynch and Marlene Mattos, with MTM Enterprises handling production. The show is made up of various segments of games, famous guests, and educational lessons. The program was shown along with reruns from 1993 to 1997.

As a consequence of the global success of the presenter and her program, in 1992, Xuxa's success and impact crossed borders, reaching the United States through the large Latin community that watched the El Show de Xuxa through Univision, creating local demands for a version of the same aimed at the United States. and as a consequence of this, two American television production companies approached Rede Globo and Xuxa Produções interested in producing a version aimed at the American market and potentially other countries. MTM Enterprises and DIC Entertainment were the interested parties. However, Xuxa Produções selected MTM Enterprises because of the proposal that was very similar to what was done in Brazil and Argentina.

The program debuted in September 1993; and was an adaptation of Xou da Xuxa, but with several changes made with the American market in mind. For example, the already known pink spaceship was removed and replaced by a terrestrial globe and there was also a change of wardrobe, since the presenter was moving around all the time there was a need for tighter clothes, but more conservative than those worn in Brazil. The stage assistants and Xuxa's crew, known as Paquitas won the name "Pixies" and represented the multiculturalism of American society with three others being hired specifically for production, while the rest were from Brazil. His other stage assistants Prague and Dengue were replaced by a jaguar named Jam and a panda bear named Jelly, who were played by Mark Caso and EE Bell respectively. Even though it was a short-lived program, Xuxa is still the only Brazilian to have a program named after her on American television.

== Background ==
Xuxa was a blend of a variety show and a game show. The show featured various activities that stimulated children's learning, presented by Xuxa and her assistants, The Pixies, Jelly the Panda (E. E. Bell) and Jam the Jaguar (Mark Caso).

The show was divided into about five segments, with breaks for commercials, following the original format. During the segments, Xuxa called the kids onstage to participate in interactive games, and everyone won a prize in the end regardless of the outcome. In other segments, Xuxa interviews various professionals (such as skaters, swimmers, animal trainers, etc.). She also received celebrities to interact with her and the children, and in many cases presented themselves with musical or cultural performances as was the case with Mary-Kate and Ashley Olsen and Raven Symoné. Xuxa also sang English versions of her songs on the show, and ended the show with a child from the audience being chosen to receive a kiss on the cheek.

== History ==
=== Background ===
As a TV personality in Brazil and the rest of Latin America, Xuxa was extremely successful in the late 1980s and early 1990s. She hosted her own children's programs, Xou da Xuxa and their Latin American version El Show de Xuxa which were broadcast in the United States by Univision, repeating the phenomenon with the Latin community. In late 1991, two American production companies, MTM Enterprises and DIC Entertainment, approached Rede Globo and Xuxa Produções to produce an American version of the show. Both Xuxa and Rede Globo were initially hesitant, since neither she nor her associates spoke fluent English at the time.

=== Development and release ===
During 1992, Xuxa received proposals from various media around the world to present various programs, but the one that caught her most attention was the United States and Canada markets, as it was the only one in the Americas where she had never ventured. Thus, negotiations with interested parties begin. While DIC Entertainment wanted to create a whole new specific show, MTM Enterprises wanted to do a project based on the Xou da Xuxa. Feeling more secure and satisfied, both she and her team chose the second proposal, as this aligned more closely with her own ambition for an American program. Slated to run for 65 episodes in the first season, the American program was recorded in CBS Studios in Hollywood, with a syndicated run on The Family Channel. As the original version, the show was made for children and pre-teenagers between 2–11 years of age. Another factor that influenced the choice was that the MTM Productions and they were one of the most acclaimed TV producers of the 1970s and 1980s.

Expenditures around weekly production were budgeted between US$150,000 to $200,000 according to Broadcasting & Cable magazine. The set design was a high priority, with a design based on different places around the world. It had the capacity to receive 150 to 200 children per recording day. The stage had been used for six weeks of recording with cumulative cost estimates of more than $2 million.

To some observers, Xuxa's entry into the dominant American market reminded her of another multitalented Brazilian celebrity; commenting on the movement, the editor of Brazil magazine in Los Angeles wrote that "since Carmen Miranda, Brazil did not have an exportable artist."

Expectations about the premiere were high, since even before it, the recordings had been completed with satisfactory results from the producers and to promote the production. She was scheduled to appear on Good Morning America to give a little interview, but the participation ended up being canceled at the last minute. A few hours later, it was discovered that Xuxa was hospitalized due to a fainting spell that occurred minutes before she went on air. The results of subsequent exams indicated that she had suffered drug intoxication due to incorrect treatment for a herniated disc crisis, which was the result of a work overload during that period. Immediately, she and her team returned to Brazil and the resumption of production was suspended indefinitely.

The following year, the contract with MTM was resumed and new inserts were recorded by Xuxa in Brazil for reworked for some specific markets in which new segments or unaired were inserted.

Broadcast by a pool of 100 stations and with an average of 3 million viewers per episode, significant numbers, Xuxa lasted only one season on The Family Channel (renamed Freeform in 2018), remaining on the air between 1993 and 1997, including reruns.

== Controversy ==
Shortly after Xuxa signed with MTM, the tabloid Globe published a polemic full-page article titled "Sacred Cow", written by Bob Michals. The article criticized both Xuxa and MTM Enterprises part-owner Pat Robertson, and included the text "Pay-TV preacher invites porn queen to present his new show for kids". It also noted that Xuxa had appeared on the cover of the Brazilian edition of Playboy as well as her role in the film Love Strange Love, where her character, an underage girl, is seen seducing an underage boy. Michals described Xuxa as a "provocative woman, who presents her show tucked in a pair of slacks or micro-shorts, high-top boots and revealing jackets."

MTM spokesman Gary Berberet tried to soften the controversy by saying, "We knew of her [Xuxa's] past, but she brings so much joy to the children of the world that we would not stop her from bringing this joy to America too." The article also featured statements by David Harrel, biographer of Pat Robertson: "Like every successful religious figure, Robertson does not separate God's voice from the voice of opportunity."

== Awards ==
The program was nominated in 1994 for a Daytime Emmy Award in the category of Best Art Direction / Set Decoration / Scenography.

== Episodes ==
- Ed Alonzo (5 episodes)
- Alvin and the Chipmunks
- American Gladiators
- Birthday Party
- Deborah Blando
- Butterfly Man (2 episodes)
- Rudy Coby (2 episodes)
- Jeff Dunham (2 episodes)
- Joan Embery (2 episodes)
- Exposé
- Michael Feinstein (2 episodes)
- Mitch Gaylord & trampoline
- Bob Golic
- Harlem Globetrotters
- Woody Itson
- Waylon Jennings (2 episodes)
- Jugglers
- Juggling Duo The Mums
- David Larible
- Amos Levkovitch
- Ronn Lucas (2 episodes)
- Macho Man Randy Savage
- Cheech Marin
- Marsupial
- Marty Putz
- Mess of Mutts (2 episodes)
- Mongolian Acrobats
- Robert Nelson
- Mark Nizer
- Olga the Gymnast
- Olsen Twins (2 episodes)
- Orangutan
- Matt Plendl (2 episodes)
- Marty Putz
- Raven-Symoné
- Rebel Ropers
- Ringling Bros. and Barnum & Bailey Circus
- Skate Squad
- Team Rollerblade
- Universal Studios Animals
- "Weird Al" Yankovic
- Kim Zmeskal

== Home video and merchandise ==
=== VHS: Funtastic Birthday Party and Celebration with Cheech Marin ===
The show received five volumes on VHS, released in 1994 by The Family Channel and Sony Wonder. Two VHS issues are highly sought after today: Funtastic Birthday Party and Celebration with Cheech Marin.

=== Dolls ===
Rose Art Industries launched a line of Xuxa dolls at the American International Toy Fair in 1993, before the show debuted. The dolls, featuring Xuxa's likeness, were the same size as the famous Barbie doll, and were sold alone for $5.99, or for $24.99 with accessories. The fashion doll was launched across North America, and quickly became the top-selling ethnic doll in the United States, with 500 dolls sold over the debut weekend. The doll's debut took place on the Toys 'R' Us Toys Network. Sale of the dolls exceeded expectations, and after the first 200,000 dolls were sold, Rose Art had to manufacture 50,000 more to keep up with demand. The dolls also came with a little K7 tape with songs by Xuxa in English. These tapes were titled "Xuxa, The Real Superstar".
