= Xuxa só para Baixinhos 3 – Country =

Só para Baixinhos 3 – Country

Studio album by Xuxa
- Released: 31 August 2002
- Recorded: 2002
- Studios: Yahoo Studio, Rio de Janeiro, RJ
- Genres: Children's music; country
- Length: 51:38
- Label: Som Livre
- Producer: Zé Henrique

Xuxa chronology
Só para Baixinhos Vol. 2 (2001)	Só para Baixinhos 3 – Country (2002)	Só para Baixinhos Vol. 4 (2003)

Singles from Xuxa só Para Baixinhos 3
- 1. "Vamos Brincar" Released: 2002; 2. "Bumbum, Como É Bom Ser Lelé" Released: 2002; 3. "Imitando os Animais" Released: 2002

Xuxa só Para Baixinhos 3 – Country (also known as XSPB 3) (transl. Only for Children Three – Country) is the twenty-fifth studio album by Brazilian recording artist Xuxa, released on 31 August 2002 by Som Livre as the third album in the collection Só Para Baixinhos.

== Release and reception ==
Xuxa só Para Baixinhos 3 - Country, was released by Som Livre on August 31, 2002, in the CD and VHS version and Released on DVD shortly thereafter, was remastered and released on independent CD in 2008 in economic version. The singles were "Vamos Brincar", "Bumbum, Como É Bom Ser Lelé" and "Imitando os Animais".

XSPB 3 sold more than 1,000,000 copies, receiving gold certification. It was the most sold album in Brazil in 2002, according to the Associação Brasileira dos Produtores de Discos (ABPD). With Xuxa só Para Baixinhos 3, Xuxa won for the second consecutive time the Latin Grammy Award for Best Latin Children's Album.

== Awards ==
=== Latin Grammy Awards ===
At the 4th Annual Latin Grammy Awards in 2002, the album received one awards:

- Latin Grammy Award for Best Latin Children's Album

== Track listing ==
All lyrics translated by Vanessa Alves.

Xuxa só para Baixinhos 3 – CD edition
No.	Title	Writer(s)	Length
1.	"Vamos Brincar" (Down By The Bay)	D. P., arranged by Raffi and Ken Whiteley	2:00
2.	"Mosca Sai" (Flick a Fly)	Hap Palmer	1:48
3.	"Bumbum Como é Bom Ser Lelé" (Boom Boom, Ain't it Great to be Crazy?)	D. P., arranged by David Bernard Wolf	1:32
4.	"Imitando os Animais" (Animal Action)	Greg Scelsa; Christopher Moroney; Covita Moroney	2:01
5.	"Sou um Jacaré" (I'm an Alligator)	Gary Driskell; Ron Kingery; Stephen Elkins	1:45
6.	"Vem Dançar Com o Txutxucão" (Wave to Wags)	The Wiggles (M Cook, J Fatt, A Field and G Page) and J Field	1:45
7.	"Papi, o Camelo" (Sally, The Camel)	D. P., arranged by Bob Singleton	2:00
8.	"Como é Bom Pular" (Gotta Hop)	David Jack	3:04
9.	"Vamos no Shake" (Shake Your Sillies Out)	Raffi; Bert Simpson; Bonnie Simpson	2:19
10.	"O Coelinho Fufu" (Little Bunny Foo Foo)	D. P., arranged by Cal Scott	3:04
11.	"Mexa os Dedinhos" (Put your fingers on the air)	Woody Guthrie	2:49
12.	"Por quê?" (Why?)	Joseph Phillips; Tony Peugh	2:00
13.	"Os Três Carneirinhos" (Three Billy Goats Gruff)	Greg Scelsa; Mike Lewis	4:36
14.	"O Sapinho Saiu Pra Passear" (A Frog Went a Walking)	D. P., arranged by The Wiggles (M Cook, J Fatt, A Field and G Page)	2:54
15.	"Se eu Fosse" (The Gorilla Song)	John and Jay Knowles	2:27
16.	"Pot-Pourri: Pôneis / Cavalinhos" ("Ponies" / "Listen To The Horses")	The Wiggles (M Cook, J Fatt, A Field and G Page) / David Eddleman, Neva Aubin, Elizabeth Crook and Erma Hayden	2:51
17.	"Quantas Estrelas Tem no Céu?" (Can I Count The Stars?)	Joseph Phillips; Russel Riddle; Joyce Slocum	2:29
Total length:			37:34

Xuxa só para Baixinhos 3 – DVD and VHS editing
No.	Title	Writer(s)	Length
1.	"Introdução"		0:46
2.	"Vamos Brincar" (Down By The Bay)	D. P., arranged by Raffi and Ken Whiteley	2:00
3.	"Passage (Children: Happy)"		0:22
4.	"Bumbum Como é Bom Ser Lelé" (Boom Boom, Ain't it Great to be Crazy?)	D. P., arranged by David Bernard Wolf	1:32
5.	"Passage (Children: Fly)"		0:05
6.	"Mosca Sai" (Flick a Fly)	Hap Palmer	1:48
7.	"Passage (Children: Animals)"		0:16
8.	"Imitando os Animais" (Animal Action)	Greg Scelsa; Christopher Moroney; Covita Moroney	2:01
9.	"Passage (Children: Jacaré)"		0:46
10.	"Sou um Jacaré" (I'm an Alligator)	Gary Driskell; Ron Kingery; Stephen Elkins	1:45
11.	"Passage (Children: "Dançando Com o Txutxucão")"		1:18
12.	"Vem Dançar Com o Txutxucão" (Wave to Wags)	The Wiggles (M Cook, J Fatt, A Field and G Page) and J Field	1:45
13.	"O Sapinho Saiu Pra Passear" (A Frog Went a Walking)	D. P., arranged by The Wiggles (M Cook, J Fatt, A Field and G Page)	2:59
14.	"Passage (Camel)"		0:07
15.	"Papi, o Camelo" (Sally, The Camel)	D. P., arranged by Bob Singleton	2:00
16.	"Passage (Children: Say what you want)"		0:22
17.	"Como é Bom Pular" (Gotta Hop)	David Jack	3:04
18.	"Passagem (Children: Little butterfly)"		0:23
19.	"Vamos no Shake" (Shake Your Sillies Out)	Raffi; Bert Simpson; Bonnie Simpson	2:19
20.	"Passage (Introduction of "O Coelinho Fufu")"		0:20
21.	"O Coelinho Fufu" (Little Bunny Foo Foo)	D. P., arranged by Cal Scott	3:04
22.	"Passage (Children: Kids songs)"		0:38
23.	"Mexa os Dedinhos" (Put Your Finger In The Air)	Woody Guthrie	2:52
24.	"Passage (Children: Children's Stories)"		1:04
25.	"Por quê?" (Why?)	Joseph Phillips; Tony Peugh	2:02
26.	"Passage (Children: Cat), (Do not Shoot Your Cat) e (Introduction of "Os Três Carneirinhos")"		1:06
27.	"Os Três Carneirinhos" (Three Billy Goats Gruff)	Greg Scelsa; Mike Lewis	4:36
28.	"Passage (Sasha: Dad in the pocket and Mom in the heart)"		0:20
29.	"Se eu Fosse" (The Gorilla Song)	John and Jay Knowles	2:27
30.	"Passage (Children: Horse)"		0:04
31.	"Pot-Pourri: Pôneis / Cavalinhos" ("Ponies" / "Listen To The Horses")	The Wiggles (M Cook, J Fatt, A Field and G Page) / David Eddleman, Neva Aubin, Elizabeth Crook and Erma Hayden	2:51
32.	"Passage (Children: Our Father)"		0:55
33.	"Quantas Estrelas Tem no Céu?" (Can I Count The Stars?)	Joseph Phillips; Russel Riddle; Joyce Slocum	2:32
34.	"Credits (Sasha and Rian: Little Red Riding Hood)"		3:00
Total length:			51:38

== Personnel ==
- Xuxa Meneghel — lead vocals
- Lelo Zaneta de Oliveira — bass and backing vocals; voice (5)
- Doca Pinheiro — acoustic and electric guitars, vocals
- Henrique Ferretti — drums and percussion

=== Guest musicians ===
- Rick Ferreira — acoustic and electric guitars, banjo, steel guitar
- Carlos Eduardo Hack — fiddle; percussion (10)
- Henrique Brasil — keyboards and vocals
- Marcelo Lobato — keyboards
- Tutuca Borba — strings
- Vagner Canteiro — trombone
- Jorge Continentino — soprano, alto, and baritone saxophones
- Milton Guedes — harmonica and whistle
- Eduardo Lyra — percussion
- Christiane Monteiro — guitar and vocals
- Cidashi Castro, Gabriel Miranda, and Glice de Paula — vocals

=== Guest appearances ===
- Julia Peixoto — guest appearance (3)
- Sasha Meneghel Sfazir — guest appearance (9)

=== Characters ===
- Lelo Zaneta de Oliveira as Txutxucão, the Big Bad Wolf, the Oldest Billy Gruff Goat, and the Fairy Godmother
- Carlos Eduardo Hack as the Frog, the Cat, the Monkey, the Cow, the Dog, and Bussolar
- Marcelo Falca as a Caipira
- Alcina Milagrez as a Woman and the Youngest Billy Gruff Goat
- Aline Barros as Xuxinha
  - Barros also voices the Middle Billy Gruff Goat.
- Carlos Gouveia as Guto

The male laughters are provided by Lelo Zaneta de Oliveira and Carlos Eduardo Hack. The female laughters were provided by Alcina Milagrez.

=== Production ===
- Xuxa Meneghel — art direction and production
- Zé Henrique — musical production
- Leonardo de Souza (Mikimba) — sound effect artist
- Everson Dias and Sergio Knust — recording engineers
- Silvio Limeira (Silva), Paulinho Viralata, and Marcos Bagalha — assistants
- Eduardo Chermont — mixing
- Everson Dias (Vidal) — sound effect artist and production assistant

The entire album was recorded and mixed by Yahoo Studio in Rio de Janeiro, RJ in 2002.

== Certifications ==
Region	Certification	Certified units/sales
Brazil (Pro-Música Brasil) CD	Gold	1,000,000
Brazil (Pro-Música Brasil)	2× Platinum	500,000^{‡}
^{‡} Sales+streaming figures based on certification alone.
