= Tô de Bem com a Vida =

Studio album by Xuxa
- Released: October 5, 1996
- Recorded: 1996
- Genres: Axé; lambada
- Length: 52:34
- Label: Som Livre
- Producer: Michael Sullivan

Xuxa chronology
Luz no Meu Caminho (1995)	Tô de Bem com a Vida (1996)	Boas Notícias (1997)

Singles from Tô de Bem com a Vida
- 1. "Tô de Bem com a Vida" Released: 1996; 2. "Xuxaxé" Released: 1996; 3. "Lá Vai A Loura (La Balladora)" Released: 1996; 4. "Ai, Ai, Ai" Released: 1996; 5. "Brincar De Rimar" Released: 1996

Tô de Bem com a Vida (English: I'm Ok with life) is the seventeenth studio album by Brazilian recording artist Xuxa Meneghel. It was released on October 5, 1996, by Som Livre.

Like Sexto Sentido (1994) and Luz no Meu Caminho (1995), Tô de Bem com a Vida was designed with the aim of appealing to both children and teenagers, as the Xuxa audience continued to follow their work. The album has as its main bet the Axé. The rhythms and culture of Brazil are very present in the album in tracks like "Quadrilha Da Xuxa", representing the June Festival and "Vaqueiro Vai Buscar Meu Boi", which portrays folklore.

Tô de Bem com a Vida was the first album by a Brazilian artist to be released simultaneously on TV, radio and internet. It was later certified platinum by Pro-Música Brasil (PMB).

== Production and songs ==
In a climate of celebration due to the 10 years of Rede Globo, Xuxa wanted an album that reflected her current state of mind, and this was the main inspiration of the album that counts on only two slow songs. The highlight of the album is the mix of Brazilian rhythms and themes. Axé came as the biggest bet with songs like "Tô De Bem Com A Vida" and "Xuxaxé", in addition to "Carnaxuxa" that portrays how is the carnival in the different corners of Brazil.

Still in the Culture of Brazil issue, was composed "A Caravela De Cabral", who talks about the history of the discovery of Brazil and "Vaqueiro Vai Buscar Meu Boi", which brings a bit of folklore to the album. "Ai, Ai, Ai" was originally composed for the singer Falcão. When Zé Henrique (songwriter) showed the song to the manager of Xuxa at the time, Marlene Mattos, she decided that the presenter would record the song for the album, arguing that the singer was irreverent and would marry the proposal of the album.

The track "Brincar De Rimar" is a re-recording of Fofão, but with the letter altered. In the passage that quotes the character, his name is replaced by that of Xuxa. The song "Amiga", composition in homage to Marlene Mattos, was recorded without the manager knew. The music video was also recorded as a surprise to the manager. The album was entirely produced by Michael Sullivan.

== Release and reception ==
Tô de Bem com a Vida It was released by Som Livre on October 5, 1996, in CD, cassette and LP being the last released in this format. Tô de Bem com a Vida, was later certified platinum by Pro-Música Brasil (PMB) after selling 250,000 within the country.

== Promotion ==
Tô de Bem com a Vida was well publicized in Xuxa Park, as well as the homonymous music that was sung several times in the program and in the frame Xuxa Hits. In addition to singing some of the songs in his attraction, Xuxa participated twice in Domingão do Faustão, the first on September 29 and the second on October 6 where he was honored in the framework of the program Confidential Archive.

Some of the songs won music videos on the specials of Children's Day and Christmas of 1996, these were: "Tô De Bem Com A Vida", "Xuxaxé", "Lá Vai A Loura", "Brincar De Rimar", "Ai, Ai, Ai" and "A Chuva". The "Amiga" video was only shown in 1998 in one of the editions of Xuxa 12 years.

In November 1996, Xuxa began the tour of the album by Brazil that extends until December 1997. The show that happened through several cities, was attended by more than 500 thousand people.

== Track listing ==
No.	Title	Writer(s)	Length
1.	"Tô De Bem Com A Vida"	Cláudio Matta; Álvaro Socci; Vivian Pearl	3:01
2.	"Lá Vai A Loura (La Balladora)"	Alfonso Vallejo Salinas; Versão: Cid Guerreiro	4:30
3.	"Xuxaxé"	Dudu Falcão; Michael Sullivan	3:26
4.	"Carnaxuxa"	Cid Guerreiro	4:05
5.	"A Caravela De Cabral"	Dudu Falcão; Michael Sullivan	3:36
6.	"Ai, Ai, Ai"	Zé Henrique; Cátia Pereira	4:04
7.	"Brincar De Rimar"	Terry Winter; Nil Bernardes	3:06
8.	"Huppa Hulle (Hoopa Hoole)" (featuring Andréia Sorvetão)	Zohar Laskov; Version: Vanessa Alves and Felipe Bella	3:08
9.	"A Peteca"	Zé Henrique; Cátia Pereira; Ângela Mattos	4:03
10.	"Ficção"	Cláudio Matta; Álvaro Socci	4:12
11.	"Quadrilha Da Xuxa"	Carlos Colla; Elias Muniz	3:18
12.	"Vaqueiro Vai Buscar Meu Boi"	Josias Sobrinho	4:02
13.	"A Chuva"	Cláudio Matta; Álvaro Socci	3:50
14.	"Amiga"	Cláudio Matta; Álvaro Socci	4:02
Total length:			52:34

== Personnel ==
- Produced: Michael Sullivan
- Art Direction: Aramis Barros
- Recording Technician: Mario Jorge and Sergio Rocha
- Mixing: Som Livre
- Technical Mixer: Sergio 'Gordo' Guimarães
- Recorded in the studios: Som Livre
- Production Assistant: Duda Nogueira
- Studio Coordination: Helio de Freitas
- Mastering: Som Livre - Sergio Seabra
- Recording Assistants: Everaldo, Claudio Oliveira, Julio Carneiro, Ivan Carvalho and Mauro

== Certifications ==
Region	Certification	Certified units/sales
Brazil (Pro-Música Brasil)	Platinum	250,000^{*}
^{*} Sales figures based on certification alone.
