= Xuxa no Mundo da Imaginação =

Brazilian children's television series

- Genre: Children
- Created by: Xuxa Meneghel
- Directed by: Mário Meirelles
- Presented by: Xuxa Meneghel
- Opening theme: "Mundo da Imaginação" (2002-2004) "Imaginação" (2004)
- Ending theme: "Mundo da Imaginação" (2002)
- Country of origin: Brazil
- Original language: Portuguese
- No. of seasons: 3
- No. of episodes: 565

Production
- Production location: Projac
- Running time: 40 minutes

Original release
- Network: TV Globo
- Release: 28 October 2002 – 31 December 2004

Related
- Planeta Xuxa (1997-2002); TV Xuxa (2005-2014)

Xuxa no Mundo da Imaginação (transl. Xuxa in the World of Imagination) is a Brazilian children's television series hosted by Xuxa Meneghel at TV Globo, shown Monday through Friday between 28 October 2002 and 31 December 2004.

== Concept ==
Since 2001, Xuxa's goal was to re-dedicate the children, because since the tragic end of Xuxa Park, it was linked with Planeta Xuxa, a program that was shown on Sundays and dedicated to young people. After her long-term partnership with businesswoman Marlene Matos, Xuxa ended up with the Planeta and dedicated himself to creates the Mundo da Imaginação show. The program was a children's program presented by Xuxa Meneghel, directed by Mário Meirelles, Pedro Vasconcelos and Pedro Bretas, general direction of Mario Meirelles, texts by Antônio Carvalho, Péricles Barros, Cláudio Lobato, Luciana Sandroni, Mariana Mesquita, Guto Lins and Alessandra Poggi, director of production of Alexandre Ishikawa, produced by Roberto Talma. Developed after three years of research with her sister, Xuxa no Mundo da Imaginação was geared towards a public from zero to ten years and was conceived with the help of educators and specialized professionals. Educationally, the children's program chose not to display cartoons, having pictures and musical numbers. This television show was also produced with a low budget, with timing and language different from the children's programs presented by Xuxa until then.

The scenarios of these pictures and musical numbers sought to convey the idea of the world idealized by children: castles, candy house, colorful flowers, mountains and clouds. There were present symbols of children's stories, with the intention that the child felt transported to the world of imagination. The program, about 40 minutes long, was divided into four blocks and had 32 frames displayed alternately throughout the week. Through computer graphics capabilities, Xuxa appeared seated on a Terrestrial Globe, with the blue background filled with white clouds, and featured 14 pictures that blended entertainment and didactic elements.

== Format ==
The longest of the paintings was Cantinho das Histórias (History Corner) up to ten minutes long, in which Xuxa told children stories with the help of puppets and / or invited actors. The framework Cantigas (Traditional Songs) was one of the highlights of the program. In it, well-known singers made re-readings of classics from brazilian songbook. Other segments were Encyclopedia, in which Xuxa showed and explained to children the meaning of terms, words and objects, and a classic repagined segment from Xou da Xuxa was Aquecendo (Gym), in which a dancer taught choreography. In addition to those already mentioned, other featured figures in the program were Apresentação (Presentation), in which Xuxa parodies popular songs with the help of a dog, and the Bruxa Keka (Witch Keka), where the character Keka, lived by Xuxa, a bad witch, looked for good educated children to transform in witches or monsters.

- Mixing pictures, music videos, storytelling for children in a fun and didactic way, the children also rescued wheel songs and playful and traditional games, such as hopscotch, apple run and bag run. Xuxa in the world of imagination had a small cast and few children on the stage. The program also counted on the participation of children from all over Brazil, who sent videos, letters, photos and drawings, exhibited by the program.
- On December 25, 2002, a Xuxa Christmas special was presented in the world of the imagination. Along with Father Marcelo Rossi, Xuxa spoke about the birthday of the Child Jesus, read letters written by children to God and narrated the birth of Jesus, which was interpreted by a group of children actors led by Debby Lagranha and Brunno Abrahão. The program was attended by the Intrepid Troupe, from the ballet dancer Dalal Achcar, who presented an adaptation of Tchaikovski's Nutcracker, and singer Vinny. Due to this extended program, another timeslot showing Sítio do Picapau Amarelo (2001) and TV Globinho (2000) were not broadcast that day.

=== Cartoons ===
- Bear in the Big Blue House
- Sitting Ducks
- Spider-Man: The New Animated Series
- Rolie Polie Olie
- SpongeBob SquarePants
- The Angry Beavers
- Rocko's Modern Life
- CatDog
- Cubix
- Blue's Clues

== Reformulations ==
In April 2003, the program began a new phase under the direction of Pedro Vasconcelos, Marcelo Zambelli and Mário Meirelles, with the latter's general direction, and with text by Tonio Carvalho, Claudio Lobato and Adriana Chevalier. Among the novelties was the radical Imagination, presented by the actor Cláudio Heinrich (a former Paquito), who showed sports such as skating, free flight, diving and mountaineering, as well as interviews with famous athletes. The goal was to reach boys between four and eight years of age who, according to a survey, did not identify much with the program and the presenter. Another novelty of the children was the Jornal Mundo da Imaginação (Mundo da Imaginação News), an educational newscast that had as anchors the Xuxinha and Guto dolls. The big change was the entry of cartoons, which until then were not displayed in the program.

In June 2003, Mário Meirelles left the general direction of the show. Pedro Vasconcelos, Teresa Lampréia and later Blad Meneghel (brother of Xuxa), took command of the attraction. The program continued to be produced by Roberto Talma.

In August 2004, the show suffered a repackage a new face, with the circus as its theme. Clowns, jugglers and magicians were the new characters who animated the children and starred in the pictures, music clips and a classical feature of the Xuxa television shows is added, the games.The children and their parents are now more next to Xuxa and the Paquitas turned back to the show. The stage was also reworked and the big attraction was a hat-shaped ball pool. In addition, the grandstand where the parents of the children were accommodated was transferred to the stage, getting more closer to the children and Xuxa.

Even with the reformulations, repackages and changes, Xuxa no Mundo da Imaginação failed to reach good ratings and left the programming grid of Rede Globo in December 2004. After the summer school vacations on following year, Xuxa returned to TV with a new show, TV Xuxa.

== Reception ==
The program debuted at an average of 15 points. During the first year, however, it was losing audience, being in second place, behind Bom Dia & Companhia, at the time hosted by Jackeline Petkovic, that reached to reach 17 points against 10 of Globo TV. In 2003 the program had already lost more than half of the audience, having an average of only 6 points. At this time also faced the RecordTV, that surpassed the infantile in several days, leaving the Xuxa no Mundo da Imaginação in third place. In 2004 - even with the reformulations and a decrease of the audience of Bom Dia & Companhia by the exit of Jackeline - the program could not react, registering the average of only 5 points.
