= Xuxa só para Baixinhos 2 =

Xuxa só Para Baixinhos 2

Studio album by Xuxa
- Released: September 5, 2001
- Recorded: 2001
- Genre: Children's music
- Length: 51:21
- Label: Som Livre
- Producer: Zé Henrique

Xuxa chronology
Xuxa só para Baixinhos 1 (2000)	Xuxa só Para Baixinhos 2 (2001)	Xuxa só para Baixinhos 3 (2002)

Singles from Xuxa só Para Baixinhos 2
- 1. "Dançando com o Txutxucão" Released: 2001; 2. "O Ônibus" Released: 2001; 3. "Vem Que eu Vou te Ensinar" Released: 2001

Xuxa só Para Baixinhos 2 (also known as XSPB 2) (transl. Only For Children Two) is the twenty-fourth studio album by Brazilian recording artist Xuxa, released on September 5, 2001, by Som Livre as the second album in the collection Só Para Baixinhos.

== Release and reception ==
Xuxa só Para Baixinhos 2, was released on September 5, 2001, first in the CD and VHS version and released on DVD shortly thereafter, it was reissued in VHS version in 2002, it was remastered and released on independent CD in 2008. The singles were "Dançando Com o Txutxucão", "O Ônibus" and "Vem Que eu Vou te Ensinar".

The album sold more than 50,000 copies in DVD, yielding double gold disc and 500,000 in CD yielding double platinum.

This disc reached the second position among the best sellers of 2001. With XSPB 2, Xuxa wins its first Latin Grammy Award for Best Latin Children's Album in 2002.

== Awards ==
=== Latin Grammy Awards ===
At the 3rd Annual Latin Grammy Awards in 2002, the album received one awards:

- Latin Grammy Award for Best Latin Children's Album

== Track listing ==
All lyrics translated by Vanessa Alves, unless otherwise noted.

Xuxa só para Baixinhos 2 – CD edition
No.	Title	Writer(s)	Length
1.	"Chefinho Mandou" (Simon Says)	Elliot Chiprut	2:21
2.	"Dois Peixinhos" (Three Little Fishies)	Josephine Carringer and Bernice Idins; Saxie Dowell	1:26
3.	"Vem Que eu Vou te Ensinar" (The Hokey Pokey)	Traditional; arranged by Cal Scott	2:35
4.	"O Ônibus" (The Wheels on The Bus)	Traditional; arranged by Matt Huesmann	1:29
5.	"Cinco Macaquinhos" (Five Little Joeys)	Traditional; arranged by The Wiggles (Murray Cook, Jeff Fatt, Anthony Field, and Greg Page)	1:41
6.	"Enquanto o Seu Lobo Não Vem" (Juguemos En El Bosque)	Oscar Fermin Banegas; Jose Martinez Fuste	1:45
7.	"Mexendo os Braços Com Teddy" (Move Your Arms Like Henry)	Paul Field	1:50
8.	"Dançando Com o Txutxucão" (We're Dancing With Wags The Dog)	The Wiggles (Murray Cook, Jeff Fatt, Anthony Field, and Greg Page)	1:23
9.	"Zoológico" (Zoo)	Joey Levine	1:34
10.	"Dez Degraus" (I Climb Ten Stairs)	The Wiggles (Murray Cook, Jeff Fatt, Anthony Field, and Greg Page)	1:10
11.	"Bate a Mão, Bate o Pé" (Clap)	Joey Levine	1:38
12.	"Laranjas e Bananas" (Apples and Bananas)	Traditional, arranged by Raffi and Ken Whiteley	1:40
13.	"Pot-Pourri: Misturando as Cores / Onde Estão As Cores? (Mix a Color / Colors All Around)"	Bob Singleton (version by Vanessa Alves and Zé Henrique) / Jim Rule (version by Vanessa Alves)	3:15
14.	"Imaginação" (Pretend)	Joey Levine	1:35
15.	"Esticar" (Stretch)	Joey Levine	1:31
16.	"Hum" (Hum)	Joey Levine	1:46
17.	"The Alphabet Song"	Traditional; arranged by Matt Huesmann (adapted by Xuxa)	0:53
18.	"Pot-Pourri Nacional: O Sapo Não Lava o Pé / Minhoca / O Coelhinho"	Brazilian traditional melody, adapted by Xuxa / Brazilian traditional melody, adapted by Xuxa / Duhilia Frazão Guimarães Madeira	2:39
19.	"A Bonequinha"	Traditional; adapted by Xuxa	2:29
20.	"Feche os Olhos" (Turn Around)	Hap Palmer	2:45
Total length:			37:34

Xuxa só para Baixinhos 2 – DVD and VHS edition
No.	Title	Writer(s)	Length
1.	"Introdução"		1:46
2.	"Chefinho Mandou" (Simon Says)	Elliot Chiprut	2:21
3.	"Passage (Numbers)"		0:20
4.	"Dez Degraus" (I Climb Ten Stairs)	The Wiggles (Murray Cook, Jeff Fatt, Anthony Field, and Greg Page)	1:10
5.	"Passage (Cachorro comendo Laranjas e Bananas)"		0:20
6.	"Laranjas e Bananas" (Apples and Bananas)	Traditional, arranged by Raffi and Ken Whiteley	1:40
7.	"Passage (Numbers)"		0:20
8.	"Vem Que eu Vou te Ensinar" (The Hokey Pokey)	Traditional; arranged by Cal Scott	2:35
9.	"Passage (Doce De Batata Doce in the style of Nordeste)"	Brazilian traditional poem, adapted by Xuxa	1:13
10.	"Enquanto o Seu Lobo Não Vem" (Juguemos En El Bosque)	Oscar Fermin Banegas; Jose Martinez Fuste	1:45
11.	"Passage (Numbers)"		0:20
12.	"Dois Peixinhos" (Three Little Fishies)	Josephine Carringer and Bernice Idins; Saxie Dowell	1:26
13.	"Passage (Cachorro Roqueiro)"		0:21
14.	"Dançando com o Txutxucão" (We're Dancing with Wags the Dog)	The Wiggles (Murray Cook, Jeff Fatt, Anthony Field, and Greg Page)	1:23
15.	"Passage (A Gata)"		0:41
16.	"Zoológico" (Zoo)	Joey Levine	1:34
17.	"Passage (Numbers)"		0:28
18.	"O Ônibus" (The Wheels on The Bus)	Traditional; arranged by Matt Huesmann	1:29
19.	"Passage (Cachorro Médico)"		0:10
20.	"Cinco Macaquinhos" (Five Little Joeys)	Traditional; arranged by The Wiggles (Murray Cook, Jeff Fatt, Anthony Field, and Greg Page)	1:41
21.	"Passage (O Seu Tatu Taí?)"		0:18
22.	"Mexendo os Braços Com Teddy" (Move Your Arms Like Henry)	Paul Field	1:50
23.	"Passage (Numbers)"		0:20
24.	"Pot-Pourri Nacional: O Sapo Não Lava o Pé / Minhoca / O Coelhinho"	Brazilian traditional melody, adapted by Xuxa / Brazilian traditional melody, adapted by Xuxa / Duhilia Frazão Guimarães Madeira	2:39
25.	"Passage (O Pinto e a Pinga)"	Traditional poem, adapted by Xuxa	0:27
26.	"Imaginação" (Pretend)	Joey Levine	1:35
27.	"Passage (Aniversário do Cachorro)"		0:20
28.	"Bate a Mão, Bate o Pé" (Clap)	Joey Levine	1:38
29.	"Passage (Lolipop)"		0:55
30.	"The Alphabet Song"	Traditional; arranged by Matt Huesmann (adapted by Xuxa)	1:06
31.	"Passage (Numbers)"		0:20
32.	"Pot-Pourri: Misturando as Cores / Onde Estão As Cores? (Mix a Color / Colors All Around)"	Bob Singleton (version by Vanessa Alves and Zé Henrique) / Jim Rule (version by Vanessa Alves)	3:15
33.	"Passage (Rei Cachorro: O Rato Roeu A Roupa Do Rei De Roma)"	Traditional poem, adapted by Xuxa	0:20
34.	"Esticar" (Stretch)	Joey Levine	1:31
35.	"Passage (Numbers)"		0:20
36.	"Hum" (Hum)	Joey Levine	1:46
37.	"Passage (Numbers)"		0:20
38.	"Feche os Olhos" (Turn Around)	Hap Palmer	2:45
39.	"A Bonequinha"	Traditional, adapted by Xuxa	2:29
40.	"Passage (Numbers)"		0:35
41.	"Credits" (Dançando Com o Txutxucão (instrumental))		1:32
42.	"Cinco Patinhos" (Five Little Ducks) (Bonus track)	Traditional; arranged by The Wiggles (Murray Cook, Jeff Fatt, Anthony Field, and Greg Page)	1:30
Total length:			51:21

== Personnel ==
- Art Direction: Xuxa Meneghel
- General direction: Marlene Mattos
- Production: Zé Henrique
- Production Director: Ângela Matos
- Production Assistant: Ana Paula Guimarães
- Verson of Music: Vanessa Alves
- Recorded in studios: Cinédia
- Direction: José Mario
- Director of Photography: Luiz Leal
- Choreographies: Fly
- Cast: Vanessa Alves (pink mouse), Alexandra Richter (yellow mouse), Marcelo Torreão (blue mouse)
- Costume designer: Marcelo Cavalcante
- Description: Vavá Torres/ Mário Campioli
- Hair And Makeup: Edson Freitas
- Scenography and Art Production: Lueli Antunes
- Technical Coordinator: Alfredo Campos
- Sonoplasty: Leonardo da Vinci
- Edition: Jorge Rui
- Production Assistant: Ana Paula Faria

== Certifications ==
Region	Certification	Certified units/sales
Brazil (Pro-Música Brasil) CD	2× Platinum	500,000^{*}
Brazil (Pro-Música Brasil) DVD	2× Gold	50,000^{*}
Brazil (Pro-Música Brasil)	3× Platinum	750,000^{‡}
^{*} Sales figures based on certification alone.^{‡} Sales+streaming figures based on certification alone.
