= Xou da Xuxa =

- Genre: Children; Game show Music; Talk show
- Directed by: Marlene Mattos
- Presented by: Xuxa Meneghel
- Starring: Ana Paula Almeida; Juliana Baroni; Roberta Cipriani; Marcelo Faustini; Flavia Fernandes; Letícia Spiller; Andréia Sorvetão; Bianca Rinaldi; Cátia Paganote; Tatiana Maranhão; Cláudio Heinrich; Ana Paula Guimarães
- Opening theme: Doce Mel (Bom Estar com Você)
- Ending theme: Doce Mel (Bom Estar com Você)
- Composer: Xuxa Meneghel
- Country of origin: Brazil
- Original language: Portuguese
- No. of seasons: 7
- No. of episodes: 2,000

Production
- Producer: Nilton Gouveia
- Production locations: Teatro Fênix, Rio de Janeiro
- Running time: 300 minutes (1986-1992); 180 minutes (1992)
- Production company: Xuxa Productions

Original release
- Network: Rede Globo
- Release: 30 June 1986 – 31 December 1992

Xou da Xuxa (English: Xuxa's Show) is a Brazilian children's television series directed by Marlene Mattos, and hosted by Xuxa Meneghel. It premiered on Rede Globo between 30 June 1986 and 31 December 1992, with 2000 editions completed. Xou replaced the Balão Mágico program. Later, it was repeated between January and February 1993, in the transition of the changes of programming of the transmitter. Then, Globo replaced the reprises of the Show by the reruns of the Mallandro Show, presented by Sérgio Mallandro. At the same time, the children's program Mundo da Lua on TV Cultura, was also on display. In the daily grid of TV Globo, the Xou of Xuxa was replaced by TV Colosso, while the presenter prepared its program displayed on Sundays.

Occupying mornings from Monday to Saturday, the program featured auditorium pictures (mostly competitions and musical numbers) interspersed with cartoons. In spite of the systematic negative reactions of the intellectuals and specialized critics, Xou da Xuxa soon became the most successful children's show in Brazilian television history, transforming its presenter into a phenomenon between the mid-1980s and the early 1990s. In 1993, she debuted an English version of her show in the US, but it was unpopular with American audiences and was cancelled after the first season.

== The program ==
Xou da Xuxa was directed by Marlene Mattos, with Nilton Gouveia as the production coordinator. The program went off the air on 31 December 1992.

The program's name, in Portuguese, is a play on the Portuguese word "sou", meaning "I am" and a Portuguese respelling of the English term "show" (Portuguese uses the letter "x" for the "sh" sound). This gives the name a double meaning, which can be understood as either: "I belong to Xuxa" or "Xuxa's Show."

The program showcased plays, musical acts, circus acts, cartoons and special sets. More than two hundred children were cast for every recording. Through host Xuxa, the show delivered messages about self-esteem, caring for the environment, and avoiding drug use.

Xuxa created characters who became show trademarks. Supporting cast members Andrea Veiga and Andrea Faria were two of the early "Paquitas", or stage assistants to Xuxa. The Paquitas were commonly dressed in clothes inspired by toy soldiers with white boots. Dengue (Roberto Bertin), who was portrayed as a huge mosquito with multiple limbs, and Praga (Armando Moraes), a turtle, contributed by livening the scene, helping the host and befriending the children.

The program quickly became popular. Xuxa referred to children as "baixinhos" (little ones), and came to be called "Rainha dos Baixinhos" ("Queen of the little people" or "Queen of Children"). Her phrase "beijinho, beijinho e tchau, tchau" ("little kiss, little kiss and bye, bye") also became popular. Many products were launched under the Xuxa brand, including dolls, accessories and clothing. The clothing range led to a fashion craze for wearing white leather boots, as "xuxinhas" became popular among children and adolescents.

== Impact ==
=== Ratings ===
Ratings in the Metropolitan Region of São Paulo according to IBOPE
Year	Ratings	Share
1986	27	
1989	35	
1990	28	
1991	29	
1992	26	
Rating average	23	

The success of "Xou da Xuxa" led to an effort to conquer international markets, with mixed results. The Argentina version of the program, El Show de Xuxa, was considered a success, reaching an estimated viewership of 33 million.

The United States version, Xuxa, was launched in English. Xuxa's difficulty with the English language and cultural issues were cited among reasons for it lasting only one season.

=== Critical reception ===
Since its early days, Xou da Xuxa suffered intense questioning by intellectuals, politicians and journalists, who conflated criticism of the program and the presenter.

An analysis offered by Riordan and Meehan of the reception of Xou da Xuxa, proposes differing cultural perceptions and attitudes toward the "sexiness" of the host, and her interactions with children on the show as one explanation for the show's failure to have cross-over success in the US. Similar reasoning is found in other readings, with claims that Xuxa's image, rather than the show itself, may have been a barrier toward the show. In a film entitled Amor Estranho Amor (1982), which translates to English as Love, Strange Love, by Brazilian director Walter Hugo Khouri, Xuxa plays a young prostitute who has a sexual encounter with an younger boy. Shaw and Dennison cite this film in suggesting, like Riordan and Meehan, that different cultural perceptions toward sexuality between North and South America may have influenced Xuxa's success.

Another reason offered was the differing programming lengths between the US and Brazil broadcasts. While the Brazilian version of the program aired for an hour per episode and was showcased for a full morning of airtime, only a 30-minute segment was selected for US television broadcast audiences, by television executives. This in turn, the theory reasons, prevented Xuxa from building a connection with her audiences who were already less familiar with her established Brazilian star persona.

A third rationale for the show's failure to take hold in North America is that Xuxa contradicted established perceptions in the US about Latin American women and beauty, because she is a light-skinned, blonde and blue-eyed Brazilian person. This fact of Xuxa's make-up, the rationale explains, presented a challenge toward Xou breaking into the US market. The common construct of Latin American ethnicity in the US runs counter to the concept of the existence of light-skinned, blonde and blue-eyed people being Latin American. While this construct represents a stereotype, it is offered as a reason for why other Latinas who fit the stereotype, such as Carmen Miranda, Rosie Perez or Jennifer Lopez have gained stardom in the US, while Xuxa did not. In essence, this line of reasoning argues that Xuxa was "too blonde" to be widely accepted in North America as a Latin American star.

=== Awards ===
- Troféu Imprensa - Best Children's Program (Won 1987–1993)

== See also ==
- Xuxa
- El Show de Xuxa
