= Planeta Xuxa =

Brazilian television series

- Genre: Game show Talk show Music
- Directed by: Marlene Mattos
- Starring: Xuxa Meneghel
- Opening theme: "Planeta Xuxa" (1997–2002); Giro do Planeta (2001–2002) "Conta Comigo" (2002)
- Country of origin: Brazil
- Original language: Portuguese
- No. of seasons: 7
- No. of episodes: 267

Production
- Production location: Projac
- Running time: 1h50 min

Original release
- Network: TV Globo (1997–2002)
- Release: 5 April 1997 – 28 July 2002

Related
- Xuxa Hits (1995); Xuxa no Mundo da Imaginação (2002–2004)

Planeta Xuxa (English: Xuxa's Planet) is a Brazilian television program directed by Marlene Mattos and hosted by Xuxa Meneghel. It was aired by TV Globo from 5 April 1997 to 28 July 2002. Aimed to the family and to its original audience that had now grown-up, it was initially broadcasting on Saturday afternoons. In April 1998, the show was moved to Sunday afternoons due to the transmissions of the 1998 FIFA World Cup, remaining in this timeslot until its final broadcast in 2002. Was the first Sunday evening program of auditorium hosted by a woman on Brazilian television. This slot, which is considered one of the noblest and most disputed on Brazilian television, was previously occupied by television programs presented exclusively by men as Silvio Santos, Fausto Silva and Gugu Liberato had shows on that time. Later, Carla Perez, Márcia Goldschmidt and Eliana followed the Xuxa footsteps and also appeared on Sunday afternoons on Brazilian TV. The program was an absolute success with audience ratings, often surpassing Domingão do Faustão.During the six years of its production, the program achieved frightening audience averages that, according to the measurement of the time, made by IBOPE, reached almost 1/4 of the televisions turned on in the country at that time. Often was common that the audience numbers surpassing Domingão do Faustão.

Planeta Xuxa was being fully reprised by Canal Viva, on Sundays at 7:00 p.m., and its re-re-run on Mondays at 9:00 p.m. The reprises started on 7 September 2014, leaving the channel among the 10 most watched on time, recording one of the best pay-TV audiences. After Xuxa signed a high-profile contract with Rede Record, Canal Viva ceased to show the program.

== Concept ==
Planeta Xuxa was focused on the musical performances from contemporary artists and bands. The program had the format of a discotech, had the participation of the public and welcomed famous guests. To animate the auditorium and keep the party mood in the studios, Xuxa had the help from the Paquitas, the Richard twins and the You Can Dance group, later the show won the help from the dancer Adriana Bombom and another groups of extras.

One of the most prominent segments was Intimidade (Intimacy), in which Xuxa interviewed guests by asking intimate, hard and indiscreet questions. In the premiere program, the interviewee was the actor Marcello Antony. Personalities such as actresses Letícia Sabatella and Arlete Salles, soccer players Ronaldo and Renato Gaúcho, singer Mark Knopfler, British band Dire Straits some of the public's legal doubts when he invited judge Siro Darlan to an interview. Also, Madonna was on the list of celebrities who spoke to the show in an interview in 1998. When it was a year in the air, in April 1998, the Planeta Xuxa won a beauty salon, where the Transformação (Make Over) segment was executed, immediately this segment turned a great success. Xuxa selected people from the audience presently or after a letter request, willing to give a reinvigorated look, from haircut to clothes. When a letter isn't chosen, during the start of the show record, the participants would raise their hands, euphoric, and wave to the hostess, asking them to be the chosen ones. In June of the same year, another block was implanted in the program: Viagem Surpresa do Planeta (Xuxa's Surprise Trip), in which the camera focused some participant in the audience that gained a trip of a week for some Brazilian tourist spot. The chosen person should have immediate availability to board.

== History ==
On April 19, 1998, the program changed day and time, and it will be shown on Sundays at noon. Still with the general direction of Marlene Mattos, was subordinated to the general direction of creation of Carlos Manga.

In July 1998, when the presenter entered on the maternity leave period, several local celebrities hosted the show: Ivete Sangalo; Alexandre Pires; Gabriel, o Pensador; Daniel; Zezé di Camargo & Luciano among others.

After the change of their members, a new group of Paquitas started to work on show. The team was formed by Monique Alfradique, Daiane Amendola, Lana Rodes, Thalita Ribeiro, Gabriela Ferreira, Leticia Barros, Joana Mineiro and Stephanie Gulin.

In April of the year 2000, the Planet Xuxa underwent new modifications. The Paquitas turned exclusive to Xuxa Park and the presenter started to have 15 new stage assistants, called Garotas do Zodiaco. The group consisted of Marcella Siede (Aries), Fabiana Telles (Aries), Marina Azze (Taurus), Daniele Nabor (Gemini), Ana Cecília Calderon (Gemini), Sabrina Miragaia (Cancer), Bianca Barbosa, Danah (Virgo), Gisella Prattes (Libra), Fernanda Fontoura (Scorpio), Francine Melo (Sagittarius), Nadja Haddad (Capricorn), Patrícia Marques (Capricorn), Lívia Paes (Aquarius), Fernanda de Freitas (Aquarius).

Planeta Xuxa also had one more member on his team: journalist Alex Lerner, who had been doing interviews with international music stars. The program also featured new segments this season, such as Correndo Atrás do Prejuízo (Running Behind Damage), which sought to secure extra cash for people with financial difficulties through tasks set by the program.

Also in April 2000, Marlene Mattos assumed the creative direction of all the Xuxa television shows, and happened to command entirely Planet Xuxa. At that time, the program had general direction of Marlene Mattos, writing of Vivian Perl, direction of production of Aluizio Augusto and management of production of Jayme Praça.

In 2001, Xuxa won other stage assistants: the "Manos" and the "Minas", a group of four boys and three girls with the task of further animating the audience. In that year, new paintings were inaugurated. In Giro do Planeta (Planet's is Spinning), Dudu Miranda, Alex Lerner and the former Paquita Andréa Veiga carried out national and international reports on various subjects. The redaction of the Planeta Newspaper was directed by the promoters David Brazil and Amin Khader, and talked about the world of celebrities; in the Endereço do Coração (My Heart Address), the presenter visited the house of famous friends - in the first edition, Xuxa went to Goiás state to visit the sertanejo singer Leonardo; and in Fogo na Roda (Fire on a Heat) segment, a special guest answered three types of questions - professional, intimate and indiscreet. These questions were made every week by a different group and on first edition, the group was composed by the actresses Mônica Carvalho, Paula Burlamaqui and Juliana Paes.

At the beginning of 2002, Planeta Xuxa presented Jogos de Verão (Summer Games), a special series of competitions that had the participation of special guests. The sporting event, which included running, climbing, jumping and crawling, among other specialties, were recorded at Marechal Hermes, Campo dos Afonsos, in the western area of Rio de Janeiro.

New segments have also been created. Next to the old and successful Intimacy, which received the actress Solange Couto in her re-screening in the new phase, were Entre Amigos (Between Friends) and Espertos do Planeta (Planet's Smarts). Planeta Xuxa also hosted two new members, the Scorpio (Rafael) and Ariano (Marcelo).

In June 2002, Xuxa and Marlene Mattos broke their partnership, (since the 80s, Mattos was her manager and director). At that time, a 5 year's girl mother, Xuxa wanted now to work exclusively again with children, as Mattos preferred the teens segments. The two have worked together for 18 years, since Xuxa's debut on the now-defunct TV Manchete in 1984. Mattos is the godmother of Sasha, the hostess' daughter. On July 28, 2002, the last Planeta Xuxa was taken on air. The presenter started to dedicate herself to the children's project in the Xuxa no Mundo da Imaginação, which debuted on TV Globo on 12 October 2002.

== Awards ==
Prêmio Extra de TV (1999)

- Variety Show (won)
