= Xuxa Park (Brazilian TV series) =

- Genre: Children; Game show Music; Talk show
- Based on: Xuxa Park, by Xuxa
- Directed by: Marlene Mattos
- Presented by: Xuxa Meneghel
- Starring: Xuxa; Paquitas; Roberta Richard; Mariana Richard; Armando Moraes; Paolo Pacelli; Reinaldo Weismann; Marisa Leal
- Country of origin: Brazil
- Original language: Portuguese
- No. of seasons: 8

Production
- Executive producer: Xuxa
- Production locations: Teatro Fênix (1994–1999); Estúdios Globo (1999–2001)
- Running time: 2 to 4 hours

Original release
- Network: TV Globo
- Release: 4 June 1994 – 6 January 2001

Related
- Programa Xuxa (1993); Xuxa Hits (1995); Xuxa Park

Xuxa Park is a Brazilian children's television series hosted by pop star Xuxa Meneghel, commonly known as Xuxa, which aired on Globo from 4 June 1994 to 6 January 2001. The program, a reboot of a Spanish program of the same name broadcast in the early 1990s, was shown on Saturday mornings and aimed at a family audience. The program featured many elements from the previous version, such as games, cartoons, and musical numbers.

Xuxa Park was canceled following an incident on 11 January 2001, in which a short circuit caused a massive fire that destroyed the set near the conclusion of that day's taping. While several people were treated for smoke inhalation, no fatalities were reported.

== History ==
=== Background ===
Xuxa Park was hosted by Brazilian pop star Xuxa Meneghel, who in the 1980s and 1990s was very popular in Latin America and Spain. The program was shot on a set that resembled an amusement park, the centerpiece of which was a spaceship from which Xuxa emerged at the start of each episode and reembarked at the conclusion. Normally, the program consisted of seven or eight segments showcasing games, musical numbers, interviews, correspondence reading, and other topics.

=== Production ===
During its first five seasons, Xuxa Park was recorded in Teatro Fênix, a neighborhood of Jardim Botânico, Rio de Janeiro. Called Crystal Palace, the set housed a modern amusement park full of lights, tunnels, spacecraft, and toys that turned in all directions. Xuxa had a lift-shaped flying saucer. In the 1995 season, the scenario was modified. The Crystal Palace, however, continued to be the main reference.

In September 1999, the last three seasons of Xuxa Park commenced. The stage and all elements were redesigned. The program began to be recorded in Projac, in a bigger area than the theater space, and the whole studio space was used, leaving only lateral access. The scene had again a futuristic style, and its design was based on a new millennium.

==== Flash fire and cancellation ====
On 11 January 2001, an electrical fire occurred during the filming of an episode's outro sequence, igniting the set starting with Xuxa's spaceship. This fire injured four: two children and the two men who rescued them. The program was put on hiatus and ultimately canceled due to the incident, with eight unaired episodes recorded prior never airing out of respect to the children traumatized by the fire.

=== Format ===
Xuxa Park consisted of mixed games, musical numbers, and cartoons, divided into up to eight blocks depending on the content. The duration varied over the years from two to four hours. In January 1995, Xuxa Park began to share Saturday mornings with the children's TV Colosso (1993), airing from 10:45. In April 1995, the time had been changed to 9:50 a.m.; and in July 1996, the program was being transmitted from 8 a.m.

The opening block, Xuxa Park, was dedicated to cartoons. The second and third blocks were dedicated to games. In the first two seasons, competitions were between schools in the city of Rio de Janeiro. The 1996 season is the only one where boys and girls competed. In the end of the third block, the Pequenas Crianças, Grandes Talentos, showed children from all over the Brazil, dancing or showing some skill. it always had variations in its formatting, but it always ended with the talk show Canta, Brasil, in which Xuxa interviewed a Brazilian idol each week. The fifth block was dedicated again to final tests ending the games sequence. In the sixth and seventh blocks, the program had the Xuxa Hits, Music charts with the singers and the songs played most often throughout the season. These blocks would later become Planeta Xuxa.

=== Cast ===
In the same way as the previous programs, the cast included Paquitas and the twins Roberta and Mariana Richard, the Irmãs Metralha; and the actor Armando Moraes who played the Praga character, a male turtle that irritated the presenter gained a new character, an elf that guarded the abandoned mine where the amusement park was hidden during the first seasons. He resurrected Praga during the 1996 season when the presenter celebrated her 10 years on Rede Globo. However, in the following season, he did not appear. Another character that reappeared from the presenter's old programs was the doll "Moderninho" manipulated by Reinaldo Weismann, who helped the presenter in reading the audience's letters and acted during the 1997 season when the presenter was pregnant as her personal assistant and came back later interacting with the public and helping the presenter at times. In the two last seasons Weismann acted along with the actress Marisa Leal to give life to the siblings Xuxinha and Guto. A specific character created for the show was Gênio Eugênio (Paolo Pacelli), who also later disappeared. In the final seasons, Xuxa even gained the support of dancer Adriana Bombom, who was moved from Planeta Xuxa to Xuxa Park to help the Paquitas after some members had left the group. Along all the eight seasons, Xuxa gained support from some former Paquitas members, as Andreia Sorvetão and Andreia Faria recorded some specific external segments of the program, such as visits to museums, musical events, theater performances, or municipal parks. Sometimes they acted as backstage correspondents of the show itself and the Agendinha (Calendar) block in which the cultural events of the week in question were announced.

== Bibliography ==
- Dicionário da TV Globo (Vol. 1 - Dramaturgia e Entretenimento) - Categoria Entretenimento: page. 748 / Jorge Zahar Editora, Rio de Janeiro.
