= List of best-selling Latin albums =

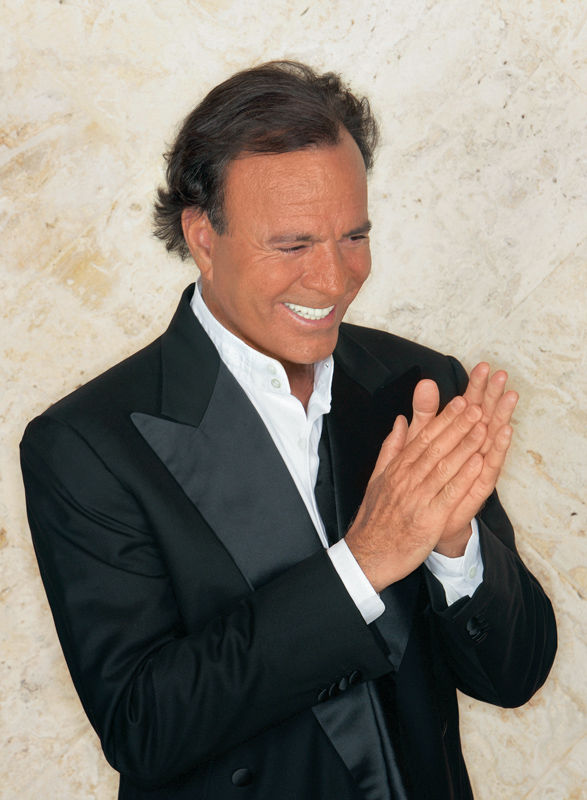
Momentos by Julio Iglesias is the highest-selling Latin album of all-time on the list.

Latin music has an ambiguous meaning in the music industry due to differing definitions of the term "Latin". For example, the Latin music market in the United States defines Latin music as any release that is mostly sung in Spanish, regardless of genre or artist nationality, by industry organizations including the Recording Industry Association of America (RIAA) and Billboard. International organizations and trade groups such as the Latin Recording Academy include Portuguese-language music in the Latin category.

Music journalists and musicologists define Latin music as musical styles from Spanish-speaking areas of Latin America and from Spain. Music from Brazil is usually included in the genre, and music from Portugal is occasionally included.

As a result of the conflicting views of defining Latin music, the list includes Latin albums defined either by language for vocal albums or genre for instrumental albums. Therefore, for an album to appear on the list, the figure must have been published by a reliable source, the album must have sold at least 2 million copies with at least 600,000 certified units (the equivalent of a Latin diamond certification by the RIAA), and it must either a) have at least 51% of its content in Spanish or Portuguese (Note: This is the same metric Billboard, the RIAA, and the Latin Recording Academy uses to categorize an album as "Latin".) or b) is abeatin instrumental album (or any of its subgenres). This information cannot be listed officially, as there is no organization that has recorded global Latin music sales. This list can contain any types of album, including studio albums, extended plays, greatest hits, compilations, various artists, soundtracks and remixes. The figures given do not take into account the resale of used albums. For albums recorded in multiple languages, only the Spanish/Portuguese version(s) will be counted towards the certified sales.

Certified copies are sourced either from available online databases of local music industry associations or a country with an established certifying authority (see List of music recording certifications). Online certifications in Latin America are not extensive and only date back to a certain time period. For example, the Asociación Mexicana de Productores de Fonogramas y Videogramas (AMPROFON), the certifying authority in Mexico, only has certifications dating back to 1999 on its online database. Certifications from countries without online databases may be used if it has a certifying authority. In the case of sales of Latin albums in the US, primarily those released before the 1990s, certifications were awarded by the artists own record label rather than the RIAA with a lower threshold, a practice that was widely criticized by Latin label executives due to sales not being audited by an outside party. In a 1989 article for Billboard, Carlos Agudelo cited the insularity of the Latin music market in the US for the lack of reliable sales numbers reported to the RIAA. Therefore, only certifications listed on the RIAA database may be used for US certifications.

With estimated sales of 12 million copies worldwide, Spanish singer Julio Iglesias's Momentos (1982) is the highest-selling Latin album on the list. Mexican singer Luis Miguel currently has the highest number of albums on the list with 14, while Colombian songstress Shakira has the most by a female artist with four.

== Legend ==
Colors
| Studio albums |
| Greatest hits and compilations |
| Live albums |

== Best-selling Latin albums ==
*All sales figures are shown in millions

| Artist | Album | Released | Genre | Language(s) | Total certified copies (from available markets)* | Reported sales* | Ref(s) |
|---|---|---|---|---|---|---|---|
| Julio Iglesias | Momentos | 1982 | Latin pop | Spanish; Portuguese; French; English | 4.83: US (Latin): 200,000; JPN: 600,000; UK: 100,000; BRA: 2 million; SPA: 600,000; MEX: 500,000; ARG: 420,000; DEN: 80,000; FIN: 60,436; COL: 60,000; CAN: 50,000; NLD: 50,000; SWE: 50,000; AUT: 25,000; POR: 20,000; CHI: 15,000 | 12 | |
| Luis Miguel | Romance | 1991 | Bolero | Spanish | 4.604: US: 1 million; BRA: 100,000; MEX: 2 million; SPA: 200,000; ARG: 960,000; VEN: 100,000; COL: 60,000; CHI: 100,000; PER: 60,000; URU: 24,000 | 8 | |
| Buena Vista Social Club | Buena Vista Social Club | 1997 | Cuban | Spanish | 3.22: US: 1 million; JPN: 100,000; UK: 300,000; GER: 750,000; FRA: 100,000; CAN: 100,000; AUS: 70,000; BRA: 100,000; NLD: 200,000; SWE 40,000; BEL: 150,000; ARG: 60,000; SWI: 150,000; AUT: 100,000 | 8 | |
| Shakira | Dónde Están los Ladrones? | 1998 | Pop; Rock en Español | Spanish | 4.075: MEX: 1,450,000; US: 1 million; COL: 840,000; CHI: 280,000; ARG: 240,000; SPA: 100,000; TUR: 90,000; VEN: 60,000; URU: 12,000; PER: 3,000 | 7 | |
| Alejandro Sanz | Más | 1997 | Flamenco pop | Spanish | 4.312: US (Latin): 600,000; BRA: 100,000; CHI: 80,000; COL: 120,000; ECU: 30,000; PAR: 30,000; PER: 30,000; SPA: 2.2 million; MEX: 750,000; ARG: 300,000; URU: 12,000; VEN: 60,000 | 6 | |
| Ricky Martin | Vuelve | 1998 | Latin dance; Pop ballads | Spanish | 2.721: US: 1 million; FRA: 100,000; CAN: 200,000; AUS: 140,000; MEX: 200,000; SWE: 80,000; SPA: 600,000; ARG: 180,000; NOR: 25,000; POL: 50,000; SWI: 50,000; FIN: 10,000; URU: 6,000 | 6 | |
| Gloria Estefan | Mi Tierra | 1993 | Cuban | Spanish | 3.595: US (Latin): 1.6 million; NLD: 100,000; SPA: 1 million; MEX: 750,000; ARG: 120,000; SWI: 25,000 | 5.2 | |
| Selena | Dreaming of You | 1995 | American pop; Latin music | Spanish • English | 3.69: US (Latin): 3.54 million; CAN: 50,000; MEX: 100,000 | 5 | |
| Maná | ¿Dónde Jugarán los Niños? | 1992 | Latin pop/rock | Spanish | 3.42: US (Latin): 1.2 million; SPA: 100,000; MEX: 2 million; ARG: 120,000 | 5 | |
| Shakira | Fijación Oral, Vol. 1 | 2005 | Latin pop | Spanish | 2.665: US (Latin): 1.1 million; GER: 300,000; FRA: 100,000; SPA: 300,000; MEX: 300,000; ARG: 120,000; BEL: 25,000; SWI: 40,000; AUT: 30,000; GRE: 10,000; HUN: 10,000; POR: 10,000; RUS: 20,000 | 5 | |
| Juan Luis Guerra | Bachata Rosa | 1990 | Bachata; Merengue; Salsa | Spanish | 1.55: US (Latin): 100,000; SPA: 700,000; MEX: 600,000; BRA: 100,000; NLD: 50,000 | 5 | |
| Luis Miguel | Romances | 1997 | Bolero | Spanish | 4.465: US: 1 million; BRA: 100,000; MEX: 1.2 million; SPA: 900,000; ARG: 660,000; COL: 120,000; VEN: 120,000; CHI: 200,000; CEN: 100,000; PAR: 20,000; BOL: 20,000; ECU: 15,000; PER: 10,000 | 4.5 | |
| Luis Miguel | Segundo Romance | 1994 | Bolero | Spanish | 3.753: US: 1 million; BRA: 100,000; MEX: 1.25 million; SPA: 200,000; ARG: 660,000; COL: 120,000; VEN: 200,000; CHI: 165,000; PER: 40,000; URU: 18,000 | 4.5 | |
| Santana | Abraxas | 1970 | Latin rock | Instrumental; English; Spanish | 5.7: US: 5 million; UK: 100,000; FRA: 300,000; CAN: 300,000 | 4 | |
| Enrique Iglesias | Enrique Iglesias | 1995 | Pop; Power ballads | Spanish | 2.6: US: 1 million; SPA: 400,000; MEX: 1 million; ARG: 60,000; BRA: 100,000; POR: 40,000 | 4 | |
| Julio Iglesias | Tango | 1996 | Tango | Spanish | 2.185: US (Latin): 600,000; UK: 60,000; FRA: 300,000; CAN: 50,000; AUS: 70,000; NLD: 100,000; ITA: 100,000; SPA: 600,000; SWE: 40,000; SWI: 25,000; ARG: 240,000 | 4 | |
| Shakira | Sale el Sol | 2010 | Latin pop; merengue; rock; world | Spanish; English | 2.13: US (Latin): 600,000; GER: 200,000; FRA: 500,000; BRA: 160,000; ITA: 120,000; SPA: 120,000; SWE: 60,000; SWI: 60,000; MEX: 210,000; BEL: 30,000; AUT: 20,000; POL: 40,000; RUS: 10,000 | 4 | |
| Shakira | Pies Descalzos | 1995 | Pop rock; Latin rock | Spanish | 2.09: US: 1 million; BRA: 250,000; SPA: 100,000; MEX: 500,000; ARG: 240,000 | 4 | |
| Juanes | Mi Sangre | 2004 | Latin rock | Spanish | 2.076: US (Latin): 1.2 million; GER: 300,000; NLD: 40,000; SWE 30,000; SWI: 40,000; MEX: 200,000; ARG: 80,000; BEL: 100,000; AUT: 15,000; FIN: 51,811; GRE: 10,000; HUN: 10,000 | 4 | |
| Charlie Zaa | Sentimientos | 1996 | Bolero | Spanish | 1.85: US: 1 million; MEX: 850,000 | 4 | |
| Kaoma | Worldbeat | 1989 | Lambada | Portuguese; Spanish; English | 1.375: US: 500,000; JPN: 200,000; FRA: 200,000; CAN: 50,000; BRA: 250,000; NLD: 50,000; SPA: 100,000; SWI: 25,000 | 4 | |
| Julio Iglesias | Hey! | 1980 | Latin ballad | Spanish | 1.05: US : 500,000; NLD: 50,000; SPA: 500,000 | 4 | |
| Carlos Vives | Clásicos de la Provincia | 1993 | Vallenato | Spanish | 0.62: US (Latin): 30,000; MEX: 200,000; SPA: 300,000; CHI: 50,000; COL: 40,000 | 4 | |
| Luis Miguel | Amarte es un Placer | 1999 | Pop | Spanish | 2.35: US: 500,000; SPA: 700,000; MEX: 750,000; ARG: 300,000; CHI: 100,000 | 3.5 | |
| Maná | Sueños Liquidos | 1997 | Latin pop/rock | Spanish | 2.32: US: 1 million; MEX: 1.2 million; ARG: 120,000 | 3.5 | |
| Xuxa | Xou da Xuxa 3 | 1988 | Pop, Children's music | Portuguese | 3: BRA: 3 million | 3.2 | |
| Marcelo Rossi | Músicas para Louvar ao Senhor | 1997 | Christian | Portuguese | 3: BRA: 3 million | 3.3 | |
| Maná | MTV Unplugged | 1999 | Pop rock | Spanish | 2.22: US: 500,000; SPA: 400,000; MEX: 900,000; ARG: 420,000 | 3 | |
| Paulina Rubio | Paulina | 2000 | Latin pop; Dance-club; Ballads | Spanish | 1.842: US (Latin): 800,000; ARG: 30,000; CHI: 20,000; ECU: 7,500; PER: 5,000; SPA: 300,000; MEX: 600,000; VEN: 50,000 | 3 | |
| Ricky Martin | A Medio Vivir | 1995 | Latin | Spanish | 1.804: US: 500,000; FRA: 300,000; SWE: 60,000; SWI: 25,000; MEX: 500,000; ARG: 360,000; BEL: 30,000; FIN: 29,363 | 3 | |
| Luis Miguel | Aries | 1993 | Dance-pop; Ballads | Spanish | 1.678: MEX: 1 million; SPA: 100,000; ARG: 500,000; COL: 60,000; URU: 18,000 | 3 | |
| Manu Chao | Próxima Estación: Esperanza | 2001 | Latin | Arabic; English; French; Galician; Portuguese; Spanish; various | 1.675: US (Latin): 100,000; UK: 60,000; FRA: 900,000; CAN: 50,000; NLD: 40,000; ITA: 100,000; SPA: 200,000; SWI: 120,000; ARG: 40,000; BEL: 50,000; GRE: 15,000 | 3 | |
| Luis Miguel | Busca una Mujer | 1988 | Latin pop | Spanish | 1.34: MEX: 1 million; ARG: 240,000; SPA: 100,000 | 3 | |
| Enrique Iglesias | Vivir | 1997 | Latin pop; Dance-pop; Adult ballads | Spanish | 2.25: US: 1 million; MEX: 1 million; BRA: 50,000; SPA: 200,000 | 3 | |
| Luis Miguel | Nada Es Igual... | 1996 | Pop; R&B | Spanish | 1.245: US: 500,000; SPA: 200,000; ARG: 420,000; CHI: 125,000 | 3 | |
| Julio Iglesias | Libra | 1985 | Adult contemporary; Latin Pop | Spanish; English; Portuguese | 0.7: US (Latin): 600,000; SPA: 100,000 | 3 | |
| Julio Iglesias | Un hombre solo | 1987 | Latin pop | Spanish | 0.64: SPA: 400,000; ARG: 240,000 | 3 | |
| Xuxa | 4º Xou da Xuxa | 1989 | Pop, Children's music | Portuguese | 2: BRA: 2 million | 2.9 | |
| Só Pra Contrariar | Só Pra Contrariar | 1997 | Samba; MPB | Portuguese | 3: BRA: 3 million | 2.9 | |
| Sandy & Junior | As Quatro Estações | 1999 | teen pop | Portuguese | 2: BRA: 2 million | 2.8 | |
| Sandy & Junior | Quatro Estações: O Show | 2000 | teen pop | Portuguese | 1: BRA: 1 million | 2.7 | |
| Xuxa | Xegundo Xou da Xuxa | 1987 | Pop, Children's music | Portuguese | 2: BRA: 2 million | 2.7 | |
| Xuxa | Xou da Xuxa | 1987 | Pop, Children's music | Portuguese | 2: BRA: 2 million | 2.6 | |
| Leandro e Leonardo | Um Sonhador | 1998 | Musica sertaneja | Portuguese | 1: BRA: 1 million | 2.7 | |
| Las Ketchup | Hijas del Tomate | 2002 | Latin Pop; Rumba flamenca | Spanish | 0.955: US (Latin): 400,000; FRA: 100,000; SPA: 100,000; SWE: 30,000; SWI: 20,000; MEX: 150,000; FIN: 60,000; POR: 80,000; GRE: 15,000 | 2.6 | |
| Selena | Amor Prohibido | 1994 | Tejano cumbia | Spanish | 2.76: US (Latin): 2.46 million; MEX: 300,000 | 2.5 | |
| Linda Ronstadt | Canciones de Mi Padre | 1987 | Mariachi | Spanish | 2: US: 2 million | 2.5 | |
| Chayanne | Atado a Tu Amor | 1998 | Soft rock; Dance | Spanish | 1.874: US: 500,000; CHI: 80,000; SPA: 700,000; MEX: 250,000; ARG: 300,000; URU: 24,000 | 2.5 | |
| Luis Miguel | Mis Romances | 2001 | Bolero | Spanish | 1.43: US (Latin): 400,000; BRA: 50,000; SPA: 300,000; MEX: 600,000; ARG: 80,000 | 2.5 | |
| Alejandro Sanz | 3 | 1995 | Latin pop | Spanish | 1.08: SPA: 800,000; MEX: 100,000; ARG: 180,000 | 2.5 | |
| Enrique Iglesias | Quizás | 2002 | Latin pop | Spanish | 0.62: SPA: 100,000; US: 500,0000; ARG: 20,000 | 2.5 | |
| Mamonas Assassinas | Mamonas Assassinas | 1995 | Comedy rock | Portuguese | 1: BRA: 1 million | 2.46 | |
| Terra Samba | Terra Samba ao Vivo e a Cores | 1998 | Samba; Pagode | Portuguese | 2: BRA: 2 million | 2.45 | |
| Alejandro Sanz | El Alma al Aire | 2000 | Latin pop | Spanish | 2.055: US (Latin): 200,000; SPA: 1.3 million; MEX: 375,000; ARG: 180,000 | 2.4 | |
| Gloria Estefan | Abriendo Puertas | 1995 | Salsa; Merengue; Bolero; Afro-Cuban | Spanish | 1.31: US (Latin): 600,000; NLD: 50,000; SPA: 600,000; ARG: 60,000 | 2.3 | |
| Alejandro Fernández | Me Estoy Enamorando | 1997 | Bolero; Ranchera; pop | Spanish | 1.86: US: 1 million; MEX: 750,000; SPA: 50,000; ARG: 60,000 | 2.2 | |
| Mecano | Descanso Dominical | 1988 | Synth-pop | Spanish | 1.125: SPA: 1.1 million; SWI: 25,000 | 2.2 | |
| Christina Aguilera | Mi Reflejo | 2000 | Latin pop; world; R&B | Spanish | 1.06: US (Latin): 600,000; SPA: 100,000; MEX: 300,000; ARG: 60,000 | 2.2 | |
| Maná | Amar es Combatir | 2006 | Rock en español | Spanish | 1.145: US: 500,000; BRA: 30,000; SPA: 240,000; SWI: 15,000; MEX: 200,000; ARG: 160,000 | 2.1 | |
| Marco Antonio Solís | Trozos de Mi Alma | 1999 | Latin pop | Spanish | 2.06: US: 1 million; MEX: 1 million; ARG: 60,000 | 2 | |
| Gipsy Kings | Gipsy Kings | 1987 | Pop music-Flamenco | Spanish | 1.885: US: 1 million; JPN: 100,000; UK: 100,000; FRA: 300,000; CAN: 200,000; AUS: 140,000; SWI: 25,000; POR: 20,000 | 2 | |
| David Bisbal | Corazón latino | 2002 | Latin pop; Romantic ballad | Spanish | 1.7: US (Latin): 100,000; SPA: 1.3 million; MEX: 300,000 | 2 | |
| Bad Bunny | YHLQMDLG | 2020 | Latin trap • reggaeton • alternative reggaetonpop • hip-hop • R&B | Spanish | 1.585: US (Latin): 1.44 million; SPA: 120,000; ITA: 25,000 | 2 | |
| Julio Iglesias | La Carretera | 1995 | Latin pop | Spanish | 1.51: FRA: 100,000; BRA: 200,000; SPA: 600,000; MEX: 100,000; ARG: 360,000; NLD: 50,000; CHI: 50,000; COL: 30,000; POR: 20,000 | 2 | |
| Luis Miguel | 20 Años | 1990 | Ballads | Spanish | 1.5: MEX: 1 million; SPA: 200,000; ARG: 300,000 | 2 | |
| La Oreja de Van Gogh | El viaje de Copperpot | 2000 | Pop | Spanish | 1.5: US (Latin): 100,000; SPA: 1.1 million; MEX: 300,000 | 2 | |
| Ottmar Liebert | Nouveau Flamenco | 1990 | Nouveau flamenco | Instrumental | 1.5: US (Latin): 1.4 million; CAN: 100,000 | 2 | |
| Elvis Crespo | Suavemente | 1998 | Merengue | Spanish | 1.482: US: 1 million; MEX: 350,000; ARG: 120,000; URU: 12,000 | 2 | |
| Luis Miguel | Soy Como Quiero Ser | 1987 | Latin pop | Spanish | 1.48: MEX: 1.25 million; SPA: 50,000; ARG: 180,000 | 2 | |
| Luis Miguel | México en la Piel | 2004 | Mariachi | Spanish | 1.46: US (Latin): 400,000; SPA: 100,000; MEX: 800,000; ARG: 80,000; COL: 20,000; VEN: 40,000; CHI: 20,000 | 2 | |
| Laura Pausini | Laura Pausini | 1994 | Pop | Spanish | 1.425: SPA: 1.1 million; ARG: 240,000; COL: 60,000; CHI: 25,000 | 2 | |
| Ricardo Arjona | Historias | 1994 | Ballads | Spanish | 1.39: US: 400,000 (Latin); MEX: 750,000; ARG: 240,000 | 2 | |
| Rosana Arbelo | Lunas Rotas | 1996 | Rumba flamenca; Bossa nova | Spanish | 1.34: SPA: 1.1 million; ARG: 240,000 | 2 | |
| Luis Miguel | El Concierto | 1995 | Pop; Bolero; Ranchera | Spanish | 1.29: US: 500,000; MEX: 500,000; SPA: 50,000; ARG: 240,000 | 2 | |
| Ricky Martin | MTV Unplugged | 2006 | Pop | Spanish | 1.27: US (Latin): 200,000; MEX: 950,000; ARG: 80,000; SPA: 40,000 | 2 | |
| Juanes | Un Dia Normal | 2002 | Latin Rock | Spanish | 1.285: US (Latin): 600,000; SPA: 200,000; MEX: 225,000; ARG: 40,000; POR: 20,000 | 2 | |
| Tribalistas | Tribalistas | 2002 | Brazilian | Portuguese | 1.25: BRA: 1 million; SPA: 50,000; ARG: 40,000; POR: 160,000 | 2 | |
| Alejandro Sanz | No Es lo Mismo | 2003 | Pop ballads | Spanish | 1.22: US (Latin): 100,000; SPA: 800,000; MEX: 200,000; ARG: 120,000 | 2 | |
| RBD | Rebelde | 2004 | teen pop | Spanish | 1.2: US (Latin): 400,000; SPA: 200,000; MEX: 550,000; BRA: 50,000 | 2 | |
| Luis Miguel | Vivo | 2000 | Pop; Bolero; Ranchera | Spanish | 1.145: US (Latin): 200,000; SPA: 300,000; MEX: 525,000; ARG: 120,000 | 2 | |
| Daddy Yankee | Barrio Fino | 2004 | Reggaeton | Spanish | 1.14: US: 1 million; MEX: 100,000; ARG: 40,000 | 2 | |
| Alejandro Sanz | Viviendo Deprisa | 1991 | Latin pop | Spanish | 1.13: SPA: 900,000; MEX: 200,000; ARG: 30,000 | 2 | |
| Marco Antonio Solís | Más de Mi Alma | 2001 | Latin folk; Pop | Spanish | 1.12: US: 500,000; SPA: 20,000; MEX: 300,000; ARG: 300,000 | 2 | |
| Mónica Naranjo | Palabra De Mujer | 1997 | Pop ballads; Dance music | Spanish | 1.1: US (Latin): 100,000; SPA: 1 million | 2 | |
| Julio Iglesias | Calor | 1992 | Adult Contemporary; Latin Pop | Spanish; Portuguese | 1.025: BRA: 250,000; ITA: 50,000; SPA: 500,000; ARG: 120,000; COL: 30,000; NLD: 50,000; CHI: 25,000 | 2 | |
| Daniela Mercury | O Canto da Cidade | 1992 | Axé | Portuguese | 1: BRA: 1 million | 2 | |
| Thalía | Arrasando | 2000 | Dance music | Spanish | 0.983: US (Latin): 200,000; CHI: 15,000; COL: 15,000; GRE: 15,000; PER: 10,000; PHI: 40,000; SLO: 15,000; SPA: 400,000; MEX: 150,000; ARG: 60,000; URU: 3,000; VEN: 100,000 | 2 | |
| Luis Miguel | 33 | 2003 | Pop | Spanish | 0.98: US (Latin): 200,000; SPA: 200,000; MEX: 500,000; ARG: 80,000 | 2 | |
| Miguel Bosé | Papito | 2007 | Latin pop | Spanish | 0.92: US (Latin): 100,000; SPA: 400,000; MEX: 400,000; ARG: 20,000 | 2 | |
| Enrique Iglesias | Cosas del Amor | 1998 | Power ballads | Spanish | 0.762: US: 500,000; MEX: 250,000; URU: 12,000 | 2 | |
| Thalía | En éxtasis | 1995 | Pop music | Spanish | 0.678: US (Latin): 200,000; ARG: 120,000; BRA: 100,000; CHI: 15,000; MEX: 200,000; PHI: 40,000; URU: 3,000 | 2 | |
| Thalía | Amor a la mexicana | 1997 | Latin dance; Pop music | Spanish | 0.675: US (Latin): 200,000; CHI: 15,000; PHI: 40,000; SPA: 200,000; MEX: 100,000; ARG: 120,000 | 2 | |
| Ricky Martin | Almas del Silencio | 2003 | Flamenco; Vallenato; Latin ballad | Spanish | 0.615: US (Latin): 400,000; SPA: 100,000; MEX: 75,000; ARG: 40,000 | 2 | |

== See also ==
- List of best-selling albums in Argentina
- List of best-selling albums in Brazil
- List of best-selling albums in Chile
- List of best-selling albums in Colombia
- List of best-selling albums in Mexico
- List of best-selling albums in Spain
- List of best-selling Latin albums in the United States
- List of best-selling Latin music artists
- List of best-selling Latin singles
- List of best-selling Latin singles in the United States
