= De niña a mujer =

De Niña a Mujer

Studio album by Julio Iglesias
- Released: 1981
- Genre: Latin pop
- Length: 35:43
- Languages: Spanish; Portuguese; French
- Label: Columbia
- Producer: Ramón Arcusa

Julio Iglesias chronology
Hey! (1980)	De Niña a Mujer (1981)	Zartlichkeiten (1981)

De Niña a Mujer (English: From a Child to a Woman) is a 1981 album by Julio Iglesias. The album was his first Spanish-language album to be released in the United States by Columbia Records to capitalize on the singer's rising popularity. The American version was retitled "From a Child to a Woman" and released simultaneously with the original Discos CBS version. The album, as its title implies, was dedicated to his daughter Chabeli, who is featured on the album's cover alongside her father.

== Track listing ==
All tracks produced by Ramón Arcusa.

Professional ratings
Review scores
Source	Rating
AllMusic	4.5/5 stars

De Niña a Mujer — Spanish edition
No.	Title	Writer(s)	Length
1.	"De Niña a Mujer"	J. Iglesias; C. Enterria; T. Renis; R. Arcusa	3:18
2.	"Volver a Empezar (Begin the Beguine)"	Cole Porter; Iglesias (Spanish version)	4:42
3.	"Después de Ti"	Iglesias; M. de la Calva; Arcusa	3:45
4.	"Que Nadie Sepa Mi Sufrir"	E. Diezo; A. Cabral	3:22
5.	"Isla en el Sol (Island in the Sun)"	H. Belafonte; Lord Burgess; Iglesias	3:20
6.	"O Me Quieres o Me Dejas (Devaneos)"	Luis Gardey	3:34
7.	"Y Pensar..."	D. Ramos; Iglesias	3:25
8.	"Si, Madame"	Iglesias; G. Belfiore; Arcusa; D. Fariña; E. Picciotta	3:00
9.	"Grande, Grande, Grande"	A. Testa; Renis; Iglesias	3:47
10.	"Como Tú"	P. Trim; Iglesias; de la Calva; Arcusa	3:30
Total length:			35:43

De Niña a Mujer — Brazilian edition
No.	Title	Writer(s)	Portuguese lyrics	Length
1.	"Devaneios (Ou me queres ou me deixas)"	Gardey	Erasmo Carlos	3:40
2.	"Volver a Empezar (Begin the Beguine)"	Porter; Iglesias (Spanish version)		4:42
3.	"Después de Ti"	Iglesias; de la Calva; Arcusa		3:39
4.	"Que Nadie Sepa Mi Sufrir"	Diezo; Cabral		3:22
5.	"Manuela"	M. Alejandro; A. Magdalena	Antonio de Lima	3:29
6.	"De Niña a Mujer"	Iglesias; Enterria; Renis; Arcusa		3:18
7.	"Y Pensar..."	Ramos; Iglesias		3:23
8.	"Um dia ri, o outro chora (No soy de aquí)"	F. Cabral	Carlos Lyra	3:39
9.	"Grande, Grande, Grande"	Testa; Renis; Iglesias		3:48
10.	"Isla en el Sol (Island in the sun)"	Belafonte; Burgess; Iglesias		3:19
Total length:				36:19

Fidèle — French edition
No.	Title	Writer(s)	French lyrics	Length
1.	"Viens M'embrasser (Abrázame)"	Iglesias; R. Ferro	M. Jourdan	3:30
2.	"Une Chanson Qui Revient (Begin The Beguine)"	Porter; Iglesias (Spanish version)	Jourdan	4:40
3.	"Les Dérobades (O Me Quieres o Me Dejas)"	Gardey	C. Lemesle	3:34
4.	"L'amour Au Grand Soleil (Island in the Sun)"	Belafonte; Burgess	P. Carrel	3:19
5.	"C'est Toi Ma Chanson (De Niña a Mujer)"	Iglesias; Enterria; Renis; Arcusa	Lemesle	3:15
6.	"Mon Pauvre Cœur (Después de Ti)"	Iglesias; de la Calva; Arcusa	Jourdan	3:39
7.	"L'amour Est Fou, Madame (Si, Madame)"	Iglesias; Belfiore; Arcusa; Fariña; Picciotta	Carrel	3:00
8.	"Tu Danses, Danses, Danses (Grande, Grande, Grande)"	Testa; Renis	Lemesle	3:31
9.	"Un Jour Tu Ris, Un Jour Tu Pleures (No Soy De Aqui)"	Cabral	Lemesle	3:40
10.	"Fidèle (Amantes)"	Belfiore; Iglesias; M. Balducci; Arcusa	J. Mercury	3:00
Total length:				35:08

== Charts ==
=== Weekly charts ===
Weekly chart performance for De Niña a Mujer
Chart (1981–84)	Peak position
Argentine Albums (CAPIF)	2
Belgian Albums (HUMO)	2
Dutch Albums (Album Top 100)	7
French Albums Chart (SNEP)	1
Japanese Albums (LPs) (Oricon)	11
Japanese Albums (Cassettes) (Oricon)	10
Norwegian Albums (VG-lista)	5
Spanish Albums (AFYVE)	1
Swedish Albums (Sverigetopplistan)	26
UK Albums (Official Charts)	43
US Billboard 200	181

=== Year-end charts ===
Year-end chart performance for De Niña a Mujer
Chart (1981)	Position
Dutch Albums (Album Top 100)	67
French Albums Chart (SNEP)	19
Spanish Albums (AFYVE)	3

Chart (1982)	Position
Brazilian Albums (Nopem)	7
Japanese Albums (Oricon)	24

Chart (1983)	Position
Japanese Albums (Oricon)	39

== Certifications and sales ==
Region	Certification	Certified units/sales
Argentina (CAPIF)	3× Platinum	180,000^{^}
Brazil (Pro-Música Brasil)	14× Platinum	3,500,000^{*}
Chile	Gold	
China	—	1,200,000
Colombia	2× Platinum	120,000
Denmark (IFPI Danmark)	Gold	50,000^{^}
France (SNEP) for Fidèle	2× Platinum	750,000
Japan (RIAJ)	Platinum	501,390
Mexico (AMPROFON)	2× Platinum	500,000^{^}
Netherlands (NVPI)	Gold	50,000^{^}
Spain (Promusicae)	7× Platinum	700,000^{^}
Sweden (GLF)	Gold	50,000^{^}
^{*} Sales figures based on certification alone.^{^} Shipments figures based on certification alone.

== See also ==
- List of best-selling albums in Brazil
