= Xou da Xuxa (album) =

Studio album by Xuxa
- Released: 6 August 1986
- Recorded: 1986
- Genres: Pop; Children's music
- Length: 35:25
- Language: Portuguese
- Label: Som Livre
- Producers: Guto Graça Mello; Michael Sullivan; Paulo Massadas

Xuxa chronology
Xuxa e Seus Amigos (1985)	Xou da Xuxa (1986)	Xegundo Xou da Xuxa (1987)

Singles from Xou da Xuxa
- 1. "Doce Mel (Bom Estar Com Você)" Released: 1986; 2. "She-Ra" Released: 1986; 3. "Turma Da Xuxa" Released: 1986; 4. "Amiguinha Xuxa" Released: 1986

Xou da Xuxa (English: Xuxa's Show) is the second studio album by Brazilian recording artist Xuxa. It was released on 6 August 1986 by Som Livre, alongside her television show on Globo. With over 2.7 million copies sold, the LP became the best-selling album in Brazil and South America.

== Background ==
At age 23, the model and presenter of Rio Grande do Sul Maria das Graças Meneghel was hired by Globo - who paid a fortune to get her out of the Manchete, where she presented the Clube das Crianças (Children's Club) since 1983 - to present the Xou da Xuxa, of the morning program won the title of "Queen of the Baixinhos" and the leadership in the audience in the mornings of the Brazilian TV, with an average of 7 million spectators daily. His musical career had begun in 1984 with the album Clube da Criança.

== Recording ==
With the success of the program, Globo Network, decided to continue investing in the musical career of Xuxa, who had begun a year earlier with the release of their first studio album Xuxa e Seus Amigos (1985). Guto Graça Melo was contracted to produce the disc. When Guto met Xuxa, he realized she could not sing a single note. Not knowing what to do, Guto appealed to the president of Som Livre João Araújo, who said "Figure it out. Make up an album to do with her."

As Xuxa did not know how to sing, she was constantly annoyed in the studio for not being a singer. Xuxa to help during the recording, Guto called a girl who did backing vocals for him, Nina, and produced like Xuxa character with the mannerisms that Guto would like her to do. After recording with Nina, Xuxa spent days and days listening to recordings on her headset trying to imitate the singer. Guto revealed that since there were no equipment to tune the voice at the time, Xuxa sang on several channels and he reduced to one of the best moments. Xuxa recorded each song "hundreds of times" until arriving at the ideal voice.

During the process of selecting songs for the album, Guto revealed that no composer wanted to give music to Xuxa. Guto revealed that he wanted to "put composers who were not exactly for children." "Quem Qué Pão" was composed by Aretuza, then a press officer for the label. She created the song as a joke for her children to eat. The proposal of Som Livre was that the album had lyrics for children with arrangements made by national rock musicians, this explains the presence of Rita Lee compositions, Roberto Frejat, Guto Goffi and the participation of Evandro Mesquita and Patricia Marx (at that time still a member of Trem da Alegria) in the album.

== Released ==
First album in the record company Som Livre, the Xou da Xuxa, arrived at the stores in the first week of August 1986 in the formats of LP and tape cassette. The album was released on CD for the first time in 1996, with two bonus tracks "Parabéns da Xuxa" (Congratulations from Xuxa) and "Papai Noel Dos Baixinhos" (Santa Claus from Baixinhos), which were originally released on the Xuxa Karaoke LP. The CD was reissued in 1996 and 2006.

The "Garoto Problema" (Trouble Boy) version present in Xou da Xuxa re-releases is different from the version in the original disc run. In this version, the intonation in the voice of Xuxa and the conversation between the presenter and Evandro Mesquita are different.

In 2013, Som Livre in partnership with Xuxa Productions, launched the Xuxa Collection of Xuxa, a box with all 7 discs released at the time of the program, and with it a CD with unpublished songs, chosen by the fans of the presenter.

== Commercial performance ==
The album sold about 100,000 copies in the first week, thus being certified as a gold record. It sold 250 thousand copies in the second week and thus the number of copies was increasing every week. When reaching the mark 2.5 million copies sold, João Araújo, president of Som Livre, had to stop making records saying "Or we make a record to sell or a [premium] record." Producer Guto replied: "Invent a diamond disk, make a platinum-like album, slip a little diamond and give it to your artist." The sales were a record for the time, overcoming the sales of pop phenomenons like RPM and Roberto Carlos, the King of Brazilian music. The album accumulated the mark of 2,689,000 copies sold. The song "Doce Mel (Bom Estar com Você)" was positioned as the 4th most played song in Brazilian radio in the year 1986.

Even after three decades of its release, the songs on the album are pretty much performed in the 2010s. Congrats to Xuxa is one of the most played songs at parties, according to Ecad's survey (Central Office of Collection and Distribution). which controls the collection and distribution of copyright.

== Promotion ==
As the songs served as the theme of Xuxa's Xouga program, basically the entire album was performed and performed in the attraction. Outside of the morning, two tracks of the album won music videos in the Fantástico (Fantastic): "Doce Mel" and "Turma da Xuxa". There are rumors that Xuxa would have participated in the program Cassino do Chacrinha (Chacrinha's Casino) singing one of the songs on the album, but to this day, no record has yet come to prove it.

On August 9, 1986, the same week of the album's release, Xuxa held a show at Playcenter São Paulo to promote the album. From this presentation, there were other invitations to concerts, thus forming the Xou da Xuxa tour. The only show that has video records so far, is the Santa Claus Arrival in Maracanã, Rio de Janeiro, held on November 29, 1986.

== Legacy ==
Xuxa's first Xou da Xuxa series title, as well as his songs, his language with children was of great significance for Brazilian pop culture and for the country's music market. Still in the first months of contract with Rede Globo the Veja magazine published a long story in 1986 talking about the success of Xuxa and calling for the first time presenter of "Children's Queen". For the magazine the success of the presenter was due "especially because it was innovative, creative and had some peculiarities, such as the language in first person, that made the children feel an air of proximity, as if she were talking to each one of them." For Guto Graça Mello who co-produced the album, "the success of the album and the presenter is a result of Xuxa's empathy with the children's audience and a void that was in a segment that consumes its products with an impressive voracity to this day." The portal Buzzfeed quoted that Xuxa taught great lessons to children who accompanied her at that time in Brazil. A critic of Forum magazine, she highlighted the contribution of the album to the Brazilian music industry and its impact even after thirty years of launch. "Nearing her 30th birthday, Xuxa's first album, as a presenter of "Xou" at Rede Globo, reveals when her career as a singer (even without a dowry to be), emerged in the musical scene with the sound of the time, beating records of sales with Roberto Carlos and the RPM, revealing to be the star of the record Som livre. A real phenomenon." He also attributed the success of the formats of vinyl and cassette in Brazil to the high repercussion of the album "Xou" of 1986 sold about 2 million and a half copies, with cross plan facilitating the purchase of the product in vinyl and cassette, at a time when phonographic piracy was not such a harmful reality." He even put the track "Doce Mel" as one of "the most memorable songs from the album's repertoire." defining the introduction of the song as "shocking" and reminiscent of songs like "The Final Countdown" by Swedish band Europe or "Jump" by American band Van Halen, "for the rocky outline of the track, surrounded by synthesizers with guitar solos performed by Robson Jorge.

Xuxa became a Brazilian pop culture icon immediately after his second release of his recording career. The singer was called "A pop product that worked," By the second the critic of the site, the presenter is a clear and pure example of Brazilian pop culture. "Among polemics and commotions the blonde has become a symbol of reference for Brazilians of all ages and in various segments." After the release of the album and its high sales Xuxa would be recognized around the world as the "Children's Queen" for being the child singer with highest selling of world history. The site Terra compared the singer to American singer Elvis Presley and Michael Jackson saying that just as "Elvis Presley earned the nickname of rock king because it was the most successful artist of the style in the years that followed the emergence of the genre; Michael Jackson, for having influenced a whole generation of pop artists, creating a new reality for music videos and reaching unthinkable levels of sales of live albums and shows." Likewise Xuxa "was dubbed the "Queen of the Little Ones." In all the ways in which the blonde with easy smile and blue eyes got involved, the result was the same: as a model, she became a record holder of magazine covers in Brazil; on the big screen, created a new and unprecedented standard for children's programs; in music, is still among the Brazilian artists with the highest number of albums sold; in the movies, the result repeats itself." The album was considered responsible for other children's presenters to launch as singers of the genre. The album cover also became quite popular in Brazilian culture, becoming extremely popular, On July 11, 2011 appeared on Tumblr the page "Xuxa is all around!", which compiles photos of fans imitating the iconic pose of Xuxa on the cover of the album, inviting the public of the site to send his photo redoing the pose. The site quickly reached national fame, turning news in several portals. It is one of the most successful albums of Xuxa in her singing career to date, with sales boosted by more than 2 million copies, being the eighth best selling album of the history of Brazil, where Xuxa emplaced three other titles of the same series, and also one of the best selling albums by a solo artist for children around the world. The result of the success of the album made Xuxa become responsible for the creation of the diamond certificate in Brazil.

== Track listing ==
Side A –Standard edition
No.	Title	Writer(s)	Length
1.	"Doce Mel (Bom Estar com Você)"	Claudio Rabello; Renato Corrêa	3:14
2.	"Turma da Xuxa"	Reinaldo Waisman; Robson Stipancovich	2:59
3.	"Peter Pan"	Rita Lee; Roberto de Carvalho	3:38
4.	"Garoto Problema" (featuring Evandro Mesquita)	Frejat; Guto Goffi	4:03
5.	"Meu Cãozinho Xuxo"	Rogério Enoé Messias Corrêa	4:09
Total length:			18:03

Side B –Standard edition
No.	Title	Writer(s)	Length
1.	"She-Ra"	Joel; Tavinho Paes	5:05
2.	"Amiguinha Xuxa"	Rogério Enoé Messias Corrêa	3:03
3.	"Meu Cavalo Frankstein"	Mário Lúcio de Freitas; Tati	2:40
4.	"Quem Qué Pão"	Tuza; J. Corrêa	1:56
5.	"Miragem Viagem (Black Orchid)" (Sung by the singer Patricia Marx, of Trem da Alegria)	Steve Wonder; Ronaldo Bastos (version in Portuguese)	4:37
Total length:			17:21

Xou da Xuxa – CD re-release
No.	Title	Writer(s)	Length
1.	"Parabéns da Xuxa"	Michael Sullivan; Paulo Massadas	2:33
2.	"Doce Mel (Bom Estar com Você)"	Claudio Rabello; Renato Corrêa	3:13
3.	"Turma da Xuxa"	Reinaldo Waisman; Robson Stipancovich	2:58
4.	"Peter Pan"	Rita Lee; Roberto de Carvalho	3:37
5.	"Garoto Problema" (featuring Evandro Mesquita)	Frejat; Guto Goffi	4:02
6.	"Meu Cãozinho Xuxo"	Rogério Enoé Messias Corrêa	4:08
7.	"She-Ra"	Joel; Tavinho Paes	5:04
8.	"Amiguinha Xuxa"	Rogério Enoé Messias Corrêa	3:02
9.	"Meu Cavalo Frankstein"	Mário Lúcio de Freitas; Tati	2:39
10.	"Quem Qué Pão"	Tuza e J. Corrêa	1:54
11.	"Miragem Viagem (Black Orchid)" (Sung by the singer Patricia Marx, of Trem da Alegria)	Steve Wonder; Ronaldo Bastos (Portuguese version)	4:36
12.	"Papai Noel dos Baixinhos"	Irany de Oliveira; Xuxa	3:40
Total length:			35:25

== Personnel ==
- Guto Graça Mello – producer (except for "Parabéns da Xuxa" and "Papai Noel dos Baixinhos")
- Michael Sullivan – producer (except for "Parabéns da Xuxa" and "Papai Noel dos Baixinhos")
- Paulo Massadas – producer (on the "Parabéns da Xuxa" and "Papai Noel dos Baixinhos")
- Jorge 'Gordo' Guimarães – recording engineer, mixing engineer (except in the "Miragem Viagem"), recording and mixing technician (in the "Parabéns da Xuxa" and "Papai Noel dos Baixinhos")
- Luiz G. D' Orey – recording engineer, mixing engineer (in the bands "Miragem Viagem" and "Meu Cãozinho Xuxo"), recording technician (on the "Parabéns da Xuxa" and "Papai Noel dos Baixinhos")
- Edu Brito – recording technician (on the "Parabéns da Xuxa" and "Papai Noel dos Baixinhos")
- Ronconi – recording technician (on the "Parabéns da Xuxa" and "Papai Noel dos Baixinhos")
- Jackson Paulino – assistant recordist
- Marcelo Serodio – assistant recordist
- Beto Vaz – assistant recordist
- Cezar – assistant recordist
- Sérgio Ricardo – assistant recordist
- Billy – assistant recordist
- Julinho – assistant recordist
- Juninho – assistant recordist
- Marquinhos – assistant recordist
- Jorginho Corrêa – regimentation
- Ieddo Gouvêa – Assembly
- Sérgio Rocha – production assistant
- Marco Aurélio – production assistant
- Marcos Caminha – production assistant
- Marcelo Seódio – production assistant
- Julio Carneiro – production assistant
- Ivan Carvalho – production assistant
- Chambinha – production assistant
- José Martins – production assistant
- Reinaldo Waisman – cover creation, illustrations
- Joseph Kieny – photographer
- James Radá – ¨photographer

== Certifications ==
Region	Certification	Certified units/sales
Brazil (Pro-Música Brasil)	2× Diamond	2,000,000^{‡}
^{‡} Sales+streaming figures based on certification alone.

== See also ==
- List of best-selling albums in Brazil
- List of best-selling Latin albums
