= Xegundo Xou da Xuxa =

Studio album by Xuxa
- Released: June 23, 1987
- Recorded: 1987
- Genres: Pop; Children's music
- Length: 58:38
- Label: Som Livre
- Producers: Max Pierre; Michael Sullivan; Paulo Massadas

Xuxa chronology
Xou da Xuxa (1986)	Xegundo Xou da Xuxa (1987)	Xou da Xuxa 3 (1988)

Singles from Xegundo Xou da Xuxa
- 1. "Festa do Estica e Puxa" Released: 1987; 2. "O Circo" Released: 1987; 3. "Rexeita da Xuxa" Released: 1987; 4. "Croc Croc" Released: 1987

Xegundo Xou da Xuxa (English: Second Xuxa's Show) is the third studio album by Brazilian recording artist Xuxa Meneghel, released on June 23, 1987 by Som Livre. The album sold over 3.2 million copies. It is one of the most popular albums of Xuxa's career, surpassing sales in the previous album Xou da Xuxa (1986).

== Production ==
For this album, Xuxa received about 900 songs from various composers. Of this large amount, between 15 and 20 songs were recorded and 13 were released, not counting with the participation of Patricia Marx in the disc. The singer even commented that the choice of repertoire was very difficult, since she liked the majority. The disc was recorded in only 20 days.

Feast of the Estica and Puxa, composed by the band Chiclete com Banana, was presented to Xuxa after the singer, Bel Marques then promised to compose a song for the presenter.

Xegundo Xou da Xuxa was produced by Michael Sullivan and Paulo Massadas, with artistic coordination Max Pierre.

== Release and reception ==
Xegundo Xou da Xuxa and was released on 23 June 1987 by Som Livre, in cassette and LP formats. The album was re-released in CD format for the first time in 1995, in 1996 it was re-released on CD and K7 and in 2006 it was released on CD. In 2013, Som Livre in partnership with Xuxa Productions, launched Xou's collection of Xuxa + Untitled CD Fans Selection, a box with all 7 discs released at the time of the program, and with it a CD with unpublished songs, chosen by fans of the presenter.

The album managed to overcome previous album sales, and brought a certain innovation in the songs and especially in Xuxa voice has improved considerably in terms of the songs from her first album Xou da Xuxa (1986). Xegundo Xou da Xuxa has become one of the 10 best selling albums in Brazil and to date it is the third with 3,200,000 copies sold, and the third best seller of Xuxa's career, being certified diamond by Associação Brasileira de Produtores de Discos (ABPD).

The album yielded four singles: "Festa do Estica e Puxa", "O Circo", "Rexeita da Xuxa" and "Croc Croc". The song "Hey Mickey" is a re-recording of the homonymous success sung in English by Toni Basil; "Parabéns da Xuxa" would have entered this album, but was discarded and ended up being included as unpublished in the Karaokê da Xuxa, being included later in the re-release in CD of 1995.

== Promotion ==
Almost the entire album was performed on Xuxa's Xuxa program, but only a few songs were performed by the blonde, more precisely the single from the album. The singer even promoted the album in the program Os Trapalhões.

In addition to broadcasting on radio and TV, Xuxa toured the album that began on August 27, 1987, in São Paulo and ended in December of the same year.

== Track listing ==
Side one
No.	Title	Writer(s)	Length
1.	"Festa do Estica e Puxa"	Bell Marques	4:12
2.	"Hey Mickey (Hey Mickey)"	Xuxa (portuguese version)	3:29
3.	"Feliz"	Eduardo Souto Neto; Nelson Wellington	3:55
4.	"O Circo"	Paulo César Barros; Prêntice; Monteiro De Souza	3:16
5.	"Banda Da Xuxa"	Reinaldo Waisman; Robson Stipancovich	3:26
6.	"Croc Croc"	Rubens Alexandre	3:13
7.	"Campeão"	Conceição Azevedo; César Rossini; Lucas Robles	3:40
Total length:			25:11

Side two
No.	Title	Writer(s)	Length
1.	"Rambo"	Michael Sullivan; Paulo Massadas	4:14
2.	"Quem Quiser Que Conte Outra"	Fábio Luiz; Luiz Fernando	3:11
3.	"Aquecendo (Ginástica)"	Michael Sullivan; Paulo Massadas	3:18
4.	"Comigo Ninguém Pode" (Sung by Patricia Marx)	Patricia Marx	3:14
5.	"Dodói Neném"	Fred Goes; Guilherme Maia	3:38
6.	"Rexeita da Xuxa"	Arnaldo; Mônica Freitas	3:11
7.	"Nós Somos O Amanhã" (Special participation of: Gabriela, Trem da Alegria, Os Abelhudos, Tatiana)	Michael Sullivan; Paulo Massadas	4:35
Total length:			25:21

Xegundo Xou da Xuxa – CD re-release
No.	Title	Writer(s)	Length
1.	"Estrela-Guia (Natal)"	Michael Sullivan; Paulo Massadas	5:37
2.	"Festa do Estica e Puxa"	Bell Marques; Wadinho Marques	4:12
3.	"Hey Mickey (Hey Mickey)"	Xuxa (portuguese version)	3:29
4.	"Feliz"	Eduardo Souto Neto; Nelson Wellington	3:55
5.	"O Circo"	Paulo C.ésar Barros Prêntice; Monteiro De Souza	3:16
6.	"Beijinho, Beijinho"	Kiko Zambianchi; Xuxa	2:26
7.	"Banda Da Xuxa"	Reinaldo Waisman; Robson Stipancovich	3:26
8.	"Croc Croc"	Rubens Alexandre	3:13
9.	"Campeão"	Conceição Azevedo; César Rossini; Lucas Robles	3:40
10.	"Rambo"	Michael Sullivan; Paulo Massadas	4:14
11.	"Quem Quiser Que Conte Outra"	Fábio Luiz; Luiz Fernando	3:11
12.	"Aquecendo (Ginástica)"	Michael Sullivan; Paulo Massadas	3:18
13.	"Comigo Ninguém Pode" (Sung by Patricia Marx)	Patricia Marx	3:14
14.	"Dodói Neném"	Fred Goes; Guilherme Maia	3:38
15.	"Rexeita da Xuxa"	Arnaldo; Mônica Freitas	3:11
16.	"Nós Somos O Amanhã" (Special participation of: Gabriela, Trem da Alegria, Os Abelhudos, Tatiana)	Michael Sullivan; Paulo Massadas	4:35
Total length:			58:38

== Personnel ==
- Produced: Max Pierre, Michael Sullivan and Paulo Massadas
- Artistic Coordination: Marlene Mattos and Xuxa Meneghel
- Recording Technician: Jorge 'Gordo' Guimarães (bases and keyboards), Luiz G. D 'Orey
- Studio Assistants and Mixing: Cezar Barbosa, Ivan Carvalho, Roberta Rodrigues, * Julio Carneiro, Claudio Oliveira and Sergio Rocha
- Mixing: Jorge 'Gordo' Guimarães
- Photos: Paulo Rocha
- Arrangement: Jorge 'Jorginho' Corrêa
- Illustration (insert): Reinaldo Waisman
- Edition of tape: Jorge 'Gordo' Guimarães
- Costume Designer: Sandra Bandeira
- Recorded in the studios: Som Livre (Rio de Janeiro)
- Hair: Márcia Elias
- Musician: Roberto Fernandes

== Certifications ==
Region	Certification	Certified units/sales
Brazil (Pro-Música Brasil)	2× Diamond	2,000,000^{‡}
^{‡} Sales+streaming figures based on certification alone.

== See also ==
- List of best-selling albums in Brazil
- List of best-selling Latin albums
