= Patricia Marx =

Patricia Marx may refer to:

- Patricia Marx (humorist), American humorist and writer
- Patricia Marx (singer) (born 1974), Brazilian singer-songwriter
