= Begin the Beguine (album) =

Studio album by Julio Iglesias
- Released: 1981
- Length: 60:24
- Label: CBS

Julio Iglesias chronology
Zartlichkeiten (1981)	Begin the Beguine (1981)	Momentos (1982)

Singles from Begin the Beguine
- 1. "Quiéreme mucho (Love Me a Lot)" Released: 1981

Professional ratings
Review scores
Source	Rating
AllMusic	3.5/5 stars

Begin the Beguine is a studio album by Julio Iglesias, released in 1981 on CBS.

== Track listing ==
No.	Title	Writer(s)	Length
1.	"Begin the Beguine" (Volver a empezar)	Cole Porter	4:44
2.	"Quiéreme" (based on the Polovtsian dances from Prince Igor)		2:46
3.	"Me olvidé de vivir" (I Forgot How to Live)	Pierre Billon / Julio Iglesias / Jacques Revaux	4:52
4.	"Por un poco de tu amor" (For a Little of Your Love)	Oscar Gomez / Albert Hammond	2:58
5.	"Grande, grande, grande" (Never, Never, Never)	Julio Iglesias / Tony Renis / Alberto Testa	3:49
6.	"Como tú" (Someone like You)	Ramón Arcusa / Manuel de la Calva / Julio Iglesias / Phil Trim	3:31
7.	"Guantanamera"	Héctor Angulo / Joseíto Fernandez / José Martí / Pete Seeger	3:46
8.	"Quiéreme mucho" (Love Me a Lot)	Gonzalo Roig / Jack Sherr	4:15
9.	"Hey"	Ramón Arcusa / Mario Balducci / Giovanni Belfiore / Julio Iglesias	5:00
10.	"Un día tú, un día yo" (One Day You...One Day Me)	Ramón Arcusa / Manuel de la Calva / Julio Iglesias	3:02
11.	"Soy un truhán, soy un señor" (I'm a Rogue, I'm a Gentleman)	Ramón Arcusa / Manuel de la Calva / Julio Iglesias	3:06
12.	"Candilejas" (Limelight)	Charlie Chaplin / Geoffrey Parsons	4:13
13.	"El amor" (La Tendresse)	Thomas Ferrière / Rafael Ferro / Julio Iglesias	2:50
14.	"33 aňos" (33 Years)	Julio Iglesias	3:49
15.	"Isla en el sol"	Harry Belafonte / Lord Burgess / Julio Iglesias	3:21
16.	"Pregúntale" (Ask Him)	Ramón Arcusa	4:55
Total length:			60:24

== Charts ==
Chart (1982)	Peak position
New Zealand Albums (RMNZ)	24

== Certifications ==
Region	Certification	Certified units/sales
Australia (ARIA)	Gold	35,000^{^}
United Kingdom (BPI)	Gold	100,000^{^}
^{^} Shipments figures based on certification alone.
