= List of number-one albums of 1981 (Spain) =

The List of number-one albums of 1981 in Spain is derived from the Top 100 España record chart published weekly by PROMUSICAE (Productores de Música de España), a non-profit organization composed by Spain and multinational record companies. This association tracks record sales (physical and digital) in Spain.

== Albums ==
No.	Artist	Album	Reached number one	Weeks at number one
1	Julio Iglesias	De niña a mujer	6 June 1981	12
2	Joan Manuel Serrat	En tránsito	10 August 1981	8
3	Orquesta Mondragón	Bon Voyage	25 May 1981	6
4	Barbra Streisand	Guilty	5 January 1981	4
5	Adamo	Aquellas manos en tu cintura	7 December 1981	4
6	John Lennon & Yoko Ono	Double Fantasy	9 February 1981	3
7	Juan Pardo	Juan mucho más Juan	9 March 1981	3
8	Nat King Cole	Inolvidable	6 April 1981	3
9	Dúo Dinámico	20 éxitos de oro	19 January 1981	3
10	José Luis Perales	Nido de águilas	11 May 1981	2
11	Electric Light Orchestra	Time	23 November 1981	2
12	Joan Manuel Serrat	Album de oro	27 April 1981	2

== See also ==
- List of number-one singles of 1981 (Spain)
