= Three Bon Bunnies =

The Three Bon Bunnies were one of the first African-American vocal performing girl trios. In 1945 the singers performed in the "Swing Session" All Negro USO Camp Shows. The singers went on to travel to Japan with one of the first "all-negro entertaining shows", to perform for the troops after World War II. The lead singer was Wilhelmina Barnett who won first prize singing at the Apollo Theater in New York with her rendition of Begin the Beguine. She also sang for Eleanor Roosevelt and on the New York City radio station WMCA.
