= Músicas para Louvar ao Senhor =

Live album by Marcelo Rossi
- Released: September 1998
- Recorded: July 18–19, 1998
- Length: 49:47
- Label: PolyGram; Mercury
- Producer: Newton D'Ávila

Músicas para Louvar ao Senhor (translated Songs to Praise the Lord) is an album by the Brazilian Catholic priest, Padre Marcelo Rossi. Father Rossi's first live album, it was recorded on July 18 and 19, 1998, during masses held at the Santuário Terço Bizantino in São Paulo. It was released in September 1998 by Polygram do Brazil. With more than 3.3 million copies sold, it is the best-selling album in history in Brazil.

== Track listing ==
1. Quero Mergulhar Nas Profundezas (Timbó) [3:16]
2. Corsa (Benedito Carlos) [3:39]
3. Espírito (Julio Figueiró Jr.) [5:03]
4. Basta Querer (Jorge Guedes) [5:08]
5. Senhor, Põe Teus Anjos Aqui (arranged and adapted by Pe. Marcelo Rossi) [2:39]
6. Mãe, Mãe, Mãe (Célio Peres Esteves) [4:37]
7. Reunidos Aqui (arranged and adapted by Pe. Marcelo Rossi) [1:03]
8. Anjos De Deus (Eliseu Gomes) 4:57
9. Quem É Esta Que Avança Como A Aurora (Domingos S. Oliveira) [2:54]
10. Palmas Para Jesus (arranged and adapted by Pe. Marcelo Rossi) [2:08)
11. "A Alegria (Aeróbica do Senhor)" (arranged and adapted by Pe. Marcelo Rossi) [4:05]
12. "Pot-pourri - Festinha Para Jesus" (arranged and adapted by Pe. Marcelo Rossi) [5:23]
13. "Erguei As Mãos" / "Senhor Tem Muitos Filhos" (arranged and adapted by Pe. Marcelo Rossi) [4:50]

== See also ==
- List of best-selling albums in Brazil
- List of best-selling Latin albums
