= Hey! (Julio Iglesias album) =

Studio album by Julio Iglesias
- Released: 1980
- Genre: Pop Latino
- Label: Columbia

Julio Iglesias chronology
Amanti (Julio Iglesias album) (1980)	Hey! (1980)	Zartlichkeiten (1981)

Hey! is an album by Julio Iglesias. It was released in 1980 by Columbia Records. In 1981, Iglesias was nominated for a Grammy Award for the album under the Latin Pop Album category.

== Track listing ==
1. "Por ella" (For Her)
2. "Amantes" (Lovers)
3. "Morriñas" (Homesickness)
4. "Viejas tradiciones" (Old Traditions)
5. "Ron y Coca Cola" (Rum And Coca-Cola)
6. "Hey (Hey!) 4:58
7. "Un sentimental" (I Am Sentimental)
8. "Paloma blanca" (White Dove)
9. "La nave del olvido" (The Ship of Oblivion)
10. "Pajaro Chogüi" (Chogui Bird)

== Charts ==
=== Weekly charts ===
Weekly chart performance for Hey!
Chart (1980–94)	Peak position
Argentine Albums (CAPIF)	1
Australian Albums (Kent Music Report)	65
Belgian Albums	1
Israelian Albums (IBA)	2
Dutch Albums (Album Top 100)	5
New Zealand Albums (RMNZ)	9
Spanish Albums (AFYVE)	1
US Billboard 200	179
US Top Latin Albums (Billboard)	4
US Latin Pop Albums (Billboard)	3
Venezuelan Albums	3

=== Year-end charts ===
Year-end chart performance for Hey!
Chart (1980)	Position
Dutch Albums (Album Top 100)	27
Spanish Albums (AFYVE)	1

== Sales and certifications ==
Region	Certification	Certified units/sales
Argentina	—	350,000
France	—	200,000
Greece	—	~ 50,000
Japan	—	10,000
Mexico	—	300,000
Netherlands (NVPI)	Gold	50,000^{^}
Puerto Rico	—	50,000
Spain (PROMUSICAE)	5× Platinum	1,000,000
United States (RIAA)	Gold	500,000^{^}
Summaries
Worldwide	—	4,000,000
^{^} Shipments figures based on certification alone.

== See also ==
- List of best-selling Latin albums
- List of best-selling albums in Spain
