= Marcelo Rossi =

Brazilian Catholic priest (born 1967)

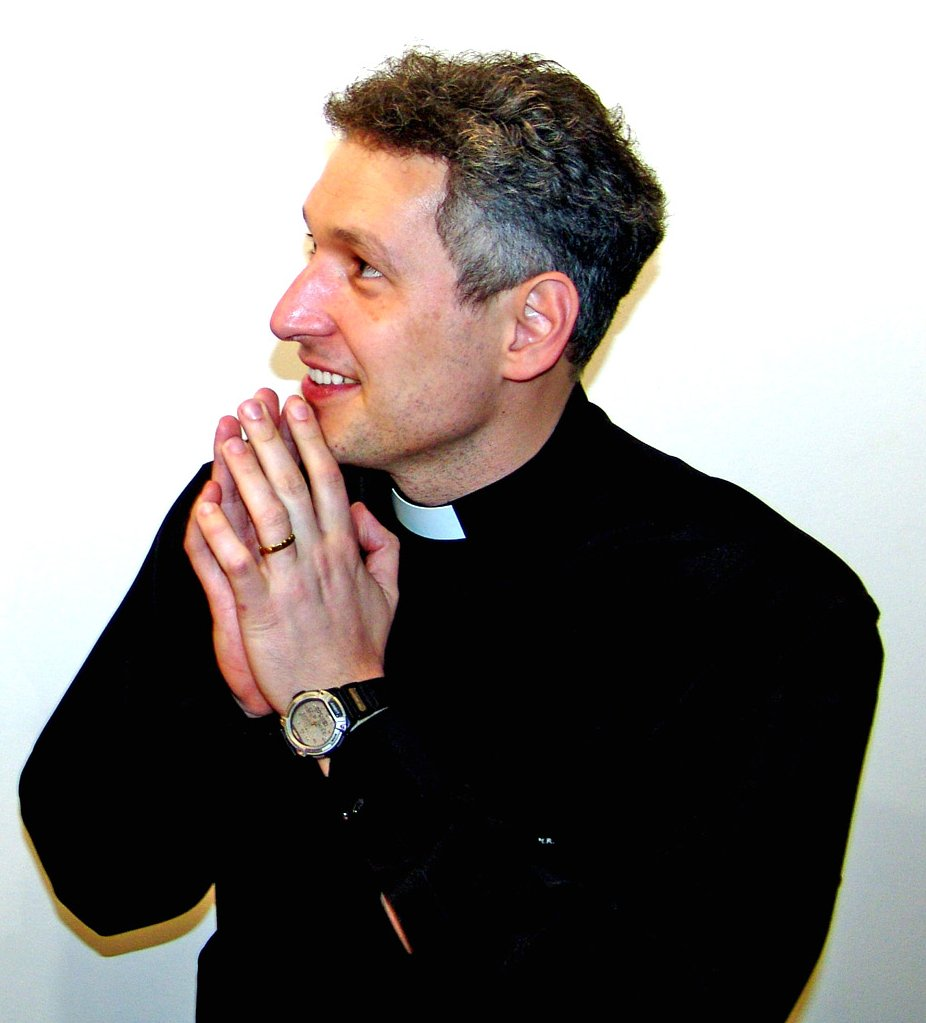
- Rossi in 2006

Personal life
- Born: Marcelo Mendonça Rossi; 20 May 1967 (age 59) São Paulo, Brazil
- Website: www.padremarcelorossi.com.br

Religious life
- Religion: Roman Catholicism
- School: Catholic Charismatic Renewal
- Ordination: 1 December 1994

Senior posting
- Based in: Santuário do Terço Bizantino

Military service
- Rank: Priest

Marcelo Mendonça Rossi (born 20 May 1967) is a Brazilian Catholic priest known for his novel approaches to ministering to the faithful. He is also a writer and a singer, and he uses music intensely in his Masses. He has recorded music CDs, hosts radio and TV programs, and has appeared as an actor in two movies with religious themes. All of these endeavours have been big hits in the media, but Father Rossi donates all the proceeds to Catholic charities and his own parish.

== Early life ==
Father Rossi is based in São Paulo city, where he was born into a Roman Catholic middle-class family and was raised in the neighbourhood of Santana together with his two sisters, Monica and Marta. His father, Antonio Rossi, worked as a bank manager for many years while his mother, Wilma, took care of the household. At the age 16, he made the decision not to attend church services any longer and, six years later, graduated in Physical Education at the Universidade de São Paulo (USP). Around that time, he lost one of his cousins in a car accident, and his aunt was diagnosed with a malignant brain tumour. These two family misfortunes filled him with pain and suffering, and led him to seek God by returning to Church and enrolling in the prayer groups of the Catholic Charismatic Renewal. Marcelo began to take part in parish activities and, a year later, inspired by a TV miniseries on the life of Pope John Paul II, decided to devote himself to the priesthood. He completed two university degrees: Philosophy at the Universidade Nossa Senhora da Assunção, and Theology at the Faculdade Salesiana de Lorena. On 1 December 1994, he was ordained to the priesthood.

== Priestly ministry ==
As a priest, Father Marcelo Rossi became a phenomenon of the mass media culture in the late 1990s. He began an intensive and enthusiastic work of preaching the Gospel, winning over the faithful who attended his Masses in the Parish of Perpétuo Socorro e Santa Rosalia, in Santo Amaro, São Paulo. As a result of the rapidly increasing turnout at his Masses, the celebrations were carried out in larger and larger spaces until he came to use the Avenue of the United Nations in São Paulo and even football stadiums like Maracanã and the Morumbi, as "headquarters" of his Masses on days of preaching and praying.

Rossi has become by far the biggest Christian artistic phenomenon in Latin America, with over 11 million albums sold throughout his entire career. He is known for his choreography of the Catholic Charismatic Renewal (CCR) movement, and the publication of works (CDs, DVDs, film and television). By dint of singing, dancing and doing choreography in crowded liturgies and TV shows, Father Marcelo Rossi aims to bring people together to Christ's message and the Church's teaching in an original yet modern and light way. He has recorded nine albums since 1998, regularly appears on TV shows, has his radio program with more than 100,000 listeners across the country and his church services out in the open attract thousands of faithful believers. In 1998, he decided to break into the music market and recorded several songs live on a CD entitled "Músicas para Louvar ao Senhor" (and the Spanish version "Canciones para alabar al Señor"). In 1999, he released his second CD "Um presente para Jesus", and in 2000, "Canções para um Novo Milênio".

In 2001, he launched the album Paz by Universal Music, which became the eighth best-selling album of that year and won him a nomination for a Latin Grammy in 2002, the year in which he released an album entitled Anjos by Sony Music. It turned out to be the fourteenth biggest-selling album of that year.

On 31 March 2002, during the celebration of Easter, Father Marcelo Rossi was appointed as Rector of the Santuário do Terço Bizantino in Jurubatuba – Santo Amaro, São Paulo state.

In 2003 he produced his sixth CD and made his first film "Maria, Mãe do Filho de Deus" which was a successful one In 2004 he launched his second film, "Irmãos de Fé" which was also very successful.

The year 2006 was marked by the release of the album Minha Benção by Sony BMG. It was the biggest-selling album of that year, getting diamond certification and triple platinum. The album Minha Benção was also the best-selling album of 2007, and in the same year the album Momento de Fé para uma Vida Melhor was released, which was the twelfth best-selling album of that year. In 2008, two albums that reached positions among the top sellers, called themselves, Paz Sim, Violência Não – Volume 1 and Paz Sim, Violência Não – Volume 2, reaching the second and sixth positions among the top sellers that year; volume 1 was certified in 2008 as double platinum in 2009 was certified as triple platinum. In the same year, the DVD Paz Sim – Violência Não (Volume 1) was the best-selling, according to the ABPD and received double platinum certification.

On 21 October 2010, Father Marcelo Rossi received from the hands of Pope Benedict XVI the "Cardinal Van Thuan Prize – Solidarity and Development 2010" – in recognition of his dedication to Catholicism as a modern evangelizer. In October 2011, he opened, on the outskirts of South São Paulo, an ecclesiastical centre that contains the largest Catholic church in Latin America. It can welcome up to 100,000 people: 25,000 within the church with a cantilever roof and 75,000 outside on an area of 30 hectares.

Father Marcelo Rossi currently performs live at 6 am every Sunday Mass in Your Home broadcast by Rede Globo television, and at 09:00 am the Mass is shown again on the website www.padremarcelorossi.com.br. He also takes part in the Life Network every Saturday at 15 hours Mass Sanctuary Mother of God, which also features the Byzantine Rosary program. On Radio Globo from 9 to 10 hours from Monday to Saturday, he conducts the Faith Moment Programme – considered by many journalists as an audience phenomenon of modern radio, with more than 3 million listeners/minute across the country.

He suffered an accident while exercising on a treadmill and was forced to conduct the celebration of 9 May on the banks of the Guarapiranga Reservoir, São Paulo, in a wheelchair. Throughout his convalescence he drew inspiration for writing his recent books: "Agape" and "Kairos" which sold more than 10 million and 2 million copies respectively, reaching record sales in Editora Globo's history and currently Rossi is in first place in the ranking of best-selling books in Brazil, according to Veja magazine. surpassing the "Da Vinci Code" by Dan Brown and all the books of the saga "Twilight". All proceeds from the book are donated to the construction of the Santuário da Mãe de Deus Theotokos.

He preaches at the Sanctuary of the Byzantine Rosary to huge and enthusiastic crowds, and has promoted the use of the so-called Byzantine rosary for praying. In 2003, one of his Masses, celebrated at soccer stadium, was held for the fourteen NASA astronauts who lost their lives in the Space Shuttle Challenger disaster 17 years earlier on 28 January 1986 and the more recent Space Shuttle Columbia disaster, and had more than 70,000 attendees.

== Controversies ==
=== Criticism ===
Father Marcelo Rossi is popular among Catholic charismatics and has played a significant role across the Catholic Charismatic Renewal movement in the Brazilian Catholic Church, which happens to have the largest number of faithful believers in the world, although a significant number of followers have been lost to the protestant evangelical churches over the last decades.

In 1997 he met with Pope John Paul II and conversed about the need to find a way of reversing the loss of membership in the Catholic Church. By adopting some of the charismatic features of these churches, Father Rossi and his acolytes have been able to win back or at least to retain a part of his brethren. Traditional Catholics in Brazil, however, do not always approve of these changes; Odilo Cardinal Scherer, the Archbishop of São Paulo and thus Rossi's direct superior, stated in reference to Father Rossi that "Priests must not be showmen... The Mass is not to be turned into a show". During Pope Benedict XVI's visit to Brazil in 2007, Rossi was steered away from the Pope, an experience he himself described as humiliating.

=== Jorge Lafond ===
In 2002, the press reported that on 10 November 2002, Father Rossi asked the presenter Gugu Liberato to remove comedian Jorge Lafond from the stage so that he could go on to sing. Lafond, who played the female character Vera Verão in the humorous program "The Square is Ours" ("A Praça é Nossa") on SBT, had been invited to participate in the show Men vs. Women on the TV program "Domingo Legal" (also SBT). Some media reported that Lafond was removed from the stage following a demand from Father Rossi, who was due to sing in the show in the next few minutes. While Lafond waited offstage, backstage production repeatedly requested that he return after the priest had left. However, embarrassed and embittered by the situation, he did not return. In an interview given to Revista Quem, Father Rossi mentioned the incident and denied discriminating against Lafond and claimed he had become aware of the incident after Lafond's death.

=== False accusation of plagiarism for the song "Noites Traiçoeiras" ===
Father Marcelo Rossi was accused of plagiarism in 2009. Protestant websites reported that justice would have recognized the pastor and singer Marinalva Santos as the author of the song "Noites Traiçoeiras" recorded by Father Rossi. It was said that all copyrights belong to the singer. However, the accuser became a defendant of a lawsuit filed by the representatives of the authentic author of the composition, Carlos Papae, who was recognized by law as the original composer of the song.

=== False accusation of plagiarism for the novel "Ágape" ===
On 13 May 2019, Rossi was again accused of plagiarism, this time in reference to the novel Ágape. The book was even suspended from sale. The police carried out an investigation and concluded that the accusation was false and that Father Rossi was the victim of fraud.

As a result, the accuser was arrested, along with two other people, and indicted for using a fraudulent document, forming a gang, slanderous denunciation and embezzlement. Father Rossi was cleared of plagiarism charges.

=== Attack ===
On 14 July 2019, during a mass in Cachoeira Paulista, a woman broke through security, invaded the stage during the celebration taking place at Canção Nova and pushed Rossi off the structure. At least 50,000 people participated in the celebration. Despite the fall, Rossi returned to the stage minutes later and continued the celebration. According to the Military Police, the woman was taken to the Lorena police station and gave a statement. The police said that the incident was caused by Canção Nova because Father Rossi decided not to register the assault. Her companions told the police that she suffers from mental disorders.

In a statement, Canção Nova said it regretted the incident that occurred with Father Rossi during the Mass and said that he was attended to by the event's medical team and, after being released, continued with the celebration until the end.

== Education and awards ==
- Degree in Physical Education by the Universidade de São Paulo in 1988
- Degree in Philosophy by the Universidade Nossa Senhora da Assunção in 1990
- Degree in Theology by the Faculdade Salesiana de Lorena in 1994
- Ordination to the Priesthood in 1994
- Best Christian album nominated for the Latin Grammy with the CD "Paz" in 2002
- Cardinal Van Thuan Prize granted by Pope Benedict XVI in 2010

== Discography ==
=== Solo studio albums ===
Year	Album	Record company	Certification (ABPD)	Sales
1998	Músicas para Louvar ao Senhor	Polygram do Brazil	3× Diamond	3,328,468
1999	Um Presente para Jesus	Universal Music	Diamond	2,500,000
2000	Canções para um Novo Milênio	Universal Music	Platinum	2,000,000
2001	Paz	Universal Music	Platinum	400,000
2002	Anjos	Sony Music	Platinum	350,000
2003	Maria, Mãe do Filho de Deus	Sony Music	Gold	1,000,000
2006	Minha Benção	Sony BMG	2× Diamond	1,200,000
2008	Paz Sim, Violência Não – Vol.1	Sony Music Entertainment	3× Platinum	500,000
2008	Paz Sim, Violência Não – Vol. 2	Sony Music Entertainment	2× Platinum	600,000
2011	Ágape Musical	Sony Music Entertainment	4× Diamond	2,000,000
2012	Ágape Amor Divino	Sony Music Entertainment	Diamond	700,000
2013	Já Deu Tudo Certo	Sony Music Entertainment	6× Diamond	2,050,000
2014	O Tempo de Deus	Sony Music Entertainment	Diamond	1,200,000

=== Complete discography ===
- 1997 – Terço Bizantino
- 1998 – Músicas para Louvar ao Senhor
- 1998 – Canciones para Alabar al Señor (in Spanish)
- 1999 – Um presente para Jesus
- 1999 – Salmos (box with 6 CDs)
- 1999 – Salmos Temáticos
- 2000 – Millenium (collectanea)
- 2000 – Canções para um Novo Milênio
- 2001 – Para Crianças (collectanea)
- 2001 – Paz
- 2001 – Sem Limite (collectanea)
- 2002 – Celebração da Vida
- 2002 – Anjos
- 2003 – Maria, Mãe do Filho de Deus
- 2003 – Jesus é o Rei
- 2006 – Novo Millenium (collectanea)
- 2006 – Minha Benção
- 2006 – Sem Limite Nova Edição (collectanea)
- 2007 – Maxximum
- 2007 – Momento de Fé para uma Vida Melhor – Em 16 volumes:
  - Momento de Fé – Volume 1 – (Depressão, Provações e Fé)
  - Momento de Fé – Volume 2 – (Liberação do Vício, Paz e Harmonia do lar)
  - Momento de Fé – Volume 3 – O Rosário
  - Momento de Fé – Volume 4 – O Cerco de Jericó
  - Momento de Fé – Volume 5 – A Via Sacra
  - Momento de Fé – Volume 6 – (Ressentimento, Mágoa, Perdão)
  - Momento de Fé – Volume 7 – (Paz, Proteção em Deus)
  - Momento de Fé – Volume 8 – (Maldade Humana, Misericórdia divina)
  - Momento de Fé – Volume 9 – (Amar a Deus Sobre Todas as Coisas e ao Próximo como a Si Mesmo)
  - Momento de Fé – Volume 10 – (Anjos e Arcanjos)
  - Momento de Fé – Volume 11 – (Avós, Pais e Filhos)
  - Momento de Fé – Volume 12 – (Fanatismo, Discriminação, Tolerância)
  - Momento de Fé – Volume 13 – (Influência dos Antepassados na Nossa Vida e Nossa Família)
  - Momento de Fé – Volume 14 – (Crianças, Adolescentes, Jovens, Adultos, Terceira Idade)
  - Momento de Fé – Volume 15 – (Dons de Santifição, Sabedoria, Entendimento, Conselho, Fortaleza, Ciência, Piedade, Santo Temor de Deus)
  - Momento de Fé – Volume 16 – (Educadores, Professores, Catequistas)
- 2007 – Momentos de Fé para uma Vida Melhor Edição de Natal
- 2008 – Paz Sim, Violência Não – Vol.1
- 2008 – Paz Sim, Violência Não – Vol. 2
- 2010 – Seleção Essencial - Grandes Sucessos (coletânea)
- 2011 – Ágape Musical
- 2012 – Ágape Amor Divino
- 2013 – Já Deu Tudo Certo - EP
- 2014 – O Tempo de Deus
- 2014 – Mega Hits (coletânea)
- 2017 – Luz Divina - Grandes Momentos (coletânea)
- 2017 – Imaculada (Ao Vivo)
- 2019 – Maria Passa À Frente E Pisa Na Cabeça Da Serpente - EP
- 2024 – Amorização - Vol. 1 - EP
- 2025 – Amorização - Vol. 2 - EP
- 2026 – Amorização

== Filmography ==
=== TV ===
- 2009 – A Turma do Didi (himself/special participation)

=== Movies ===
- 2003 – Maria, Mãe do Filho de Deus (Anjo Gabriel/himself) IMDb record
- 2004 – Irmãos de Fé (himself) IMDb record

=== Shows, clips, messages ===
- 1999 – Ao Vivo no Santuário Terço Bizantino
- 2000 – Um Presente para Jesus
- 2001 – Paz
- 2007 – Parabéns Pra Jesus
- 2007 – Momentos de Paz para uma Vida Melhor Edição de Natal
- 2008 – Paz Sim, Violência Não – Vol.1
- 2008 – Paz Sim, Violência Não – Vol.2
- 2012 – Ágape Amor Divino
- 2017 – Imaculada (Ao Vivo)

== See also ==
- Catholic Charismatic Renewal
- List of best-selling albums in Brazil
- List of best-selling Latin music artists
