= List of best-selling albums in Brazil =

The following is an independently list of best-selling albums in Brazil. This list can contain any types of album, including studio albums, extended plays, greatest hits, compilations, various artists, soundtracks and remixes. The list is divided by claimed sales from diverse media reports and certified units from Pro-Música Brasil when their certification program started in 1990; and thereafter by domestic (over 1 million) and international artists (over half-million).

Historically, Brazilian market have been dominated by their local artists and music. In 1996, the Associação Brasileira dos Produtores de Discos (ABPD and now Pro-Música Brasil) informed that Brazilian music represented 72% of record sales across the nation. Brazil has always been the largest music market in both Latin America and South America. As of 2018, the country was the world's 10th largest music market according to the International Federation of the Phonographic Industry (IFPI).

Numerous artists have multiplies entries, including Roberto Carlos. His album, Roberto Carlos (1981), received 12× Diamond from Pro-Música Brasil, denoting sales of more than 3 million (Diamond: 300,000 copies). According to Folha de S.Paulo, the million mark in the country was relatively common until 1998, when sales decreased due piracy.

== Best-selling albums (domestic artists) ==
Numerous albums by Brazilian artists have sold more than half-million based both in certified units and actual sales. By extension, this list of domestic repertoire is only limited to those albums with one or more million copies sold.

=== By certified units (since 1990) ===
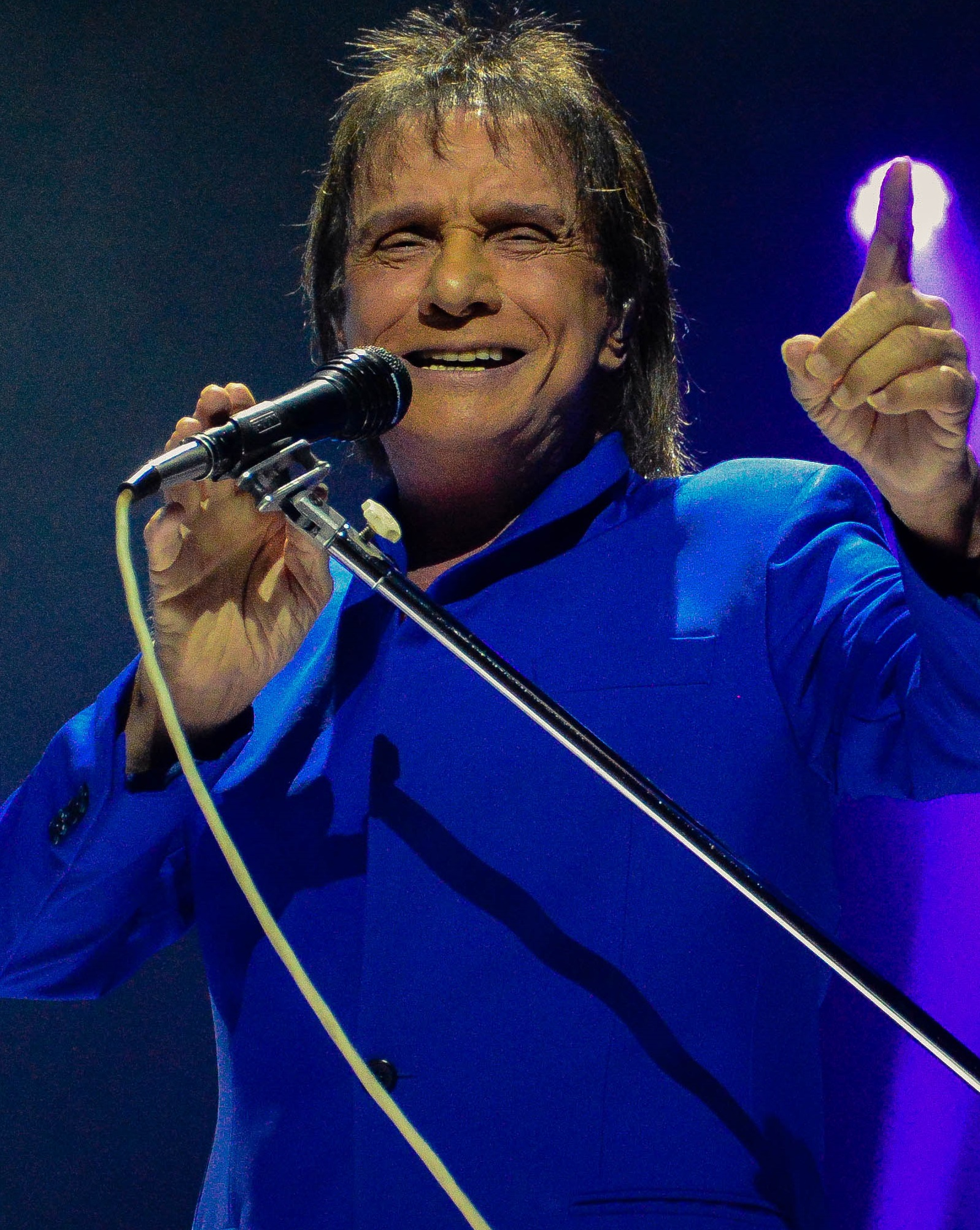
As of 2025, Roberto Carlos has the highest-certified album in Pro-Música Brasil, with Roberto Carlos (1981) receiving 12× Diamond

Albums over one million certified units
Rel. year	Album	Artist	Certification	Certified sales	Ref.
1981	Roberto Carlos	Roberto Carlos	12× Diamond	3,600,000	
1988	Xou da Xuxa 3	Xuxa	3× Diamond	3,000,000	
1967	em Ritmo de Aventura	Roberto Carlos	3× Diamond	3,000,000	
1997	Só pra Contrariar (1997)	Só Pra Contrariar	3× Diamond	3,000,000	
1998	Músicas para Louvar ao Senhor	Marcelo Rossi	3× Diamond	3,000,000	
1998	Um Sonhador	Leandro & Leonardo	3× Diamond	3,000,000	
1990	Leandro & Leonardo	Leandro & Leonardo	3× Diamond	3,000,000	
1987	Xegundo Xou da Xuxa	Xuxa	2× Diamond	2,000,000	
1989	4º Xou da Xuxa	Xuxa	2× Diamond	2,000,000	
1986	Xou da Xuxa	Xuxa	2× Diamond	2,000,000	
1997	Na Cabeça e na Cintura	É o Tchan!	2× Diamond	2,000,000	
1997	É o Tchan do Brasil	É o Tchan!	2× Diamond	2,000,000	
1998	Terra Samba ao Vivo e a Cores	Terra Samba	2× Diamond	2,000,000	
1998	Mais do Mesmo	Legião Urbana	2× Diamond	2,000,000	
1999	As Quatro Estações	Sandy & Junior	2× Diamond	2,000,000	
2011	Ágape Musical	Marcelo Rossi	5× Diamond	1,500,000	
1987	Que País É Este	Legião Urbana	Diamond	1,000,000	
1990	Xuxa 5	Xuxa	2× Diamond	1,000,000	
1993	O Canto da Cidade	Daniela Mercury	Diamond	1,000,000	
1994	Sexto Sentido	Xuxa	Diamond	1,000,000	
1994	Roberto Carlos (1994)	Roberto Carlos	Diamond	1,000,000	
1995	Roberto Carlos (1995)	Roberto Carlos	Diamond	1,000,000	
1995	Mamonas Assassinas	Mamonas Assassinas	Diamond	1,000,000	
1999	Um Presente Para Jesus	Marcelo Rossi	Diamond	1,000,000	
1999	Acústico MTV	Legião Urbana	Diamond	1,000,000	
1999	Só pra Contrariar (1999)	Só Pra Contrariar	Diamond	1,000,000	
2000	Quatro Estações: O Show	Sandy & Junior	Diamond	1,000,000	
2000	Laços de Família (International)	Various	Diamond	1,000,000	
2000	Amor Sem Limite	Roberto Carlos	Diamond	1,000,000	
2001	Acústico MTV - Roberto Carlos	Roberto Carlos	Diamond	1,000,000	
2003	Tribalistas	Tribalistas	Diamond	1,000,000	
2006	Minha Benção	Marcelo Rossi	2× Diamond	1,000,000	

=== Claimed sales only ===
Albums with claimed sales over 1.5 million
Rel. year	Album	Artist	Claimed sales	Ref.
1988	Xou da Xuxa 3	Xuxa	5,000,000^{†}	
1982	Rita Lee & Roberto de Carvalho	Rita Lee	2,000,000	

== Best-selling albums by international artists ==
Color
Album certified by Pro-Música Brasil

=== By certified units (since 1990) ===
*Positions based on certified sales and release year.

Rel. year	Album	Artist	Certification	Certified sales	Ref.
1995	Jagged Little Pill	Alanis Morissette	2× Platinum + 2× Platinum^{‡}	1,000,000	
2014	1989	Taylor Swift	2× Diamond + 2× Diamond^{‡}	820,000	
1990	Serious Hits... Live!	Phil Collins	3× Platinum	750,000	
1992	The Bodyguard	Various artists / Whitney Houston^{§}	3× Platinum	750,000	
2008	I Am... Sasha Fierce	Beyoncé	2× Diamond + 3× Platinum^{‡}	680,000	
1989	Like a Prayer	Madonna	2× Platinum	500,000	
1990	The Immaculate Collection	Madonna	2× Platinum	500,000	
1990	In concert	The Three Tenors	2× Platinum	500,000	
1991	Greatest Hits II	Queen	2× Platinum	500,000	
1997	Paint the Sky with Stars	Enya	2× Platinum	500,000	
1997	Backstreet's Back	Backstreet Boys	2× Platinum	500,000	
1999	Millennium	Backstreet Boys	2× Platinum	500,000	
1999	Californication	Red Hot Chili Peppers	2× Platinum	500,000	

=== By claimed sales ===
Most examples here are albums released before the existence of certification program started in 1990 by Pro-Música Brasil. However, some of them received retroactively certifications by the organization.

Rel. year	Album	Artist	Claimed sales
1981	De niña a mujer	Julio Iglesias	2,000,000; 1,900,000
1983	Thriller	Michael Jackson	2,000,000
1995	Pies Descalzos	Shakira	1,500,000; 750,000
1984	Mania	Menudo	1,500,000
1994	The Lion King	Various artists (Elton John, Hans Zimmer et al)	1,200,000
1987	Bad	Michael Jackson	1,100,000
1984	Evolución	Menudo	1,000,000
1984	Reaching Out	Menudo	1,000,000
1982	Momentos	Julio Iglesias	1,000,000; 900,000
1986	True Blue	Madonna	1,000,000; 818,600
1997	Romanza	Andrea Bocelli	900,000
1985	We Are the World	USA For Africa	850,000
1990	Starry Night	Julio Iglesias	750,000
1985	Brothers in Arms	Dire Straits	750,000; 500,000
1985	Like a Virgin	Madonna	715,000
1989	Like a Prayer	Madonna	710,000
1997	Titanic: Music from the Motion Picture	James Horner	650,000
1987	Un hombre solo	Julio Iglesias	600,000
1997	Let's Talk About Love	Celine Dion	500,000
1982	Julio	Julio Iglesias	500,000
1991	Romance	Luis Miguel	500,000
1991	Dangerous	Michael Jackson	500,000

== See also ==
- List of best-selling singles in Brazil
- List of best-selling albums by country
- List of best-selling music artists in Brazil

== Notes ==
- ^§ The album is not credited to Whitney Houston but to "TSO O Guarda-Costas" (various artists) at Pro-Música Brasil's database.
- ^{‡}Certification include on-demand audio and video streams and track sale equivalent
- ^{†}According to figures provided by the Association of Brazilian Record Producers in 1988, the album sold 2,639,000 copies within that year.
