= Facundo Cabral =

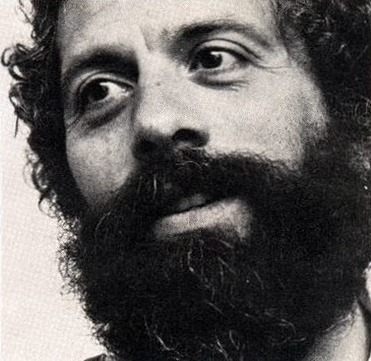
- Cabral in the Pateando tachos album (1984)

Background information
- Also known as: El Indio Gasparino
- Born: Rodolfo Enrique Cabral Camiñas; May 22, 1937; La Plata, Buenos Aires, Argentina
- Died: July 9, 2011 (aged 74) Guatemala City, Guatemala
- Genres: Troubadour, folklore, folk rock, protest
- Occupations: Singer-songwriter, poet
- Instruments: Vocals, guitar, harmonica
- Years active: 1959–2011
- Label: RCA Victor

Signature of Facundo Cabral

Facundo Cabral (born Rodolfo Enrique Cabral Camiñas; May 22, 1937 – July 9, 2011) was an Argentine singer-songwriter.

He was best known as the composer of "No soy de aquí, ni soy de allá" ("I'm not from here nor from there"), "Pobrecito mi Patrón" ("My Poor Boss"), and many other compositions. His songs have been covered by multiple Spanish language performers such as Jorge Cafrune, Alberto Cortez, Juan Luis Guerra, and Joan Manuel Serrat. Cabral protested military dictatorships in Latin America through activism and art from the 1970s onward, and his music combined mysticism and spirituality with calls for social justice and equality.

After touring the world, Cabral enjoyed popularity in his home country during the early 1980s, when Argentine radio demanded local content after the Falklands War. He was popular throughout Latin America in his lifetime and still enjoys a sizeable posthumous legacy throughout the continent. For his advocacy for peace through his work, Facundo Cabral was named a UNESCO Messenger of Peace in 1996.

== Religious and political views ==
Cabral expressed that his spiritual views were influenced by a variety of figures, including Jesus, Laozi, Zhuang Zhou, Rajneesh, Jiddu Krishnamurti, Gautama Buddha, Schopenhauer, John the Baptist, Francis of Assisi, Gandhi and Mother Teresa. He also had admiration for the writings of Jorge Luis Borges (with whom he engaged in philosophical discussions) and of Walt Whitman.

Cabral described himself as "violently pacifist", a "first-class homeless person" and a "philosophical anarchist". On his view of anarchism, Cabral said: "I'm an Anarchist, which is worse than a Communist. For that reason I have never voted, I have never got involved in politics because politics divides and I separate myself from all that which divides. No one, no politician, is going to change our reality."

== Death ==
Cabral was shot and killed during a tour in Guatemala City while en route to La Aurora International Airport on July 9, 2011.

Cabral was with his agent David Llanos and Henry Fariña, who were wounded. He was accompanied by a second vehicle carrying bodyguards, but they couldn't protect the singer's vehicle, which tried to flee the attackers by driving into a fire station. At least 20 bullet holes were seen in the Range Rover car he was in. The gunmen were in three late-model vehicles, one in front of Cabral's car and two to the right and left. One of the attackers' vehicles was later found abandoned on the road to El Salvador. It was a brown Hyundai Santa Fe with bullet holes and containing bulletproof vests and an AK-47 magazine. Early investigations indicated that the trajectory of the bullets was from right to left, toward the driver's seat, indicating that the bullets were meant for the driver, Cabral's Nicaraguan promoter Henry Fariña, possibly because of troubles with organized crime related to drugs. Fariña was imprisoned for 30 years in 2012 for drug trafficking, organised crime, and money laundering.

In March 2012, Colombian authorities announced the arrest of Alejandro Jiménez (a.k.a. El Palidejo), who is believed to have ordered the murder of Fariña as he was taking Cabral to the airport. In 2016 five men, including Jiménez, were sentenced to prison terms of 50 years or more for the murder.
