= Zärtlichkeiten =

Zartlichkeiten

Studio album by Julio Iglesias
- Released: 1981
- Studio: Latin pop
- Length: 38:45
- Label: CBS
- Producer: Ramon Arcusa, Michael Kunze

Julio Iglesias chronology
| Fidèle (1981) | Zartlichkeiten (1981) | Begin the Beguine (1981) |

Zärtlichkeiten is the twenty-sixth studio album by Spanish pop artist Julio Iglesias. It was released in 1981.

== Track listing ==
1. "Mit Tränen in den Augen ist man blind (Hey)" (5:00)
2. "Ich hab gelacht, ich hab geweint" (3:42)
3. "Eine Rose, die nie welkt (Por un poco de tu amor)" (2:54)
4. "Amigo, ich wollt' immer ein Adler sein (Gavilan o paloma)" (4:35)
5. "Bleib bei mir bis zum Morgen (Para que no me olvides)" (4:02)
6. "Wo bist Du (Como tu)" (3:31)
7. "Du bist mein erster Gedanke" (3:54)
8. "...Aber der Traum war sehr schön (When They Begin the Beguine)" (4:45)
9. "Wo mein Sonne scheint" (3:23)
10. "Sie war da (Jurame)" (4:07)

== Certifications ==
| Region | Certification | Certified units/sales |
|---|---|---|
| Germany (BVMI) | Gold | 250,000^{^} |
| Switzerland (IFPI Switzerland) | Gold | 25,000^{^} |
^{^} Shipments figures based on certification alone.
