= Begin the Beguine =

1935 song by Cole Porter

Single by Artie Shaw and His Orchestra (original issues as "Art" Shaw)
- A-side: "Indian Love Call"
- Published: October 16, 1935 by Harms, Inc., New York
- Released: August 17, 1938
- Recorded: July 24, 1938
- Studio: RCA Victor, New York City
- Genre: Swing; traditional pop
- Length: 3:22
- Label: Bluebird B-7746
- Composers: Cole Porter; arranged by Artie Shaw and Jerry Gray

"Begin the Beguine" is a popular song written by Cole Porter, composed during a 1935 cruise aboard the Franconia from Kalabahi to Fiji. The song was introduced in the Broadway musical Jubilee in October 1935, performed by June Knight at the Imperial Theatre.

The first successful recording was a swing and traditional pop version by Artie Shaw and His Orchestra in 1938. Julio Iglesias released a Spanish language version in 1981, which reached No. 1 on the U.K. chart, the first fully Spanish song to top that chart.

== Music ==
The beguine is a dance and music form, similar to a slow rhumba. In his book American Popular Song: The Great Innovators 1900–1950, musicologist and composer Alec Wilder, described "Begin the Beguine" as

a maverick, it is an unprecedented experiment and one which, to this day, after hearing it hundreds of times, I cannot sing or whistle or play from start to finish without the printed music ... about the sixtieth measure I find myself muttering another title, 'End the Beguine'.

== Artie Shaw version ==
At first, the song gained little popularity, perhaps because of its length and unconventional form. Josephine Baker danced to it in her return to the United States in the Ziegfeld Follies of 1936, but neither she nor the song was successful. Two years later, however, bandleader Artie Shaw recorded an arrangement of the song, an extended swing orchestra version, in collaboration with his arranger and orchestrator, Jerry Gray.

After signing a new recording contract with RCA Victor, Shaw chose "Begin the Beguine" to be the first of six tunes he would record with his new 14-piece band in his first recording session with RCA Victor. The session was held at the RCA Victor's "Studio 2" at 155 East 24th Street in New York City on July 24, 1938. Until then, Shaw's band had been having a tough time finding an identity and maintaining its existence without having had any popular hits of significance. His previous recording contract with Brunswick had lapsed at the end of 1937 without being renewed.

Because RCA Victor was pessimistic with the whole idea of recording the long tune that not listeners had difficulty remembering all the way through, it was released as the "B" side of the record "Indian Love Call", issued on the RCA Victor Bluebird label as catalog number B-7746. Shaw's persistence paid off when the song became a best-selling record in 1938, peaking at no. 3, skyrocketing Shaw and his band to fame and popularity. The recording became one of the most famous and popular of the entire Swing Era. Subsequent reissues by RCA Victor (catalog number 20-1551) and later releases on LP, tape and CD have kept the recording continuously available ever since its original release in 1938.

== Later popularity ==
After Shaw introduced the song to dance halls, Metro-Goldwyn-Mayer released the musical film Broadway Melody of 1940. The song is one of its musical numbers, first sung in dramatic style by mezzo-soprano Lois Hodnott on a tropical set, with Eleanor Powell and Fred Astaire dancing in flamenco choreography. It is continued in the then contemporary jazz style by The Music Maids, with Powell and Astaire tap dancing to a big-band accompaniment.

In short order, all of the major big bands recorded it, including Harry James, Benny Goodman, Tommy Dorsey and Glenn Miller, often as an instrumental, as in the film. As a vocal song, it also became a pop standard, beginning with Joe Loss and Chick Henderson, the first pop vocal record to sell a million copies; new interpretations are often still measured against renditions by Frank Sinatra and Ella Fitzgerald, and Elvis Presley did an adaptation of his own. "Begin the Beguine" became such a classic during World War II that Max Beckmann adopted the title for a painting in 1946 (which the University of Michigan Museum of Art purchased in 1948). In the 1986 film The Worst Witch, the Grand Wizard character (Tim Curry) references "Begin the Beguine" in his song about Halloween. In June 2026, CBS News included the song in its list of the 250 essential American songs of the past 250 years.

== Julio Iglesias version ==
"Begin the Beguine (Volver a Empezar)"

Single by Julio Iglesias

from the album De niña a mujer
- B-side: "De niña a mujer"
- Released: 1981
- Genre: Disco
- Length: 4:45
- Label: CBS
- Songwriters: Cole Porter, Julio Iglesias

Julio Iglesias recorded a Spanish version of "Begin the Beguine", titled "Volver a Empezar" in Spanish. Iglesias himself wrote new Spanish lyrics for this song, which is about lost love rather than a dance. Apart from the opening lines, the full song is in Spanish. The song was produced in Madrid with an arrangement by producer Ramón Arcusa, using the rhythm from Johnny Mathis's disco version of the song.

The song reached No. 1 in the UK Singles Chart in December 1981. It is the first fully Spanish language song to have reached No. 1 on the British chart, although Iglesias is the second Spanish act to top the chart (after Baccara who topped the chart with "Yes Sir, I Can Boogie" sung in English). The song was certified Gold by the BPI in the UK. The song also spent three weeks at No. 1 in the Irish Singles Chart. In Japan, it sold 96,170 units. Iglesias also recorded the song in different languages – "Venezia a Settembre" in Italian; "Une chanson qui revient" in French, which reached No. 30 in France; and "...aber der Traum war sehr schön" in German, which reached No. 57 in the West German chart.

=== Charts ===
==== Weekly charts ====
| Chart (1981–82) | Peak position |
|---|---|
| Australia (Kent Music Report) | 41 |
| Austria (Ö3 Austria Top 40) | 8 |
| Belgium (Ultratop 50 Flanders) | 17 |
| Germany (GfK) | 57 |
| Ireland (IRMA) | 1 |
| Israel (IBA) | 3 |
| Japan (Oricon) | 31 |
| Netherlands (Single Top 100) | 44 |
| New Zealand (Recorded Music NZ) | 25 |
| Spain (AFYVE) | 15 |
| Switzerland (Schweizer Hitparade) | 7 |
| UK Singles (Official Charts) | 1 |

==== Year-end charts ====
| Chart (1981) | Rank |
|---|---|
| UK Singles (OCC) | 19 |

| Chart (1982) | Rank |
|---|---|
| Australia (Kent Music Report) | 117 |

=== Certifications and sales ===
| Region | Certification | Certified units/sales |
|---|---|---|
| Japan | — | 96,170 |
| United Kingdom (BPI) | Silver | 500,000 |

== Other notable versions ==
- Xavier Cugat and his orchestra recorded one of the first versions in 1935, with a stronger Latin sound than later versions. The song was recorded as an instrumental, although a vocalist (Don Reid) sings the title and the beginning and end of the song. This recording reached the charts of the day.
- Leslie Hutchinson recorded a version on April 3, 1940. This recording was given to the Indian spiritual figure Meher Baba, who later asked that it be played seven times at his tomb when his body was laid to rest, which occurred a week after his death on January 31, 1969.
- Bing Crosby recorded a version on May 3, 1944.
- Eddie Heywood and his orchestra recorded a single version in 1944 and this reached the USA charts in 1945 peaking in the No. 16 spot.
- Frank Sinatra recorded the song on February 24, 1946, which reached the Billboard charts in the No. 23 position.
- Jo Stafford recorded a version in March 1949, with Paul Weston and his orchestra, backed by The Starlighters.
- Ella Fitzgerald recorded it for her 1956 album Ella Fitzgerald Sings the Cole Porter Songbook.
- Perry Como recorded his version of the song for the album, Como Swings, released in 1959.
- Ann-Margret performs the song on her 1962 album The Vivacious One.
- Pete Townshend recorded a version for the 1970 collaboration album Happy Birthday, an album dedicated to Meher Baba.
- Johnny Mathis recorded a popular disco version in 1978, included on his The Best Days of My Life (1979). The rhythm track of Mathis's version was used by Julio Iglesias in his recording.
- Teresa Teng recorded an English language version for her 1983 album Tabibito (旅人). She also record a Chinese language version (愛的開始) for her 1984 album Love Songs of Island, Vol. 8: Lovely Messenger (島國情歌第八集: 愛的使者).
- Melora Hardin performed the song in the 1991 film, The Rocketeer. It was featured on both the original and expanded motion picture soundtracks, released in 1991 and 2016 respectively.
- American singer-songwriter Michael Peter Smith recorded a version for his 1994 album Michael Margaret Pat & Kate which featured songs from his autobiographical play of the same name.
- Michael Nesmith covered this song, along with "In the Still of the Night" for his 1994 album Tropical Campfires.
- Jazz guitarist Tuck Andress recorded an acoustic bossa nova version for his 1990 solo album Reckless Precision.
- Sheryl Crow performed the song in the Cole Porter biopic De-Lovely. At the request of the film's director, Irwin Winkler, the film's musical director, Stephen Endelman, controversially arranged the song in a minor key.

== See also ==
- List of 1930s jazz standards
