= Trem da Alegria =

- Origin: Brazil
- Genres: Children's music
- Years active: 1984–1992
- Labels: RCA

Trem da Alegria (Train of Happiness) was a children's musical band based in Brazil. During their tenure from 1984 to 1992, they released eight albums whose total sales surpassed six million copies.

The band started in 1984 with Luciano Nassyn and Patricia Marx, recording the album Clube da Criança with Xuxa and Carequinha. The duo's boom came with the album Carossel da Esperança and the hit single "É de Chocolate".

Trem da Alegria's "members were 'recruited by advertising agencies'". In 1985, after Juninho Bill joined the band, they recorded their first album, Trem da Alegria do Clube da Criança, which featured guest performers Lucinha Lins ("Dona Felicidade") and The Fevers ("Uni, Duni, Te"). Trem was among Brazil's top-selling artists during 1987, along with Xuxa and Jairzinho e Simony.

== Members ==
Originais
Members	Year	Entrance order
Luciano Nassyn	1985–88	First formation
Patricia Marx	1985–87	First formation
Juninho Bill	1985–92	First formation
Vanessa Delduque	1986–88	Second formation
Others
Member	Year	Replaced
Fabíola Braga	1987	Patrícia Marx
Amanda Acosta	1988–92	Fabíola Braga
Rubinho Cabrera	1989–92	Luciano Nassyn
Ricky Bueno	1991	Vanessa Delduque
New Generation
Member	Year	Entrance order
João Augusto Matos	2002–05	First formation
Bárbara Lívia	2002–05	First formation
Caroline Sayuri	2002–05	First formation
Yago Piemonte	2002–05	First formation

== See also ==
- Turma do Balão Mágico
