= Patricia Marx (singer) =

Brazilian singer-songwriter (born 1974)

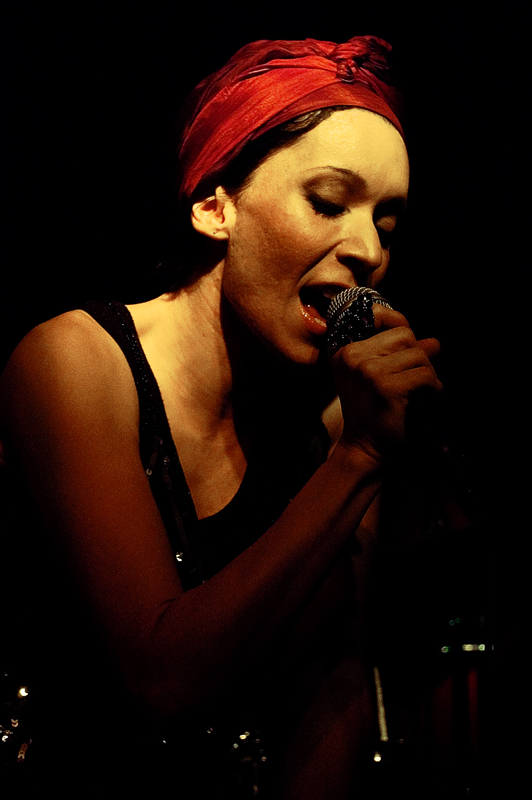
- Marx in 2007
- Born: Patricia Marquez de Azevedo; 28 June 1974 (age 52); São Paulo, Brazil
- Occupation: singer-songwriter
- Years active: 1983–present
- Musical career
- Genres: MPB, electronic, indie, jazz, neo-soul, bossa nova, samba, latin

Patricia Marquez de Azevedo (born 28 June 1974), known professionally as Patricia Marx, is a Brazilian singer-songwriter.

== Life and career ==
Born in São Paulo, Marx started her career as a child, taking part in the 1983 Rede Manchete children show Clube da Criança, and shortly later becoming a member of the children's musical band Trem da Alegria. In 1987, she left the group and made her solo debut with the album Patrícia ‘Paty’, which sold over 350,000 copies and was certified platinum.

Starting from 2010, Marx released several albums in couple with her then husband Bruno E. In 2023, she took part in The Masked Singer Brasil as a member of the trio Os Suculentos ('The Succulents') with Rosanah Fienngo and Sylvinho Blau-Blau.

=== Personal life ===
Marx was married to the producer Bruno E. for 18 years and they had a son, Arthur. In March 2020, Marx revealed to be a lesbian, and the same year she married the architect Renata Pedreira. She converted to Buddhism.

== Discography ==
Albums

- Patrícia ‘Paty’ (1987)
- Patrícia (1988)
- Incertezas (1990)
- Neoclássico (1992)
- Ficar com Você (1994)
- Quero Mais (1995)
- Charme do Mundo (1997)
- Respirar (2002)
- Patrícia Marx (2004)
- Patricia Marx & Bruno E. (2010)
- Trinta (2013)
- Te Cuida Meu Bem - Sextape, Pt. 1 (2014)
- Nova (2018)
- João (EP) (2020)
- MARXWADO (2023)
- Nos Dias de Hoje, Esteja Tranquilo (2025)
