= Xuxa filmography =

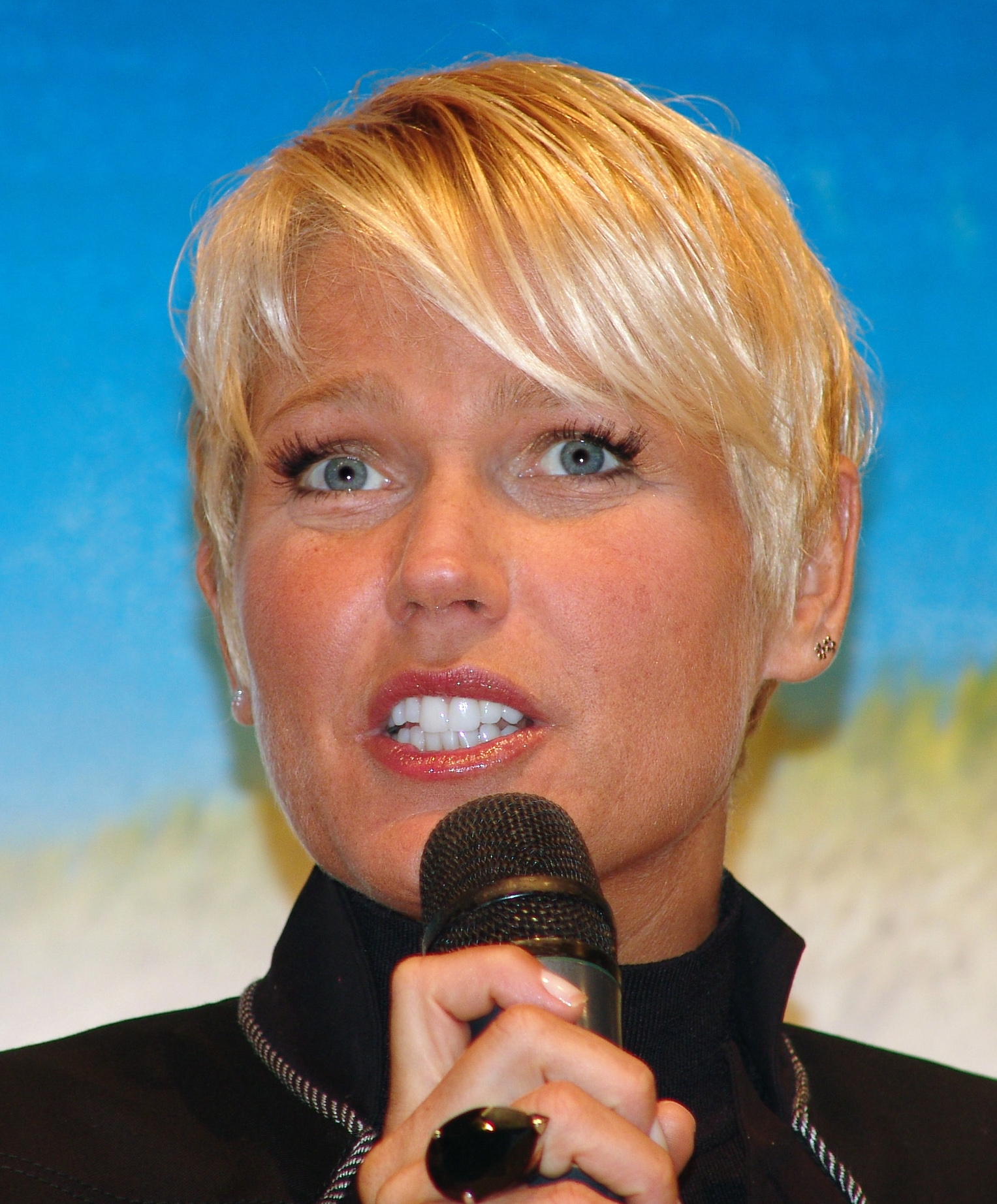
Xuxa in 2006.

This is a complete filmography of Xuxa, a Brazilian singer, actress, and television presenter.

Xuxa's first starring role was in Amor Estranho Amor (English title: Love Strange Love), a controversial 1982, erotic film directed by Walter Hugo Khouri. The plot involves an adult man's recollection of a short period in his life in 1937. As a teenager, he visited his mother, the favorite woman of an important politician, in a bordello owned by her, right before key political changes in Brazil. In those hours, he discovers his own sexuality. Although rather tame by today's modern standards, the movie was considered somewhat controversial by some because it contains two brief scenes of sensuality between a libertine character played by Xuxa and the teenager.

She broke out on her own in 1988 in Super Xuxa contra Baixo Astral, only to rejoin the Os Trapalhões in 1989 in A Princesa Xuxa e os Trapalhões, one of the quartet's most popular movies. The formula was repeated the following year in O Mistério de Robin Hood (1990), on which Xuxa's production company Xuxa Produções acted as associate producer.

In 1990 Xuxa teamed up with another hugely popular children's TV performer, Sérgio Mallandro, in a joint venture entitled Lua de Cristal. With just under 5 million spectators, it was the biggest film of the 1990s, and it guaranteed Xuxa a second box-officie hit at a time when the Brazilian film industry had all but ground to a halt.

She returned to cinemas in 1999 with Xuxa Requebra. Xuxa also picked up a popular fascination with duendes and their magical powers in Xuxa e os Duendes, and the sequel, Xuxa e os Duendes 2 - No Caminho das Fadas. She released another couple of films in quick succession in 2003 and 2004, Xuxa Abracadabra and Xuxa e o Tesouro da Cidade Perdida.

In 2009, Xuxa launched her film Xuxa em O Mistério de Feiurinha, which tells the story of what happens in fairy tales after the "and they all lived happily ever after" ending. The film is an adaptation of Pedro Bandeira's book O Fantástico Mistério de Feiurinha that has sold over 2 million copies. The movie's cast included such names as: Sasha, Luciano Szafir and Luciano Huck, Angélica and Hebe Camargo. It had over 1.3 million viewers and was also shown in the US and Angola, where its numbers surpassed James Cameron's Avatar.

== Film ==
Year	Title	Role	Notes
1982	Love Strange Love	Tamara	Film debut role
1983	Fuscão Preto	Diana	
1983	O Trapalhão na Arca de Noé	Lira	
1984	Os Trapalhões e o Mágico de Oróz	Aninha	
1985	Os Trapalhões no Reino da Fantasia	Irmã Maria	
1988	Super Xuxa contra Baixo Astral	Super Xuxa	
1989	A Princesa Xuxa e os Trapalhões	Princesa Sharon	
1990	Lua de Cristal	Maria da Graça	
1990	O Mistério de Robin Hood	Tatiana	
1991	Gaúcho Negro	Narrator	
1999	O Livro da Selva - A História de Mowgli	Black Panther	Voice
1999	Xuxa Requebra	Nena (Helena)	
2000	Xuxa Popstar	Nick	
2001	Xuxa e os Duendes	Kira	
2002	Xuxa e os Duendes 2: No Caminho das Fadas	Kira / Elf of the Light	
2003	Xuxa Abracadabra	Sofia	
2004	Xuxa e o Tesouro da Cidade Perdida	Bárbara / Deusa Blomma	
2005	Xuxinha e Guto contra os Monstros do Espaço	Xuxinha	Voice
2006	Xuxa Gêmeas	Elizabeth Dourado / Mel Monthiel (Margareth Dourado)	
2007	Xuxa em Sonho de Menina	Kika	
2009	Xuxa em O Mistério de Feiurinha	Cinderella	
2016	Porta dos Fundos: Contrato Vitalício	Herself	Cameo
2023	Uma Fada Veio Me Visitar	Tatu	
2024	Vidente por Acidente	Herself	
2024	Mallandro, o Errado Que Deu Certo	Anjo	

== Television ==
=== Brazil ===
Year	Title	Network
1983; 85	Clube da Criança	Rede Manchete
1986; 93	Xou da Xuxa	Rede Globo
1989	Bobeou Dançou	Rede Globo
1990	Xuper Star	Rede Globo
1992	Paradão da Xuxa	Rede Globo
1993	Xuxa	Rede Globo
1994; 2001	Xuxa Park	Rede Globo
1995; 96	Xuxa Hits	Rede Globo
1997; 2002	Planeta Xuxa	Rede Globo
2002; 4	Xuxa no Mundo da Imaginação	Rede Globo
2005; 14	TV Xuxa	Rede Globo
2007; 8	Conexão Xuxa	Rede Globo
2015; 16	Xuxa Meneghel	RecordTV
2017; 19	Dancing Brasil	RecordTV
2019	Geração Xuxa	RecordTV
2019; 20	The Four Brasil	RecordTV

=== International ===
Year	Program	Network	Country
1991; 93	El Show de Xuxa	Telefe	Argentina / Latin America / United States
1992; 93	Xuxa Park	Telecinco	Spain
1993	Xuxa	Broadcast syndication / The Family Channel	United States / Canada
2011; 14	Mundo da Xuxa	Globo TV International	Europe / Africa / United States / Japan

=== Telenovelas and series ===
Year	Title	Role	Notes
1982	Elas por Elas	Leda	172 episodes
1999	Torre de Babel	Herself	Episode: "#1.28"
2012	As Brasileiras	Rita	Episode: "A Fofoqueira de Porto Alegre"
2013	Guerra dos Sexos	Teresinha Romano	Episode: "26 April"

=== Television special ===
Year	Title
1986	Criança Esperança
1987	Natal da Xuxa
1988	Natal da Xuxa
1989	Natal da Xuxa
1990	Xuxa Especial
1991	Xuxa Especial – Fábrica de Ilusões
1992	Xuxa Especial – Lar dos Idosos
1993	Xuxa Especial – Presentes Mágicos
1994	Xuxa Especial – Crer Pra Ver
1995	Xuxa Especial – Deu a Louca Na Fantasia
1996	Xuxa 10 anos
1996	Direito de Ser Feliz
1996	Xuxa Especial – Natal Sem Noel
1997	A Festa dos Brinquedos
1997	Luz da Paz
1998	Xuxa 12 Anos com Você
1998	Uma Carta Para Deus
2000	TV Ano 50
2001; 2	Planeta Verão
2003	Siga Aquela Estrela
2004	Xuxa Especial de Natal – Papai Noel Sumiu
2005	Xuxa Especial de Natal – Folias de Natal
2006	Xuxa 20 anos
2006	Xuxa Especial de Natal – Natal Todo Dia
2007	Xuxa Especial de Natal – Giramundo
2007	Conexão Xuxa
2008	Xuxa e as Noviças
2009	Natal de Luz da Xuxa
2010	Xuxa Especial de Natal
2015 present	Família Record
