= Xuxa e os Duendes 2: No Caminho das Fadas =

2002 children's film

- Theatrical release poster
- Directed by: Paulo Sérgio de Almeida; Rogério Gomes; Márcio Vito
- Written by: Vivian Perl; Wagner de Assis
- Produced by: Diler Trindade
- Starring: Xuxa Meneghel; Luciano Szafir; Betty Lago; Vera Fischer; Ana Maria Braga; Deborah Secco; Thiago Fragoso; Guilherme Karan; Debby Lagranha
- Cinematography: Antonio Freire
- Music by: Mu Carvalho; Ana Zingone; Dudu Falcão
- Production companies: Xuxa Produções; Diler & Associados; Globo Filmes; Warner Bros.
- Distributed by: Warner Bros.
- Release date: December 13, 2002 (Brazil)
- Running time: 91 minutes
- Country: Brazil
- Language: Portuguese
- Budget: R$ 5.0 million
- Box office: R$ 11.4 million

Xuxa e os Duendes 2: No Caminho das Fadas (transl. Xuxa and the Elves 2: On the Road of the Fairies) is a 2002 Brazilian fantasy adventure children's film directed by Paulo Sérgio de Almeida, Rogério Gomes, and Márcio Vito and written by Vivian Perl and Wagner de Assis. It is the sequel to Xuxa e os Duendes (2001). Xuxa Meneghel, Ana Maria Braga, Debby Lagranha, Emiliano Queiroz, Tadeu Mello, and Guilherme Karan reprise their respective roles from the first film, joined by Luciano Szafir, Betty Lago, Vera Fischer, Deborah Secco, and Thiago Fragoso. In this sequel, Kira (Xuxa), the elf of light, is in charge of saving her friends and mankind from a curse that would petrify the hearts of lovers and end love on the face of the Earth.

The film was released in theatres on December 13, 2002. The film repeated the success of the previous and was watched by approximately 2,301,152 viewers, according to Ancine, and earned more than 11,486,623 Brazilian reals, becoming the fifth highest-grossing film of 2003 in Brazil. The accompanying soundtrack was released in January 2003.

== Plot ==
Kira (Xuxa Meneghel), the pixie of light, is back to face a new challenge. She senses that her friend, Nanda (Debby Lagranha), is in danger. Worried, call her and discover that Nanda and her cousins were attacked by a strange witch who came in search of her tears to perform a curse. Kira goes to meet the children. She tries to reassure them and meets Rafael (Luciano Szafir), Nanda's uncle. A climate emerges between the two, encouraged by children. In the wizarding world, the witches Bertilda (Cristina Pereira), Desdemona (Vic Militello), and Adastéia (Karen Acioly) make the spell capable of turning hearts in love with stones. Algaz (Betty Lago mother witch, appears and realizes that the curse is not working. She rages and says it will take a second special tear to complete the curse. Kira returns to the greenhouse and meets Cléo (Zilka Salaberry), her mentor in the human world. She needs to find out if love between two beings of different natures is possible. She decides to tell Zinga (Ana Maria Braga), the elf queen and her mother. In the way of the fairies, Kira knows the fairy Kin (Juliana Baroni) and, together, they face Téia, the witch who attacked Nanda. Kin faints, and Kira takes her to Fairyland. There she meets Queen Dara (Vera Fischer) and also Kaly (Zezé Motta). Kira finds out about the existence of a pink heart child, generated from the union between two different beings. The child is Ana, Nanda's friend, and her tear of fear completes the spell. The spell will take place on the next full moon and can only be undone in the Castle of the Witches. Unfortunately, fairies cannot enter the castle. Kira meets Mily (Cláudia Rodrigues), a fumbling little fairy. It ends up giving Kira the power to fly. Kira takes advantage and leaves for the witch's castle. The children and Rafael go to the greenhouse to find Kira. They find the Kuines and decide to go to the waterfall along with Chuchu (Luiz Carlos Tourinho) and Alface (Tadeu Mello), Kira's helpers. At the behest of Dara, Mily comes to the world of humans to ask for help from Raphael. Mily takes everyone to the magical world. The witches go to the mirror and discover that Rafael and the others are on the trail. Algaz appears and orders the pink-heart child to be captured so that the second tear is extracted. Epifania (Deborah Secco), a witch with no talent for evil, pays attention to what they say. She is the mother of Ana. Adastéia goes to the trail and catches Ana (Maria Mariana Azevedo). The spell of the fairy Mily ends, Kira falls, and she is imprisoned by a gigantic troll. Kira is saved from the clutches of the troll by Gorgon (Guilherme Karan), Raphael, and his group. They head towards the castle. Kira gets in, but her friends do not. Inside, she sees the torture that the witches do with Ana. The girl is trapped in a cage on the cauldron with the boiling potion. Kira tries to stop them but cannot. Rafael arrives and manages to save Kira with the help of Gorgon, the children, and the elf Dafnis, Ana's father. Kira and Rafael use the force of love and thus save Ana and win the witches. The castle is going to explode. Everyone needs to leave. Gorgon and the children are the first. The moment is tense; the castle explodes without Kira and Rafael leaving. Among the rubble are the two. Kira and Rafael seal their love with a kiss and, later, with a beautiful union ceremony in Faerie. Mika and Zinga are present, as well as all the other characters. Each character has his farewell story. Ana tries to see the future in a crystal ball. She sees the image of Kira, Rafael, and a child. They walk like the harbinger of a happy future.

== Cast ==
- Xuxa Meneghel as Kira / Elf of the Light
- Luciano Szafir as Rafael (Rafa)
- Deborah Secco as Epifânia
- Thiago Fragoso as Dáfnis
- Susana Vieira as Witch-Mór
- Betty Lago as Witch-Algaz
- Cristina Pereira as Witch-Desdêmona
- Vic Militello as Witch-Desdêmona
- Karen Acioly as Witch-Adastéia
- Debby Lagranha as Fernanda Maia (Nanda)
- Brunno Abrahão as Daniel (Dani)
- Ana Maria Braga as Queen Zinga
- Emiliano Queiroz as King Mika
- Vera Fischer as Queen Dara / Mother of fairies
- Zezé Motta as Prophesy Kálix
- Guilherme Karan as Gorgon
- Nathália Rodrigues as Fairy Light
- Juliana Baroni as Kin Fairy
- Cláudia Rodrigues as Milly Fairy
- Tadeu Mello as Alface
- Luiz Carlos Tourinho as Chuchu
- Zilka Salaberry as Cléo
- Gustavo Pereira as Lix / Duende do tempo
- David Brazil as Rodim / Duende Veloz
- Maria Mariana Azevedo as Ana
- Thainá Medeiros as Gabriela
- Adriana Bombom as Blue Fairy
- Ana Paula Almeida as Yellow fairy
- Monique Alfradique as Pink fairy
- Lana Rodes as Fairy Turquoise
- Daiane Amêndola as Red Fairy
- Gabriella Ferreira as Lilac fairy
- Joana Mineiro as Violet fairy
- Letícia Barros as Orange fairy
- Stephanie Lourenço as Green fairy
- Thalita Ribeiro as Fairy Pearl

== Background and development ==
After an attempt to produce a new children's film was completely abandoned because of problems with Globo Filmes, Xuxa starred in the Xuxa Popstar film, which was a box office hit. At the same time, he fulfilled a clause in his contract with Diler & Associados in which he should make two films aimed at the adolescent public and one for the children's public. And so, began to be sketched the new film project of the presenter.

Xuxa wanted to do something different from her two previous films in the cinema: Xuxa Requebra (1999) and Xuxa Popstar (2000). If in these feature films the idea was to bring Planeta Xuxa to the cinema, privileging the musical attractions to the detriment of history, then it was sought not only to create a more consistent plot, but to create an entire universe, which had its own rules.

In this way, Xuxa tried to follow the trend of the film market at the time: to bet on a fantastic story, mixing the real world with the magical world. However, rather than betting on the fantasy genre, Xuxa wanted something that represented her willingness to retell stories to children. The idea of creating a film based on Duende came after a controversial statement by the host. In all interviews, the singer was emphatic in claiming that she had seen goblins on two occasions. Xuxa said the Goblins used to show up in their room at night. Then, one of the elves (female, according to Xuxa) cried beside her bed, leading her to believe that she should feed them. The hostess then put food on the counter in the room where she puts the elves she wins, and then the apparitions stopped. "I put fruits, raisins," he said. "They're gone." The presenter's account is controversial in the media. It was then that its manager, Marlene Mattos, decided to take something beneficial from the situation and make a movie about Duendes.

The film production became the most viewed in the history of national cinema. Three weeks after it was released, the film had already been seen by more than 700,000 people. "Xuxa e os Duendes" was the most expensive film of the Xuxa (budget of 3.8 million). Diler Trindade's goal was to reach 2.5 million viewers and earn R $10 million. Diler's prediction was almost right: the movie grossed R $11,681,917.00.

== Production ==
Still in 2001, before the debut of the first film, Xuxa guaranteed the sequel of the story for 2002, "We already have the name: Xuxa and the Elves 2 - On the way of the fairies". said the presenter. "Xuxa and the Elves" was Xuxa's most expensive film with a budget of 3.8 million. however it was surpassed by its sequence Duendes 2, that had budget tripled in more of R$5 million of Brazilian real. After losing the highest-grossing Brazilian title to City of God (2002), after leading for three consecutive years, Xuxa wanted the film to have more focus on the plot and less stock-and-share actions of recording artists such as the previous ones, With the production of A Globo Filmes and the distribution Warner, partners of the project, they invested the greatest exposure to the film so that the presenter could return to the podium. Captured HD high-definition camera, the film benefited from post-production in the studios of Tele-Image. the effects director of Tele-Image, Marcelo Siqueira, emphasizes limitations of time and budget that prevented the work from reaching a more accurate result. "The film was made from August to now, we had only 40 studio days to do the post-production effects." In comparison, he says that Tele-Image, who did the same thing in Cacá Diegues' new film, had a much longer time for God Is Brazilian - at least seven months and a year and a half of preparations. Time and budget are restrictive factors that even the commitment and creativity can not compensate, at least in full, even more in a movie like this, full of effects. Siqueira and the owner of Tele-Image, Philippe Siaretta, even refer to the castle of the movie as "R$ 1.99" (Brazil) to highlight how much the lack of money was restrictive for them. Made to the touch of the box, with a $1 million budget (Brazil), Xuxa and the Goblins 2 would require double and even triple to come out with a target and also more post-production time, according to the producers.

For Marcelo Rezende from Folha, the concept of the film is a film that aims above all to be pleasant, and the scheme in which it was assembled is of an almost militant simplicity. The intention is to create a fable. A moral tale about diversity. The elf loves a man (common, as the movie shows), and the point is to show the children that all differences do not really make any difference. Children-the probability is at least reasonable-must understand this message, because it is repeated over and over again. Almost every sequence, in infinite ways. Didatism leads everything, sets the tone and the mark as Xuxa seeks to perfect herself in the image of perfect teacher. If in Xuxa and the Xuxa Elves already wanted to secure a cast with more professional actors and fewer celebrities and recording artists, in Duendes 2, Xuxa vetoed pop singers and other "celebrities", something that was common in Requebra and Popstar, by exigency of his former manager Marlene Mattos. In the cast are actors of the Brazilian dramaturgy like Vera Fischer, Zezé Motta, Betty Lago, Thiago Fragoso, Susana Vieira, Deborah Secco, interpreting the main characters. Debby Lagranha, Emiliano Queiroz, Tadeu melo, Guilherme Karan and Ana Maria Braga are the only actors of the previous film that remain in Duendes 2. there are not any romantic pair for Xuxa, in Duendes 2, the television presenter is a romantic couple. with Luciano Szafir with whom she was married and had a daughter, Sasha Meneghel.

Along with the previous Xuxa e os Duendes 2, he received accusations of plagiarism, has received accusations of plagiarism. Writer Ana Maria Salgado claimed that the scripts of the two films were inspired by her book, "Maria da Graça in: O Portal" (en: Maria da Graça in: The Portal). She filed a claim for compensation for moral and material damages in court over Xuxa Promotions and Artistic Productions, Marlene Mattos and Diler and Associates. The 17th Civil Chamber of the Rio de Janeiro Court of Justice ruled that the application was unfounded, based on the evidence that the defendants presented that two professional writers made the plot of the films, which was also supported by an expert. The judge stated that "the similarities are common in this literary type, that is, fairies with scepters or wands, evil witches who laugh and want to destroy the forces of good, the existence of magical portals, funny characters, etc. in the case of the films, the existence of elves that configure their main characters, which do not exist in the author's text".

=== Music ===
The soundtrack of the film of the same name, released in 2002 by Som Livre. The album consists of songs performed by the protagonist, presenter Xuxa Meneghel and other artists such as Deborah Blando, Thiago Fragoso, and Paulinho Moska. The soundtrack was released between 2002 and 2003 shortly after the release of the DVD movie. The only existing version has the simple DVD-like cover; the cover is all blue with film and CD credits and small cast photos as well as the back cover of the DVD.

== Release ==
Xuxa and the Elves 2, it was released on December 13, 2002, in more than 300 cinemas in Brazil, on December 7, 2002, premiered at the Villa Lobos Shopping Mall in São Paulo, which caused a great commotion among children and adults who waited for an autograph of Xuxa. Xuxa said that he wanted to debut Xuxa and El Duendes 2 in Latin America, as long as it was dubbed in Spanish. "I wish people would see that it was me that I was there."

The presenter said she believes in the existence of goblins. "It is ridiculous not to believe that there is a better world than the one we live in." Xuxa also spoke of the possibility of filming two new versions of Xuxa and the Elves. "We thought of making the film into four parts." But the new versions of the movie never happened.

== Critical reception ==
As well as the first sequel, Xuxa and the Elves 2 - On the way of the fairies received low acclaim from film criticism. Estadão website praised the technical part of the film "display a very appreciable care with the image." but it was negative in relation to the plot "formatted to house speeches full of good intentions about the right to differences and the value of love - they are about ten of each, at least - it continues to doubt the spectator's intelligence. so that the sense is clear." For critical Marcelo Hessel of the site Omelete, the film is the worst of the year, writing that "If the script already shows a little predictable, no problem: the basic function of the film is to teach friendship lessons in a way" If the original of 2001 had at least some technical quality, the continuation lacks visual and narrative defects, the stage set with cones, sparkles and smoke appears to be wrong. flying fairies seem to be taken from a junkyard commercial." He also criticized the fate of the amorous romance of the Epiphany witch and the Daphnis elf, defining it as "prejudiced," by "displaying the witch turned into a fairy." In other words, interracial love is acceptable as long as one side ignores their cultural heritage." and concluded that Xuxa and the Elves 2 is only a mockery of a funny joke. Faced with proper black humor, he laughed out loud. If it continues like this, the Queen children promises to invade another reign: it will compete with Ed Wood, the King Trash. Carla Nascimento writing for Folha, said that Xuxa returns to be the queen of the absurd, "Only a lot of courage explains the total absence of modesty to produce and sell a movie like "Xuxa and the Elves 2", which opens tomorrow in 300 rooms all over country. "Of course, such courage is driven by the market, which has accepted very well anything that bears the name of the" queen of the children"." For Rubens Ewald Filho from Uol, the film is "very bad", "Even High Definition (HDTV), has a grainy and poorly defined image (particularly in interior and night scenes). It has one of the most scandalous merchandisings in Film History Brazilian, who also has a sad past on the subject: not only an English school, but a cookie brand that is an entire and annoying commercial.And must have lacked money in production because everything is very ugly, art direction is horrible and very, very poor. (Look at the floor of the house of the witches, you can see the canvas badly adjusted.) The castle on fire seems something worthy of Ed Wood's tape".

Celso Sabadin from the Cineclick site. also made a negative reception about the film, for him "It is not possible, in a clear conscience, to call the products made by Xuxa "film"." stating that "Nothing she does is cinema, it's just a bunch of loose frames with the sole purposes of selling merchandising, promoting the "celebrities" of the moment, and making money. That is, a Xuxa film can not be considered a bad movie because basically it's not a movie, it's an immense commercial on the big screen and in the dark room, it's the life philosophy of the hostess who, as everyone knows, did not bear a daughter, but rather released a product on the market: Sasha. And if she does it with her own daughter, just imagine it with a movie." A critics of the Cineweb, website defined Xuxa and the Elves 2 "as an unfortunate sequence", and praised City of God for taking the leadership of Xuxa from Brazil's box office, because according to him "Brazilians shame" the problem for him is not in Xuxa starring in films but rather "the kind of films she makes." The productions starring Xuxa and his band are nothing more than a heap of ostentatious commercials of products (chocolate, biscuit and so on) and artists linked in some way to their empire - built on a systematic exploration of products, insistently advertised on television and sold to a huge mass of innocent children, daughters of uninformed parents, inattentive, or both." Lamenting that "Among the many attacks on intelligence and the aesthetic sense of the public, to adorn one of the most uncontested sex symbols of the country, Vera Fischer, under a weird make-up. For these and more, watching the film proves to be a more sadomasochistic experience than that of Dobby, the house elf of Harry Potter and the Chamber of Secrets, when he insists on self-flagellation, knocking himself on the walls and injuring himself" and ended up wishing that "Brazilian cinema produces more and better films, especially in the area of children and youth, and that self-esteem and the level of public demand rise to the same extent." Edinho Pasquale of DVD Magazine wrote, "The film is rough, with badly made cuts, a scenario that borders on ridicule, songs are few (still good) and the "special participation" of a constellation of actors of TV Globo, it does not make sense (some appear just to put the name on the credits). "He said he had never seen a makeup job" so badly done (Vera Fischer's can be even hilarious) and merchandising "Embedded in context") have become music video and movie scene!." Juliana Lima writing for Cinefilos said that like "Elves 1", the sequel has a "predictable plot and the good wins in the end. But that is not the film's biggest problem, which suffers from a forced dramatization and characters who celebrate everything at all times, which is slightly irritating", and finalized writing "that the film undoubtedly is a classic trash film that guarantees many laughs. Not for the bad jokes - which are saved only by the performance of prestigious figures such as Tadeu Mello and Cláudia Rodrigues - but for all the rest: the peculiar characterization of the characters, such as Vera Fischer's fairy queen; of special effects and scenarios that seem to be much older than they really are or the storyline itself."

== Box office ==
Sequencing a hit movie was a bold decision, even if the model was working very well, it could generate wear and tear on the public. Following the release of Xuxa Requebra (1999) the Brazilian box office in 2000 with more than 2 million viewers, Xuxa Popstar (2000) became the most watched film in Brazil in 2001, with more than 2,394,326 viewers, the first being a national film was the box office leader in the country in a decade. In 2001 Xuxa and the Elves (2001) reached more than 2.5 million spectators and became the most viewed production of the country, until being surpassed by City of God in November 2002, that reached 3 million spectators, the film by Fernando Meirelles took the children's queen from the leadership she was accustomed to occupy for three consecutive years. Duendes 2 was then released with the aim of returning the lead in theaters to Xuxa. Duendes 2 had more than 2,301,152 box office sold according to Ancine, the film reached fifth place among the highest grossing domestic films of 2003, being the first time in three years that Xuxa did not reach the lead. being the thirteenth most watched film of 2003 in Brazil, with a gross of more than 11,486,623.00.

== Home media ==
The DVD was released in June 2003, Authorized by TeleImagem, the DVD offers options to watch the movie with or without tags, through the Pan-Scan mode, in addition to WebDVD - with exclusive movie content for computer, games and wallpaper - and option of viewing angles, feature already used, unprecedented in Brazil, in the first "Xuxa and the Goblins". It also has "hidden" bonuses, making of, music videos and interviews with production and cast. Of the games available, there are those that can be played on both the DVD and computer. Edinho Pasquale from the DVD Magazine site, considered the DVD well done, but the product bad. It consutarou the image is reasonable, the sound good, has the good feature of if you choose which screen format you want to watch, but still does not compare to the quality of the DVD of the first movie. It deserved more than the minimum score (2 stars) for the "effort and good ideas of the DVD (Pan and Scan, Multiangles, Extras that can be seen during the film)". What many "blockbusters" do not have in the market. If you have (very) small children or are ardent fan of Xuxa, go ahead. If you want to watch an unpretentious movie, do not choose this one. Not even worth it. Read a good book on rainy days.

== Other media ==
BraSoft Studios, a national program developer and graduate of Globo Brands, has produced a videogame based on the film Xuxa and the Elves 2. On the basis of the film of the same name, the player controls the character Xuxa, which is a fairy. The game features 10 stages that follow the original script of the film.
