= Debby Lagranha =

- Born: Débora Cristina Lagranha; 3 October 1991 (age 34); São Paulo, SP, Brazil
- Education: Estácio de Sá University
- Occupations: Veterinarian; businesswoman
- Years active: 1997–2012
- Height: 1.70 m (5 ft 7 in)
- Spouse: Leandro Franco (m. 2013, divorced)

Débora Cristina Lagranha Franco (born October 3, 1991) better known as Debby Lagranha, is a veterinarian and Brazilian businesswoman. She began her career as an actress and television host, which she abandoned in 2012, graduating in veterinary medicine the next year and practising this profession ever since. She owns a kennel for rescued animals, and an animal lodging where owners can leave dogs and cats while they travel. In 2017, she opened the first pet supplementation company in Brazil.

== Acting career ==
Debby debuted on television in 1997 starred the hosted Clube da Criança, which had returned to the programming of the Network Manchete, in which it remained until the following year. At this time was confirmed like protagonist of the children's telenovela A Queridinha, however the work never got to be produced due to the financial crisis of the transmitter. In 1998 enters to the cast of the humorous sitcom A Turma do Didi, interpreting the personage of the same name by seven seasons, leaving it in 2004. In 2000 signed with the record label Eldorado to record his debut album, under the production of Luiz Macedo and with repertoire composed by Luiz Macedo, Fernando Salem and André Abujamra, however the record never came to be released. Between 2003 and 2004 also he was part of the team of the Xuxa in the Xuxa no Mundo da Imaginação, participating in the jokes and activities of the program, besides interpreting diverse personages in the pictures of children's stories. In 2005 it integrated the cast of the twelfth season of Malhação, interpreting the spoiled teenager and consumerist Taty. In 2008 she became a presenter of Fator X, a program focused on games and technology shown by TV Brasil in partnership with the Amazonian network Boas Novas. In 2011 she played her first adult character, Karen in A Vida da Gente, an ambitious woman who is interested in her best friend's brother. In 2012 made special participation in That Kiss, his last work in the television before moving of area.

In 2012 she ceased work as an actress, and the next year graduated in veterinary medicine, which she has practised since then. In the same year she opened a kennel to rescue abandoned animals. In addition she became the owner of a lodging for dogs and cats in Vargem Grande, where owners can leave animals while they travel. In 2017, she opened Brazil's first animal supplementation. In 2018 she was the veterinarian responsible for the animals of the telenovela Deus Salve o Rei.

== Personal life ==
In 2009 she began studying veterinary medicine at Estácio de Sá University. In the same year she began to date Leandro Franco, who was in the last year of the same course. At the end of 2012 she announced her pregnancy and, on April 26, 2013, married Leandro when seven months pregnant. On June 6, her first daughter, Maria Eduarda, was born. Despite the pregnancy, Debby did not interrupt her studies and continued college, graduating at the end of 2013.

== Filmography ==
Year	TV Show	Role	Notes
1997–98	Clube da Criança	Herself (host)	
1998–04	A Turma do Didi	Debby	Season 1–7
2003–04	Xuxa no Mundo da Imaginação	Various characters	
2005–06	Malhação	Tatyane (Taty)	Season 12
2008	War and Peace	Pâmela Peixoto Gonzales	Episode: "Delusions & Truths"
2008–09	Fator X	Herself (host)	
2011	A Vida da Gente	Karen	
2012	Aquele Beijo	Miss Candidate	Episode: "April 22, 2012"

=== Films ===
Year	Film	Character
1998	Simão, o Fantasma Trapalhão	Luísa
1999	O Trapalhão e a Luz Azul	Tuta / Pedrinha
2000	Xuxa Popstar	Debby
2001	Xuxa e os Duendes	Nanda
2002	Xuxa e os Duendes 2 - No Caminho das Fadas	Nanda
2003	Xuxa Abracadabra	Little Red Riding Hood
2004	Um Show de Verão	Laura

== Theatre appearances ==
Year	Production	Role
1997	Cantando Estórias com Cerelê e Relalá	Cerelê
1998	Respeitável Público	
1999	Um Castelo Bem Assombrado	
2000	Chapeuzinho Vermelho: O Musical	Little Red Riding Hood
2001	Viagem ao Mundo Prateado	
2003	A Dama e o Vagabundo	Dama
2004–05	Adolescente Faz Cada Uma	Alicia
2005–06	O Mistério do Fantasma Assustado	
2007–08	ABC do Amor	
2011	O Diário de Débora	Débora
