= Xuxa Abracadabra =

2003 film directed by Moacyr Góes

- Promotional poster
- Directed by: Moacyr Góes
- Written by: Flávio de Souza
- Produced by: Diler Trindade
- Starring: Xuxa Meneghel; Márcio Garcia; Cláudia Raia; Brunno Abrahão; Maria Mariana Azevedo; Heloísa Périssé; Leandro Hassum; Lúcio Mauro Filho; Sérgio Mamberti
- Cinematography: Ana Schlee
- Music by: Ary Sperling
- Production companies: Xuxa Produções; Diler & Associados; Globo Filmes; Warner Bros. Pictures
- Distributed by: Warner Bros. Pictures
- Release date: December 19, 2003
- Running time: 97 minutes
- Country: Brazil
- Language: Portuguese
- Budget: R$ 7 million
- Box office: R$ 11.6 million

Xuxa Abracadabra is a 2003 Brazilian fantasy adventure film produced by Diler Trindade and distributed by Warner Bros. Pictures and Globo Filmes. Directed by Moacyr Góes, it stars Xuxa Meneghel, Márcio Garcia, Cláudia Raia, Brunno Abrahão, Maria Mariana Azevedo, Heloísa Périssé, Leandro Hassum, Lúcio Mauro Filho, and Sérgio Mamberti. The film tells the story of a librarian named Sofia who agrees to babysit her friend Matheus's children. While looking after the children at Matheus's great uncle's house, they find a magical book that takes them to a fairy-tale land.

The film was developed as a children's film focusing on fairy tales and folklore, a departure from the teen-focused projects Meneghel usually produced and starred in. The screenplay was written by Flávio de Souza, who added several characters from children's stories into the film.

The film premiered on December 18, 2003, and grossed 11 million reais upon wide release in Brazil. Xuxa Abracadabra received negative reviews from critics, but was considered an improvement in quality compared to other films involving Meneghel.

== Plot ==
One Saturday night, children's librarian Sofia (Xuxa Meneghel) is getting ready to go out with her best friend (Heloísa Périssé) when she gets a phone call from Matheus (Márcio Garcia), the widower of a cousin she was close to. Matheus asks Sofia to babysit his children, Júlia (Maria Mariana Azevedo) and Lucas (Brunno Abrahão). Sofia agrees, because not only does she adore Matheus's children, she is secretly in love with him.

Sofia meets the children at Matheus's great-uncle's house. His great uncle Nicolau (Sérgio Mamberti) is an astronomer and sorcerer who owns a magical book. Upon opening it, Sophie and the two children fall into it, landing in the Enchanted Forest where all fairy tales happen. While in the Enchanted Forest, Sofia, Júlia, and Lucas meet fairy-tale characters such as Snow White (Talita Castro), her stepmother the Evil Queen (Cláudia Raia), and Prince Charming (Cláudio Heinrich). They also meet Saci (Toni Garrido), Little Red Riding Hood (Debby Lagranha), and the Big Bad Wolf (Lucio Mauro Filho), among other fairy-tale characters. Because Sofia and the children are from the real world, the fairy-tale characters dislike their presence. Monsters from horror stories appear and plan to invade the Enchanted Forest, conquer it, and eventually invade the real world.

The monsters attack, and Sofia saves Júlia and Lucas. The group then find their way back to the real world, to get the help of Uncle Nicolau to seal the monsters in their fairy-tale world.

== Cast ==
- Xuxa Meneghel as Sofia
- Márcio Garcia as Mateus
- Cláudia Raia as the Evil Queen
- Brunno Abrahão as Lucas
- Maria Mariana Azevedo as Júlia
- Heloísa Périssé as Patrícia
- Leandro Hassum as Bluebeard / The Frog Prince
- Bruna Marquezine as Maria
- Ademir Rocha as João
- Talita Castro as Snow White
- Cláudio Heinrich as Prince Charming
- Debby Lagranha as Little Red Riding Hood
- Kayky Brito as Puss in Boots
- Lúcio Mauro Filho as Big Bad Wolf
- Sérgio Mamberti as Uncle Nicolau (Uncle Nick) / Magical Merlino
- Tom Cavalcante as the Storyteller
- Eva Todor as the Grandmother
- Cristina Pereira as Little Red Riding Hood's mother
- Luís Salem as the Magic Mirror
- Toni Garrido as Saci
- Gustavo Pereira as Pinocchio
- Pietro Mário as Pintor
- Marcelo Torreão as the Huntsman
- Gustavo Ottoni as Pirata Caolho
- Nilvan Santos as Pirata
- Fabiricio Poilido as Zombie
- Gabriel Jacques as Vampire
- Robetinho Martinelli as Mummy
- Rafael Senna as Frankenstein
- Gaspar Filho as Cyclop
- Rouge as Themselves

== Production ==
Xuxa had found previous success with the film Xuxa e os Duendes, which was popular amongst young children, despite being targeted towards teenagers. Xuxa Abracadabra was devised to be the opposite; a film targeted at young children that still retained appeal for teenagers.

Production began when producer Diler Trindade brought the screenplay from Flávio de Souza. Moacyr Góes was chosen as director, and was challenged to escape the "caricature" tone usually seen in Brazilian children's productions. Góes says that when he accepted Trindade's invitation to direct the film, he started to study cinema intensely, watching productions with a variety of tones. "In 2002, I saw about 800 films, from Eisenstein to 'Clueless'."

The main characters were cast, with Heloísa Périssé (Patricia), Brunno Abrahão (Lucas), Maria Mariana Azevedo (Júlia), Debby Lagranha (Little Red Riding Hood), Kayky Brito (Puss in Boots) and Leandro Hassum (Bluebeard / The Frog Prince) being brought onto the film. The character Mateus, played by Marcio Garcia, was the romantic interest of Xuxa's character in the film, Luciano Szafir was initially cast to play Mateus, but was dropped due to concerns that viewers would be confused; Szafir had played Xuxa's romantic interest in Xuxa e os Duendes 2. Musical group Rouge made a guest appearance in the film, shown at a nightclub in one scene, filmed in Rio de Janeiro. Recording of the film began in September 2003 and lasted four weeks.

== Release ==
The premiere of the film occurred on December 12, 2003, at the Parque Mundo Xuxa, in the SP Market Shopping Center, in the South Zone of São Paulo.

Fans of Xuxa Meneghel's caused a stampede trying to see her, which left a young woman injured after she fell and was trampled upon. The young woman suffered a twist in her right knee, was rescued by the local fire department, and sent to the Pedreira hospital. The premiere in Rio de Janeiro occurred on December 15, 2003, and Xuxa did not attend. The film was released on December 19, 2003.

As the film's release, Xuxa posed with the cast of the film on Angra dos Reis Island, for Caras magazine. While there, Xuxa fell and injured her leg while taking pictures with fans. She was taken in her private helicopter to the hospital Copa D'Or, and received 11 stitches in her leg. Xuxa attended the Domingão do Faustão on December 14, 2003. to give a press conference about the release of the film.

=== Home media ===
The production was recorded and released on VHS and DVD, by Warner Home Video.

== Reception ==
=== Critical reception ===
Like previous Xuxa films, Abracadabra received negative reviews from critics but was rated better than previous films. Marcelo Forlani of Omelete was critical of the production, saying that it was "once again hastily done, without any concern for pre-production. Characters are free of any three-dimensional depth, and there is a total absence of coherence". He also criticized the team responsible for makeup in Abracadabra, saying that "The beard of the pirate Bluebeard is more false than a note of R$13.50 reais, the monsters wear costumes that seem to have been rented, and worst of all, the color of the fake nose used by Claudia Raia when she becomes the Evil Queen is quite different from her skin". concluding that the "film only proves how much the Brazilian people still need to grow culturally".

Writing for Epipoca, Rubens Ewald Filho considered the film "less execrable than the others", and that "The film was made in a hurry, with little money and relative commitment, and the set design is very bad". He added that "The dialogue is extremely bad and bland. There are a few amusing phrases from Claudia Raia, in the role of Snow White's Stepmother, which at least has a few moments of brilliance, the rest falls in the common grave."

Writing for ISTOÉ, Mariane Morisawa praised the quality of the film, writing that "The film is not good enough to be Shrek, which played very cleverly with fairy-tales, but represents a breakthrough for Xuxa. It is better than Xuxa e os Duendes 2". Similarly, a critic from Estadão, praised the film and considered it superior in relation to Xuxa's previous one, writing that "Xuxa is more beautiful in Abracadabra than in Duendes 2, the effects of the film are more carefully done". Audiences surveyed by AdoroCinema gave the film a three-star rating out of five, audiences surveyed by IMDb gave a score of 1.8 stars to the film, and audiences surveyed for Filmow gave a score of 1.8 stars to the film, based on 2793 votes.

=== Box office ===
The budget for Xuxa Abracadabra was between R$5 and R$7 million reais, using than R$2 million reais for advertising. This made Xuxa Abracadabra Xuxa's highest-budget film. Xuxa Abracadabra was released in 300 cinemas in Brazil, and was the most watched film on its release weekend, beating Disney's Brother Bear for top box office ranking nationally. It was watched by 161,527 people and grossed 2,193,188 Reals at the box office on its first weekend. The film grossed a total of 11,677,129 reals, and was the fourth most-watched national film in Brazil in 2004.

== See also ==
- List of Brazilian films of the 2000s
