= Xuxa e os Duendes =

2001 film by Paulo Sérgio de Almeida and Rogério Gomes

- Promotional poster
- Directed by: Paulo Sérgio de Almeida; Rogério Gomes
- Written by: Vivian Perl; Wagner de Assis
- Produced by: Diler Trindade; Marlene Mattos
- Starring: Xuxa; Gugu Liberato; Guilherme Karan; Debby Lagranha; Angélica; Wanessa Camargo; Leonardo Cordonis; Ana Maria Braga; Emiliano Queiroz; Luciana Gimenez
- Cinematography: Cezar Moraes
- Edited by: João Paulo Carvalho
- Music by: Ary Sperling
- Production companies: Globo Filmes; Warner Bros. Pictures; Diler & Associados; TeleImage; Xuxa Produções
- Distributed by: Warner Bros. Pictures
- Release date: December 14, 2001
- Running time: 90 minutes
- Country: Brazil
- Language: Portuguese
- Budget: R$ 3.8 million
- Box office: R$ 11.6 million

Xuxa e os Duendes (English: Xuxa and the Elves) is a 2001 Brazilian fantasy musical adventure children's film directed by Paulo Sérgio de Almeida, Rogério Gomes and Márcio Vito with a screenplay by Vivian Perl and Wagner de Assis. Based on personal experiences lived by Brazilian TV host Xuxa Meneghel. It contains in his cast Xuxa Meneghel, Guilherme Karan, Debby Lagranha, Leonardo Cordonis, Gugu Liberato, Ana Maria Braga, Emiliano Queiroz, Angélica, Wanessa Camargo.

The kingdom of the elves is celebrating the delivery of the responsibility of taking care of the nature to the prince Damiz. But villain Gorgon holds the little elf on the wall of Little Girl Nanda's room and convinces his partner, Rico, to buy the girl's house and take "progress" to the forest. Kira will have the mission to free the stuck imprisoned in the wall and save Earth.

The film was produced by Diler Trindade with co-production by Globo Filmes and Warner Bros., and was released in theaters on December 14, 2001. The film was watched by approximately 2,657,091 box office according to Ancine, and earned more than 11 million Brazilian reals for its producers. As was already common in other Xuxa films, Duendes was received with suspicion by specialized critics. However, all were unanimous in saying that they represented a breakthrough in comparison with the previous ones. Praising the end of over-merchandising, but criticizing the film's script for being "unstable, with weak performances," an extremely childish script and incoherent dialogues. Writing "Duendes" is a change, has cliches in tons, but for Xuxa, who did everything a little on the screens, this is no problem and that the film was produced just to please its audience, in this case a multitude of children.

The success of the film led Xuxa to create a sequel titled Xuxa e os Duendes 2: No Caminho das Fadas, released the following year.

== Plot ==
Kira (Xuxa) is a botanist who has strange gifts, such as talking to plants and making others sneeze. She can not remember her past, and she lives in a greenhouse with her fumbling Tomate (Luciano Huck) and Alface (Tadeu Mello). Kira, unknowingly, is the Duende of Light, daughter of Mika (Emiliano Queiroz) and Zinga (Ana Maria Braga), the kings of the elves. His brother, Damiz (Leonardo Cordonis), the Friendship Goblin, was kidnapped by a Gorgon (Guilherme Karan), the greatest enemy of the race, being trapped on the wall of Nanda's (Debby Lagranha) bedroom, a 10-year-old girl, Kira's friend. His parents are experiencing financial difficulties and then decide to sell the house and move. Only Nanda is suffering because she does not want to leave and leave her new friend Damiz alone. Rico (Gugu Liberato) is a businessman manipulated by Gorgon, the Goblin of Envy, who has been expelled from the world of elementals as a traitor, and now lives in the form of a human being. Rico only thinks about destroying nature and money, due to the negative energy of Gorgon, who forces him to buy the house of Jessica and Otavio, parents of Nanda, and demolish it. Gorgon knows that Damiz is trapped there and that near the house lies the magical gateway to the kingdom of the fairies. Demolishing the house, Gorgon will destroy Damiz and all elemental beings.

Meanwhile, Queen Zinga and King Mika use all their resources to rescue their son. The sovereigns seek help from Morgan, the fairy queen, who sends the fairies Mel (Wanessa Camargo) and Melissa (Angélica), to look for Damiz. They soon know Kira and discover the villains of Gorgon, but they can not intercede, because the power of him is stronger, and they end up captured with Rodin (David Brazil), the swift goblin. Now, the mission to free Damiz will be on Kira's, who will discover secrets.

== Cast ==
- Xuxa Meneghel as Kira
- Debby Lagranha as Fernanda Maia (Nanda)
- Guilherme Karan as Gorgon / Pixie of Envy
- Leonardo Cordonis as Damiz / Friendship Elf
- Emiliano Queiroz as King Mika
- Ana Maria Braga as Queen Zinga
- Gugu Liberato as Rico
- Luciano Huck as Tomate
- Tadeu Mello as Alface
- Angélica as Fairy Melissa
- Wanessa Camargo as Honey Mel
- David Brazil as Rodim / Speedy Duende
- Luciana Gimenez as Morgana / Queen of the Fairies
- Carlos Gregório as Otávio Maia
- Cláudia Alencar Jéssica Maia
- André Valli as Sage Goblin
- Guilherme Vieira as Zaki
- Zilka Salaberry as Cleo
- Carlinhos Brown as Pixie Musician
- Theo Becker as Elf
- Adriana Bombom as Blue Fairy
- Ana Paula Almeida as Yellow Fairy
- Monique Alfradique as Fada Rosa
- Lana Rhodes as Turquoise Fairy
- Daiane Amêndola as Red Fairy
- Gabriella Ferreira as Lilac Fairy
- Joana Mineiro as Violet Fairy
- Letícia Barros as Fairy Orange
- Stephanie Lourenço as Green Fairy
- Thalita Ribeiro as Fairy Pearl

== Background and production ==
After an attempt to produce a new children's film was completely abandoned because of problems with Globo Filmes, Xuxa starred in the Xuxa Popstar film which was a box office hit. At the same time, he fulfilled a clause in his contract with Diler & Associados in which he should make two films aimed at the adolescent public and one for the children's public. And so, began to be sketched the new film project of the presenter.

Xuxa wanted to do something different from her two previous films in the cinema: Xuxa Requebra (1999) and Xuxa Popstar (2000). If in these feature films the idea was to bring Planeta Xuxa to the cinema, privileging the musical attractions to the detriment of history, in that it was sought not only to create a more consistent plot, but to create an entire universe, which had its own rules.

In this way, Xuxa tried to follow the trend of the film market at the time: to bet on a fantastic story, mixing the real world with the magical world. However, rather than betting on the fantasy genre, Xuxa wanted something that represented her willingness to retell stories to children. The idea of creating a film based on Duende came after a controversial statement by the host. In all interviews, the singer was emphatic in claiming that she had seen goblins on two occasions. Xuxa said the Goblins used to show up in their room at night. She told friends that the apparitions only ceased when one of the elves (female, according to Xuxa) cried beside her bed and she received the hint that she should feed them. The hostess then put food on the counter in the room where she puts the elves she wins. "I put fruits, raisins," he said. "They're gone." The presenter's account controversies in the media. It was then that its manager Marlene Mattos, decided to take something beneficial from the situation make a movie, about Duendes.

Since the film did not fit the musical attractions, the idea was to bring personalities (the vast majority of them non-actors) to the main roles. The meeting of the three Brazilian presenters - Xuxa, Angelica and Eliana: constantly called rivals, the presenters had shown on previous occasions that there was no hostility between them, like the launch of the Hopi Hari park in 1999. The idea was also show that peace in theaters. Angélica was invited by Xuxa and quickly confirmed her presence in the film. With Eliana the story was a bit different. Although declaring that she was flattered by the invitation, it was not authorized by the television network in which she worked at the time, Rede Record. The broadcaster's justification is that it was also linked to "Record Movies" and there was the project of a film for the presenter only. and their participation, could overshadow the project. The character that Eliana would do, Fada Mel, was then performed by singer Wanessa Camargo. With each new Xuxa film, the expectation was to know who the new show's heartthrob would be. After the singer Daniel, chosen through research with the public in Xuxa Requebra (1999) and Luigi Barichelli in Xuxa Popstar (2000), the idea was to maintain the standard of having a desired man of the time. The first named name was Rodrigo Santoro, Another speculated name was Reynaldo Gianecchini, Arriving near the beginning of the filming and in the face of the difficulty of finding the romantic pair, it was chosen to exclude the part of romance of the film. Gugu spoke in his Tititi magazine column, which had received the invitation a few days before and in less than 24 hours was reading the script, quickly accepting the proposal.

The character Gorgon, initially thought of the name of singer Fabio Jr to be the villain of the tape. The role was eventually interpreted by Guilherme Karan, reissuing the battle of good against the evil of Super Xuxa Contra Baixo Astral (1988). The other cast names, such as Leonardo Cordonis (Damiz), Queen Zinga (Ana Maria Braga) Fada Morgana (Luciana Gimenez). Alface (Tadeu Mello) and Nanda (Debby Lagranha), were apparently the first listed and accepted promptly.

== Post-production ==
=== Effects ===
In addition to the controversy over the elves made by the media and the casting of personalities for the cast, another highlight of Xuxa e os Duendes, was their pioneering technology. The Xuxa feature film was one of the first films in the world to use 24P Digital HD cameras, which had filming, editing and digital finishing, i.e. without using film. The rent of these two cameras cost R$275 thousand. At the time, George Lucas was using the same for the filming of Star Wars: Episode II – Attack of the Clones, which was to be released in 2002.

Diler Trindade, in testimony to the extras of the DVD of the film, informs that Duendes was the third film in the world to be launched with the digital technology. Marcelo Siqueira, of Teleimage, responsible for the special effects, specifies that the feature film was the first in Latin America. Due to the lack of knowledge of Brazilian technicians with the new technology, the production of the film brought the American Rafael Aladame, engineering director of Panavision, to make sure that the cameras were being used in the correct way. Currently, most films are made without film and using digital technology.

=== Music ===
Xuxa e os Duendes the soundtrack of the film of the same name, released in 2002 by Som Livre. The album consists of songs performed by the protagonist, the presenter Xuxa Meneghel and other artists. The soundtrack was released in early 2002, shortly after the release of the film on DVD. The soundtrack brings several artists such as Angelica, Carlinhos Brown, and Wanessa Camargo. The soundtrack was released in CD and cassette formats.

== Release ==
The film was first presented to the press on December 1, in addition to Xuxa, part of the cast was also on the spot. Presenters Luciano Huck, Gugu Liberato and Angelica, singer Wanessa Camargo and actors Guilherme Karan and David Brazil attended the production for the first time together with the guests and the press. Before beginning the session, actors, children and adults, dressed as goblins, made a brief staging on the theme of the film. During the show, the "elves" were scattered around the movie theater, giving a mood of magic to the preview. The premiere became a benefit, on December 13, 2001, in several cinemas in Brazil. With this attitude, Xuxa goes back to the tradition of helping the neediest in the launch of his films, as in A Princesa Xuxa e os Trapalhões (1989) - clothes and in Lua de Cristal (1990) - non-perishable food. With Duendes, the directors (Xuxa Producciones, Diler & Associados, Warner and Globo Filmes) and exhibitors (such as the UCI and Cinemark) gave up their profits, making 100% of the box office go to 20 charities, among they are: Association of Support to the Child against Cancer (São Paulo), Rio Cardiológica Infantil (Rio de Janeiro), Association Movimento Avante Lençóis (Bahia), Project Previdência (Minas Gerais), Assistance Association for the Deprived Child (Rio Grande do Sul), Child Support Group with Cancer (Sergipe) and Casa Sonhos de Criança (Maranhão). This action ended up bringing more than 30,000 people to theaters on December 13, 2001, raising R$120,000, an amount that was shared equally among all institutions. Xuxa e os Duendes entered December 14, 2001, in more than 200 rooms, across the country. It was planned to launch the film in Mexico, which for reasons unknown, did not occur.

== Reception ==
=== Critical reception ===
As was already common in other Xuxa films, Duendes was received with suspicion by specialized critics. However, everyone was unanimous in saying that it represented a breakthrough in comparison with the previous ones. Marcelo Forlani, for Omelete site praised the end of excess merchandising, but criticized the film's script for being "fickle, with performances weaker than the Playboy jokes," an extremely screenplay infantilized and incoherent dialogues." Mario Sérgio Conti for Folha was even more severe in his analysis of the film, writing that the writers of the film Paulo Sergio Almeida and Rogério Gomes, are not authors, "are technical, The authors' film is a vehicle for a celebrities fake, for him "Xuxa and the Elves" is the expression of a worn, sad, solitary, childish, unidentified, schizophrenic, antifamily, insensitive, magical and materialistic woman". He also criticized Xuxa for "Little caring about the fate of the worker, who ends the film jobless and without having support." and to finish he again criticized the profile of the main character by preaching the belief in "nature and magic" but abandoned his real nature, the elf, to stay on earth. In this she mimics Xuxa, who abandoned human nature to become a commodity. Already the appeal to the belief in the magic has reason to be: the merchandise Xuxa operates the magic of transforming the dizzy tale of the diseased elf in a millionaire treasure." João Flávio Martinez from the Diário da Região website, wrote "that "Duendes" for a change, has clichés in tons, from the first to the last frame. But for Xuxa, who has done everything a little on the screens, this is no problem and that the film was produced just to please its audience, in this case, a multitude of children. For them, it's all right, as long as Xuxa and her non-actor basket court appear". Juliana Lima of the Cine Trash website also criticized "Xuxa e os Duendes", "In addition to the predictable storyline, the film features such a character characterization that it is comical, but it might be naïve to think that Luciano Huck, Gugu Liberato and Ana Maria Braga - both TV presenters - would do a good job as actors.While considering the non-Hollywood timeline and budget of the film, we can not ignore the bad special effects. Highlight the scene in which Kira speaks looking directly at the camera, at the audience, and asks them to clap their hands if they believe in magic, in a frustrated attempt to imitate Peter Pan."

=== Box office ===
Changing the film line was a bold decision, as this model was working very well. Returning quickly to the previous films: Xuxa Requebra (1999) was the record holder of Brazilian cinema (a period that began in 1995, with the film Carlota Joaquina, Princess of Brazil), with 2,074,461 spectators according to the website of Ancine - Agência Nacional do Cinema). Already Xuxa Popstar (2000) managed to go beyond. With a box office of 2,394,326, he was not only the record holder of Brazilian cinema, but by November 2001 he was the movie recorder considering all the 2001 films. That means he made more box office than films like Shrek, Castaway, The Mummy Returns and Jurassic Park 3 in Brazil. With Xuxa and the Elves, Xuxa's success solidified and she had definitely become the Queen of Brazilian Cinema. If there was any distrust on the part of the investors of the film that he would not work, since it had left the formula of success of the previous ones, she was soon dissipated by the overwhelming success of Duendes. Released in 300 rooms, on December 14, 2001, the film was viewed by 2,657,091 spectators, automatically becoming the record holder of the "return" of National Cinema. The record was only surpassed one year later by City of God, which reached 2,762,625. Xuxa received the commemorative plaque for having surpassed 2.5 million in the Planet Xuxa of the hands of Diler Trinity. Three weeks after it was released, the film had already been seen by more than 700,000 people. "Xuxa e os Duendes" was the most expensive film of the Xuxa (budget of 3.8 million). Diler Trindade's goal was to reach 2.5 million viewers and earn R $10 million. Diler's prediction was almost right: the movie grossed R $11,681,917.00.

== Home media ==
The movie was released on DVD and VHS by Warner Home Video on June 28, 2002, The DVD contains extras and is the first in Brazil with high definition that allows you to choose the screen format. The VHS also has extras, which is little used in Brazil. The press conference held at Unibanco Arteplex, at Shopping Frei Caneca, was attended by Danilo Moura, of TeleImage (company belonging to the Casablanca group), Brent Hieat, director of the adaptation of the film and its extras to the DVD, and Diler Trindade, producer of the film. According to Moura the intention was to make a DVD completely different from the market, putting everything that a disk has capacity. The images were taken in high definition, which allowed them to reach the disc with quality seven times higher than normal DVDs.

The user can enjoy three screen formats: full screen (Pan and scan), with Letterboxing, and Widescreen. The options are available not only to the movie but also to all the extras. The director of the DVD, Brent Hieat, said some scenes have already been recorded for multi-angle viewing. "By the way, the whole movie can be seen like that," Hieat said. Hieat began the project of the DVD during the filming Xuxa and the Goblins. He claimed to have used all his own technology and entertainment for the records; "is what makes the DVD revenge". There are also three games on the DVD. One can be used on the device itself. The others on the computer with DVD drive. Another novelty is the Easter Eggs (Read More), hidden bonuses for the user to look for the extra. This is a feature commonly used in the United States. Rubens Ewald Filho praised the quality of the DVD of the film, writing that "it is superior to the previous ones (films of the presenter). TV presenters as actors, in roles of even responsibility (none of them compromises, none however reveals itself) but criticized the fact that presenter Huck has partnered with Tadeu Mello "we were in a little mood. But if the digital effects are nice, the musical numbers are too fast." The script has no problem copying Peter Pan (the famous scene with Tinker Bell) and others (the grandmother telling the story to the grandson). Even Xuxa seems better treated and more at ease than in the previous films.

== Sequel ==
Xuxa e os Duendes has a sequel: Xuxa e os Duendes 2: No Caminho das Fadas (2002). That also received the same low acclaim from critics, However, he was also a big hit of box office.

== See also ==
- List of Brazilian films of 2001
