= Zilka Salaberry =

Brazilian actress

- Born: Zilka Nazareth de Carvalho; 31 May 1917; Rio de Janeiro, Brazil
- Died: 10 March 2005 (aged 87); Rio de Janeiro, Brazil
- Occupation: Actress
- Years active: 1936–2002
- Known for: Dona Benta; In Sítio do Picapau Amarelo

Zilka Nazareth de Carvalho (31 May 1917 – 10 March 2005) was a Brazilian actress who appeared in a variety of telenovelas. She was born and died in Rio de Janeiro, She also portrayed the character Dona Benta from the series Sítio do Picapau Amarelo.

== Filmography ==
=== Film ===
Year	Title	Role
1936	Cidade-Mulher	—N/a
1937	Casinha Pequena	—N/a
1940	Direito de Pecar	Iracema
1946	No Trampolim da Vida	—N/a
1958	Aguenta o Rojão	—N/a
1958	Matemática Zero, Amor dez	—N/a
1959	Maria 38	Eugênia
1965	Society em Baby-Doll	—N/a
1967	Na Mira do Assassino	Dona Rita
1970	Uma Garota em Maus Lençóis	—N/a
1971	O Barão Otelo no Barato dos Bilhões	Megera
2001	Xuxa e os Duendes	Cléo
2002	Xuxa e os Duendes 2 - No Caminho das Fadas	Cléo

=== Television ===
Year	Title	Role	Notes
1956	O Beijo nas Trevas	Nurse	
1956	Teatrinho Trol	Various characters	
1957	A Canção de Bernadete	—N/a	
1961	Pluft, o Fantasminha	Pandora	
1963	Pouco Amor não é Amor	—N/a	
1963	A Morta Sem Espelho	Lucrécia	
1964	O Acusador	—N/a	
1964	Sonho de Amor	Zizi Vasconcelos	
1964	Vitória	Rosália	
1965	Rosinha do Sobrado	Maria	
1965	Comédia Carioca	Alzira	
1967	A Rainha Louca	Marquesa Jazira	
1968	Sangue e Areia	Liana	
1969	A Ponte dos Suspiros	Clara	
1969	A Última Valsa	Lorena	
1969	Véu de Noiva	Aunt Cora	
1970	Irmãos Coragem	Sinhana Coragem	
1971	O Homem que Deve Morrer	Bárbara	
1971–1974	Caso Especial	Various characters	3 episodes
1972	O Bofe	Carlota Vidigal	
1973	O Bem-Amado	Donana Medrado	
1974	Supermanoela	Carolina	
1974	Corrida do Ouro	Kiki Vassourada	
1975	Senhora	Firmina Mascarenhas	
1975	Pluft, o Fantasminha	Pluft's mother	
1976	O Casarão	Mercedes	
1977–1986	Sítio do Picapau Amarelo	Dona Benta	
1983	Parabéns pra Você	Fortune Teller	
1984	Pirlimpimpim 2	Dona Benta	Globo children's special
1986	Memórias de um Gigolô	Bianca Perla	
1986	Cambalacho	Judge	Special participation
1987	O Outro	Cigana	
1988	Vale Tudo	Ruth	
1988	O Primo Basílio	Vitória Soares	
1988	Tarcísio & Glória	Dona Neném Silvestrini	
1989	Que Rei Sou Eu?	Gaby	
1989	Top Model	Dona Virgínia	
1990	Araponga	Dona Marocas	
1992	Xuxa Especial de Natal	Gipsy	End of year special
1992	Teresa Batista	Veneranda	
1995	Você Decide	—N/a	Episode: "Remédio Duvidoso"
1995	Engraçadinha... Seus Amores e Seus Pecados	Aunt Ceci	
1995	Irmãos Coragem	Coffee seller	
1997	Você Decide	Dona Carlotinha	Episode: "Estrada do Amanhã"
1997	Xuxa Especial - Luz da Paz	Miss	End of year special
1998	Corpo Dourado	Sister Celeste	
1998	Pecado Capital	Bá	
1998	Você Decide	—N/a	Episode: "Trabalho Escravo"
1999	Você Decide	—N/a	Episode: "Um Outro em Meu Lugar"
2000	Bambuluá	Fairy Godmother	
2000	Zorra Total	Santinha's mother	
2002	Esperança	Italian neighbor	Episode: "July 3rd"

== Stage ==
Year	Title	Role
1936	Deus	Madre Superiora
1936	O Palpite	—N/a
1950	Na Copa do Mundo	—N/a
1956	Os Dois Maridos de Madame	—N/a
1957	Being Julia	—N/a
1959	O Mambembe	—N/a
1959	O Cristo Proclamado	—N/a
1960	Com a Pulga Atrás da Orelha	—N/a
1960	O Velho Ciumento	—N/a
1961	O Médico Volante	—N/a
1961	Os Possessos	—N/a
1961	Os Ciúmes de Um Pedestre	—N/a
1962	Beijo no Asfalto	—N/a
1964	O Homem, a Besta e a Virtude	—N/a
1970	A Preguiça	—N/a
1970	Fim de Jogo	—N/a
1971	O Camarada Miussov	—N/a
1971	A Rainha do Fundo do Mar	—N/a
