= Guilherme Karan =

Brazilian actor (1957–2016)

- Born: Guilherme Pontes Karam; 8 October 1957; Rio de Janeiro, Brazil
- Died: 7 July 2016 (aged 58); Rio de Janeiro, Brazil
- Occupation: Actor
- Years active: 1978–2005

Guilherme Pontes Karam (8 October 1957 – 7 July 2016), best known as Guilherme Karan, was a Brazilian actor.

== Biography ==
He was son of the admiral and Minister of the Navy in the João Figueiredo government Alfredo Karam and Lydiane Pontes Karam. Most of his work is comic, and was once a member of the Brazilian TV Pirata comedy show, one of the greatest hits of humor, screened by Globo TV. His most prominent work on TV is Butler Porfírio in telenovela Meu Bem, Meu Mal.

=== Disease ===
On 29 April 2005, he was robbed in a taxi, with his purse stolen. Karam physically suffered nothing, but the taxi driver was killed by reacting. Apparently, since the time of the assault Karam began to manifest symptoms of Machado-Joseph disease, a degenerative syndrome, also known as spinocerebellar ataxia type 3, which compromises motor coordination and control over muscles. Forced to switch to a wheelchair to get around, he has since stayed away from the stage and television. According to his father, Alfredo Karam, who gave statements to the Rio newspaper Extra, he inherited the illness of his mother, who died due to this same genetic anomaly. The other three brothers of the actor have already presented the disease - two already died.

=== Death ===
The actor died on 7 July 2016, at the Naval Hospital Marcílio Dias, as a result of the Machado-Joseph syndrome. His body was buried in Cemitério de São João Batista.

== Works ==
=== Film ===
Year	Title	Role	Notes
1978	Tudo Bem		
1978	Pequenas Taras		
1978	O Grande Desbum		
1982	Luz Del Fuego	transforming singer	
1985	O Rei do Rio		
1986	The Man in the Black Cape	Flávio Cavalcanti	
1986	Rock Estrela	Rubinho	
1988	Super Xuxa contra Baixo Astral	Baixo-Astral	
1988	Moon over Parador	Forte	
1990	Stelinha	Hair stylist	
1990	Assim na Tela Como no Céu	Diabo	
1997	Bela Donna	Silva	
1981	Assim na Tela como no Céu		
1981	Obra do Destino		
1998	Bela Donna	Silva	
1998	Iremos a Beirute	Gibran	
2000	Vida E Obra de Ramiro Miguez		
2001	Xuxa e os Duendes	Gorgom	
2002	Xuxa e os Duendes 2 - No Caminho das Fadas	Gorgom	
2003	As Alegres Comadres	João Fausto	

=== Television ===
- 1984: Partido Alto - Políbio
- 1986: Tudo ou Nada (Manchete) - Jorjão
- 1986: Dona Beija (Manchete) - Hans Fucker
- 1987: Alta Estação - Renato
- 1988: Carmem (TV Manchete) - Trajano Paulo
- 1988-1990 TV Pirata - Various Characters
- 1990: Meu Bem, Meu Mal - Porfírio
- 1992: Perigosas Peruas - Hector
- 1995: Engraçadinha, seus amores e seus pecados - Ib Teixeira
- 1995: Explode Coração - Bebeto "A Jato"
- 1998: Hilda Furacão - João Dindim
- 1998: Pecado Capital - Jurandir
- 2001: O Clone - Raposão
- 2003: Sítio do Picapau Amarelo - Anibal
- 2005: América - Geraldito (final appearance)
