= Paulo Sérgio Almeida =

Brazilian film director (1945–2025)

Paulo Sérgio Almeida (April 28, 1945 – August 14, 2025) was a Brazilian film director and producer.

== Life and career ==
Almeida was born in Petrópolis, Rio de Janeiro on April 28, 1945. Throughout his career, he directed a number of feature films, including Xuxa e os Duendes (2001), and Unforgettable (2007).

Almeida died from complications of lung cancer on August 14, 2025, at the age of 80.
