= Um Show de Verão =

2004 film directed by Moacyr Góes

- Directed by: Moacyr Góes
- Written by: Flávio de Souza
- Produced by: Diler Trindade
- Starring: Angélica; Luciano Huck; Thiago Fragoso; Tonico Pereira; Letícia Colin
- Cinematography: Flávio Zangrandi
- Edited by: Aruanã Cavalleiro; João Paulo Carvalho; Rodrigo Lima
- Music by: Mú Carvalho
- Production companies: Diler & Associados; Xuxa Produçoes; TeleImage; Labo Cine; Quanta; Warner Bros. Pictures Brasil
- Distributed by: Warner Bros. Pictures Brasil
- Release date: 30 January 2004
- Running time: 97 minutes
- Country: Brazil
- Language: Portuguese

Um Show de Verão (English: A Summer Show) is a 2004 Brazilian comedy film directed by Moacyr Góes

== Plot ==
Andréa (Angelica) is a humble carrier of telemarketing. Her boyfriend, Fred (Thiago Fragoso), is a typical businessman's son who thinks he can do anything in life. He decides to turn his girlfriend into a successful singer, with the help of his friend Marcelo (Luciano Huck), who always dreamed of being a music producer. From there, Andrea and Marcelo are to live several adventures the world of music and show biz. Until one night, there is a passion between the two that can knock you out.

The film includes appearances by several Brazilian artists and bands such as Felix Da Housecat, Peter Sun, Gabriel o Pensador, Lulu Santos DJ Marlboro, Capital Inicial, and Detonautas, among others.

== Cast ==
- Angélica .... Andréa
- Luciano Huck .... Marcelo
- Thiago Fragoso .... Fred
- Tonico Pereira .... Mr. Cisco
- Letícia Colin ... sister Fred
- Viétia Zangrandi...Leide
- Márcia Cabrita .... Lupe
- Ingrid Guimarães .... Jaqueline
- José Mojica Marins (Zé do Caixão) .... Josefel
- Eliana Fonseca .... Mrs. Jacira
- Carol Castro .... Salete Keli
- Sérgio Hondjakoff .... Marcelo friend
- Cláudio Gabriel .... researcher
- Isio Ghelman .... father of Fred
- Malu Valle .... mother of Fred
- Debby Lagranha .... Laura
- Lui Mendes .... Jeandro
- Renata Pitanga .... Secretary of Jaqueline
- Leon Góes .... manager hellhole
- Carol Castro .... "Maid of Hellraiser"
- Íris Bustamante .... seller store
- Tony Tornado .... menacing
- Marcos Mion .... Welmer
- Dany Bananinha .... Monique
- Otavio Mesquita .... Pizza delivery
- Leon Góes .... Manager

== Soundtrack ==
1. Um Show de Verão - Angélica
2. Futuro Azul - Angélica
3. O Show Tem Que Continuar (tema instrumental)
4. Chega de Dogma - Lulu Santos
5. Do Seu Lado - Jota Quest
6. Amor Maior - Jota Quest
7. 220 Volts - Capital Inicial
8. Quatro Vezes Você - Capital Inicial
9. Incondicionalmente - Capital Inicial
10. Podes Crer - Cidade Negra
11. Cachimbo da Paz - Gabriel o Pensador
12. Ei, Peraê! - Detonautas
13. Não Sei Viver Sem Ter Você - CPM 22
14. Sessão da Tarde - Pedro Sol
15. Deixa Disso - Felipe Dylon
16. Cabeça de Cera - Superfly
17. Imperfeito - Superfly
18. Falsidade - MC Andinho
19. Eu Quero - DJ Marlboro
20. Quando Eles Dormem - Poesia de Gaia
21. Sonhos e Planos - CPM 22

== See also ==
- Brazilian cinema
