= Clube da Criança =

Brazilian television series

- Created by: Maurício Sherman
- Presented by: Xuxa Meneghel; Angélica; Mylla Christie; Patrícia Nogueira; Debby Lagranha
- Country of origin: Brazil
- Original language: Portuguese
- No. of seasons: 3

Production
- Running time: 3 hours

Original release
- Network: Rede Manchete
- Release: June 6, 1983 – August 14, 1998

Related
- Xou da Xuxa

Clube da Criança (transl. Children's Club) is a Brazilian children's television series that aired on Rede Manchete from June 6, 1983 to August 14, 1998.

The show aired from Monday to Sunday at 5:00 p.m. and Saturdays at 4:30 p.m. by mixing jokes with the audience, and featuring viewers' drawings and toy raffles.

== Background ==
In 1983, director Maurício Shermann, then hired from TV Band, decided to come up with an idea for a new children's TV series. Remembering the children's programmes he previously created, Shermann noted that all of them were hosted by a young female presenter. He decided to invite Xuxa Meneghel to present the show, and had a member of his team travel to Rio de Janeiro to ask her to accept the invite.

This attempt proved unsuccessful when Xuxa refused, and even Xuxa's mother, Alda, went to Mauricio directly, asking him for explanations about the invitation, which she suspected of the director's ulterior motives.

Two months after leaving Bandeirantes, Shermann moved to Manchete, a station where he also controlled a publishing house where Xuxa was often featured on the cover of the imprint's publications. The director tried again to convince the then model to present a children's programme. Surprised by the invitation, the model refused the invitation a second time, claiming that she was following an international career as a model and was not interested in the project. Mauricio then talked to footballer Pelé, who was in a relationship with Xuxa at the time, guaranteeing that she would accept the project. The first recording of the show took place two weeks later.

== Development ==
The programme premiered on June 6, 1983 at 5pm. Hosted by Xuxa, the show featured games, competitions and cartoons, and received guests. After Xuxa left for TV Globo in 1986, the show was canceled, and was replaced by Lupu Limpim Claplá Topô. It returned in October 1987, hosted by Angélica (as well as Xuxa, debuting in children's programmes), who was only 13 years old at the time. After the transfer of Angelica to SBT in 1993, the series was hosted by actress Mylla Christie. The following year, former Miss Patrícia Nogueira hosted the show, but due to lack of financial resources, she left the show in 1995. After two years off the air, the programme returned, this time hosted by Debby Lagranha. Due to the serious financial crisis at the series' transmitter, the program was canceled in 1998 and Lagranha moved to TV Globo. The program was created and directed by Maurício Sherman.

The most enduring feature of the programme when Xuxa was host were the toy raffles sponsored by Estrela. Children wrote letters in to the show asking to open one of the three boxes numbered that Xuxa showed on the programme. One boy who appeared on the show won the surprise toy that was inside the box he asked to open. In July 1985, Xuxa introduced two sketches on the Children's Club that would later become famous on Xou da Xuxa. The first, Madame Caxuxá, which was only shown on Saturdays, featured a blonde gypsy who made predictions for children, always teaching good manners and giving tips on health and education. In the second sketch, Vovuxa, Xuxa told stories with a moral lesson for children.

== See also ==
- Xuxa filmography
