= Globo Filmes =

Brazilian movie production company

- Type: Private
- Founded: 25 December 1998; 27 years ago
- Founder: Roberto Marinho
- Headquarters: Rio de Janeiro, RJ, Brazil,
- Area served: Brazil
- Owner: Grupo Globo
- Website: Official website

Globo Filmes is a Brazilian motion picture production company owned by Grupo Globo.

== History ==
It was founded in 1998 by Roberto Marinho. The films produced or co-produced by the company frequently obtain more than 90% of box office revenue in the Brazilian movie industry and more than 20% of the total market.

While Globo Filmes isn't responsible for distributing its own films, as a producing party in Brazil, it retains the leasing rights for film distribution of their properties in other platforms, such as television, streaming and home video. Most of its productions are distributed by local Brazilian partners, like Paris Filmes, Imagem Filmes, H2O Films, Califórnia Filmes, Imovision, Vitrine Filmes and Embaúba Filmes.

As of October 2017, it has produced 222 movies, and 17 are in production. In all, the films produced have reached around 70 million viewers in movie theaters and formed partnerships with more than 40 independent producers.

== Filmography ==
Globo Films partial filmography includes many contemporary Brazilian classic films, award winning titles, and Oscar nominations:

=== 1998-2009 ===
Year	English title	Original title	Director	Genre
1998		Simão, o Fantasma Trapalhão	Paulo Aragão	Comedy
1999	Orfeu		Cacá Diegues	Drama, Romance
1999		Zoando na TV	José Alvarenga Jr.	Comedy
1999		O Trapalhão e a Luz Azul	Paulo Aragão and Alexandre Boury	Comedy
2000	A Dog's Will	O Auto da Compadecida	Guel Arraes	Comedy
2000	Bossa Nova		Bruno Barreto	Romance
2001		Xuxa e os Duendes	Paulo Sérgio de Almeida and Rogério Gomes	Family Fantasy, Musical
2001		Caramuru - A Invenção do Brasil	Guel Arraes	Comedy
2001		A Partilha	Daniel Filho	Comedy
2002	City of God	Cidade de Deus	Fernando Meirelles	Drama, Crime
2002		Xuxa e os Duendes 2: No Caminho das Fadas	Paulo Sérgio de Almeida, Rogério Gomes, and Márcio Vito	Family Fantasy, Musical
2003	God is Brazilian	Deus é Brasileiro	Cacá Diegues	Comedy
2003	Carandiru		Héctor Babenco	Drama, Crime
2003	The Man Who Copied	O Homem que Copiava	Jorge Furtado	Drama, Crime
2003		Didi – O Cupido Trapalhão	Paulo Aragão and Alexandre Boury	Comedy, Romance
2003	Lisbela and the Prisioner	Lisbela e o Prisioneiro	Guel Arraes	Comedy
2003	The Middle of the World	O Caminho das Nuvens	Vincente Amorim	Drama
2003		Maria, Mãe do Filho de Deus	Moacyr Góes	Religious
2003		Os Normais - O Filme	José Alvarenga Jr.	Comedy
2003		Casseta & Planeta – A Taça do Mundo é Nossa	Lula Buarque	Comedy
2003		Acquária	Flávia Moraes	Sci-Fi
2003		Xuxa Abracadabra	Moacyr Góes	Family Fantasy
2004		Sexo, Amor e Traição	Jorge Fernando	Comedy
2004		Meu Tio Matou Um Cara	Jorge Furtado	Comedy
2004		Xuxa e o Tesouro da Cidade Perdida	Moacyr Góes	Family Fantasy
2004		A Dona da História	Valeria Sueli Costa Amorim	Romance
2004		Redentor	Cláudio Torres	Drama
2004	Olga		Jayme Monjardim	Drama
2004		Querido Estranho	Ricardo Pinto e Silva	Drama, Comedey
2004		Cazuza - O Tempo Não Para	Sandra Werneck and Walter Carvalho	Musical, Drama
2004		Viva Voz	Paulo Morelli	Comedy
2005		Tainá 2 - A Aventura Continua	Mauro Lima	Family Fantasy
2005	Romeo and Juliet Get Married	O Casamento de Romeu e Julieta	Bruno Barreto	Comedy
2005	The House of Sand	Casa de Areia	Andrucha Waddington	Drama
2005	Two Sons of Francisco	Dois Filhos de Francisco	Breno Silveira	Drama
2005		O Coronel e o Lobisomem	Maurício Farias	Comedy
2005		Vinícius	Miguel Faria Jr.	Documentary
2005		Xuxinha e Guto Contra os Monstros do Espaço	Moacyr Góes and Clewerson Saremba	Animation
2006		Didi – O Caçador de Tesouros	Marcus Figueiredo	Comedy
2006	If I Were You	Se Eu Fosse Você	Daniel Filho	Comedy
2006		Irma Vap - O Retorno	Carla Camurati	Comedy
2006		A Máquina	João Falcão	Romance
2006	Zuzu Angel		Sergio Rezende	Drama
2006		Anjos do Sol	Rudi Lagemann	Drama
2006		Casseta & Planeta - Seus Problemas Acabaram!	José Lavigne	Comedy
2006	The Greatest Love of All	O Maior Amor do Mundo	Cacá Diegues	Romance
2006		Muito Gelo e Dois Dedos D’água	Daniel Filho	Comedy
2006	The Year My Parents Went on Vacation	O Ano em que Meus Pais Saíram de Férias	Cao Hamburger	Drama
2006		Xuxa Gêmeas	Jorge Fernando	Family, Comedy
2006		O Cavaleiro Didi e a Princesa Lili	Marcus Figueiredo	Comedy
2007		A Grande Família - O Filme	Maurício Farias	Comedy
2007	The Ballroom	Chega de Saudade	Laís Bodanzky	Romance, Drama
2007		Pro Dia Nascer Feliz	João Jardim	Documentary
2007	Antônia		Tata Amaral	Musical, Drama
2007		Caixa Dois	Bruno Barreto	Comedy
2007	Ó Paí Ó		Monique Gardenberg	Drama
2007		Cartola - Música para os Olhos	Lírio Ferreira and Hilton Lacerda	Documentary
2007		Inesquecível	Paulo Sérgio de Almeida	Romance
2007		Não Por Acaso	Philippe Barcinski	Drama
2007		Saneamento Básico	Jorge Furtado	Comedy
2007		Primo Basílio	Daniel Filho	Drama
2007	City of Men	Cidade dos Homens	Paulo Morelli	Drama, Crime
2007		O Homem Que Desafiou o Diabo	Moacyr Góes	Comedy
2007	The Last Madness	Sem Controle	Cris D'amato	Drama
2007		Xuxa em Sonho de Menina	Rudi Lagemann	Family Fantasy
2007		Os Porralokinhas	Lui Farias	Family Fantasy
2008	My Name Ain't Johnny	Meu Nome Não É Johnny	Mauro Lima	Drama, Crime
2008	The Sign of the City	O Signo da Cidade	Carlos Alberto Riccelli	Drama
2008		Polaróides Urbanas	Miguel Falabella	Comedy
2008		Bodas de Papel	André Sturm	Romance
2008		O Guerreiro Didi e a Ninja Lili	Marcos Figueiredo	Comedy
2008		Era Uma Vez...	Breno Silveira	Drama, Romance
2008		Os Desafinados	Walter Lima Jr.	Musical
2008		Casa da Mãe Joana	Hugo Carvana	Comedy
2008		A Guerra dos Rocha	Jorge Fernando	Comedy
2008	Last Stop 174	Última Parada 174	Bruno Barreto	Drama, Crime
2008		Orquestra dos Meninos	Paulo Tiago	Musical, Drama
2008		Romance	Guel Arraes	Romance
2009		Alô, Alô, Terezinha!	Nelson Hoineff	Documentary
2009		A Mulher Invisível	Cláudio Torres	Comedy
2009		Divã	José Alvarenga Jr.	Comedy
2009		É Proibido Fumar	Anna Muylaert	Comedy
2009	If I Were You 2	Se Eu Fosse Você 2	Daniel Filho	Comedy
2009	Lula, Son of Brazil	Lula, O Filho Do Brasil	Fábio Barreto	Drama
2009		Os Normais 2 - A Noite Mais Maluca De Todas	José Alvarenga Jr.	Comedy
2009	Peacetime	Tempos de Paz	Daniel Filho	Drama
2009		Simonal - Ninguém Sabe o Duro que Dei	Cláudio Manoel	Documentary
2009	The Assailant	Besouro	João Daniel Tikhomiroff	Drama, Action
2009	Time of Fear	Salve Geral	Sérgio Rezende	Drama, Crime
2009		Verônica	Maurício Farias	Drama, Thriller
2009		Xuxa em O Mistério de Feiurinha	Tizuka Yamasaki	Family Fantasy

=== 2010-2019 ===
Year	English title	Original title	Director	Genre
2010	Chico Xavier		Daniel Filho	Religious
2010		Quincas Berro D'Água	Sérgio Machado	Comedy
2010		O Bem Amado	Guel Arraes	Comedy
2010		400 Contra 1 - Uma História do Crime Organizado	Caco Souza	Thriller, Crime
2010	5 X Favela	5x Favela - Agora por Nós Mesmos	Manaíra Carneiro, Wagner Novais, Rodrigo Felha, Cacau Amaral, Luciano Vidigal and Cadu Barcellos	Drama, Anthology
2010	Astral City: A Spititual Journey	Nosso Lar	Wagner de Assis	Religious
2010	Elite Squad: The Enemy Within	Tropa de Elite 2: o Inimigo agora É Outro	José Padilha	Crime, Drama
2010		Aparecida - O Milagre	Tizuka Yamasaki	Religious
2010	Upside Down	De Pernas Pro Ar	Roberto Santucci	Comedy
2011		Desenrola	Rosane Svartman	Comedy
2011		Brasil Animado	Mariana Caltabiano	Animated
2011	Bróder		Jefferson De	Drama
2011		Qualquer Gato Vira-Lata	Tomas Portella	Comedy
2011		Cilada.com	José Alvarenga Jr.	Comedy
2011		Não Se Preocupe, Nada Vai Dar Certo	Hugo Carvana	Comedy
2011	Federal Bank Heist	Assalto ao Banco Central	Marcos Paulo Simões	Thriller, Crime
2011	The Man from the Future	O Homem do Futuro	Claúdio Torres	Comedy, Sci-Fi
2011		Onde Está a Felicidade	Carlos Alberto Riccelli	Comedy
2011		Família Vende Tudo	Alain Fresnot	Comedy
2011	The Clown	O Palhaço	Selton Mello	Comedy
2011		Família Vende Tudo	Alain Fresnot	Comedy
2012		Reis e Ratos	Mauro Lima	Comedy
2012		As Aventuras de Agamenon	Victor Lopes	Comedy
2012	Billi Pig		José Eduardo Belmonte	Comedy
2012	Xingu		Cao Hamburger	Drama
2012	Artificial Paradises	Paraísos Artificiais	Marcos Prado	Drama
2012		E Aí... Comeu?	Felipe Joffily	Comedy
2012	Dirty Hearts	Corações Sujos	Vicente Amorim	Drama, Thriller
2012		O Diário de Tati	Mauro Farias	Comedy
2012		Totalmente Inocentes	Rodrigo Bittencourt	Comedy
2012		Até que a Sorte nos Separe	Roberto Santucci	Comedy
2012	Gonzaga	Gonzaga - de Pai pra Filho	Breno Silveira	Drama, Musical
2012		Os Penetras	Andrucha Waddington	Comedy
2012		De Pernas pro Ar 2	Roberto Santucci	Comedy
2013		Tainá - A Origem	Rosane Svartman	Family Fantasy
2013	Father's Chair	A Busca	Luciano Moura	Drama
2013		Vai que Dá Certo	Mauricio Farias	Comedy
2013		Giovanni Improtta	José Wilker	Comedy
2013	Brazilian Western	Faroeste Caboclo	René Sampaio	Western, Drama
2013		Minha Mãe é uma Peça - O Filme	André Pellenz	Comedy
2013		O Concurso	Pedro Vasconcellos	Comedy
2013	Reaching for the Moon	Flores Raras	Bruno Barreto	Drama, Romance
2013		A Casa da Mãe Joana 2	Hugo Carvana	Comedy
2013	The Dognapper	Mato sem Cachorro	Pedro Amorim	Comedy
2013	Time and the Wind	O Tempo e o Vento	Jayme Monjardim	Drama
2013		Serra Pelada	Heitor Dhalia	Drama
2013		Meu Passado Me Condena	Julia Rezende	Comedy
2013		Crô - O Filme	Bruno Barreto	Comedy
2013		Até que a Sorte nos Separe 2	Roberto Santucci	Comedy
2013	Worms	Minhocas	Paolo Conti and Arthur Nunes	Animation
2014		Confissões de Adolescente - O Filme	Daniel Filho	Comedy, Romance
2014		Muita Calma Nessa Hora 2	Felipe Joffily	Comedy
2014		S.O.S. Mulheres ao Mar	Cris D'Amato	Comedy
2014		Julio Sumiu	Roberto Berliner	Comedy
2014		Entre Nós	Paulo Morelli and Pedro Morelli	Drama
2014	Getúlio		João Jardim	Drama
2014		Confia em Mim	Michel Tikhomiroff	Thriller
2014		Os Homens São de Marte... e é pra lá que eu vou	Marcus Baldini	Comedy
2014		Setenta	Emilia Silveira	Documentary
2014		Tim Lopes - História de Arcanjo	Guilherme Azevedo	Documentary
2014	Brazil Red	Vermelho Brasil	Sylvain Archambault	Drama
2014	Amazon	Amazônia	Thierry Ragobert	Fantasy
2014		Na Quebrada	Fernando Grostein Andrade	Drama, Crime
2014	Tim Maia		Mauro Lima	Drama, Musical
2014		Irmã Dulce	Vicente Amorim	Religious
2014		Boa Sorte	Carolina Jabor	Drama
2014	Made in China		Estevão Ciavatta	Comedy
2014		A Noite da Virada	Fabio Mendonça	Comedy
2014		Os Caras de Pau em O Misterioso Roubo do Anel	Felipe Joffily	Comedy
2015		Loucas Pra Casar	Roberto Santucci	Comedy
2015		Meus Dois Amores	Luiz Henrique Rios	Comedy
2015		Entre Abelhas	Ian SBF	Drama
2015		Qualquer Gato Vira-Lata 2	Roberto Santucci and Marcelo Antunez	Comedy
2015		Meu Passado Me Condena 2	Júlia Rezende	Comedy
2015		Linda de Morrer	Cris D'Amato	Comedy
2015		Real Beleza	Jorge Furtado	Drama
2015	The Second Mother	Que Horas Ela Volta?	Anna Muylaert	Drama
2015		Pequeno Dicionário Amoroso 2	Sandra Werneck	Romance
2015		S.O.S. Mulheres ao Mar 2	Chris D'Amato	Comedy
2015		Operações Especiais	Tomás Portella	Thriller, Crime
2015		A Floresta Que se Move	Vinicius Coimbra	Drama
2015		Betinho - A Esperança Equilibrista	Victor Lopes	Documentary
2015		Chico: Artista Brasileiro	Miguel Faria Jr.	Documentary
2015		Cinco Vezes Chico - O Velho E Sua Gente	Ana Rieper, Eduardo Goldenstein, Gustavo Spolidoro, Camilo Cavalcante and Eduardo Nunes	Documentary
2015		Até Que A Sorte Nos Separe 3: A Falência Final	Roberto Santucci and Marcelo Antunez	Comedy
2016		Vai que Dá Certo 2	Maurício Farias and Calvito Leal	Comedy
2016		Um Suburbano Sortudo	Roberto Santucci	Comedy
2016		Reza a Lenda	Homero Olivetto	Thriller
2016		Amor em Sampa	Carlos Alberto Ricceli	Romance
2016	My Hindu Friend	Meu Amigo Hindu	Héctor Babenco	Drama
2016		De Onde Eu Te Vejo	Luiz Villaça	Comedy
2016		Mundo Cão	Marcos Jorge	Thriller
2016		O Escaravelho do Diabo	Carlo Milani	Thriller
2016		Em Nome da Lei	Sérgio Rezende	Thriller
2016		Prova de Coragem	Roberto Gervitz	Drama
2016		Meu Nome é Jacque	Angela Zoé	Documentary
2016		Brasil: DNA África	Carlos Alberto Jr	Documentary
2016		Menino 23	Belisario Franca	Documentary
2016		A Corrida do Doping	Paulo Markun	Documentary
2016	Stronger than the World	Mais Forte que o Mundo - A História de José Aldo	Afonso Poyart	Drama, Sports
2016		Miller & Fried: as origens do país do futebol	Luiz Ferraz	Sports
2016		Baía dos Pesadelos	Alexandre Bouchet	Documentary
2016		Vidas Partidas	Marcos Schechtman	Drama
2016		Um Namorado Para Minha Mulher	Júlia Rezende	Comedy
2016	Aquarius		Kleber Menonça Filho	Drama
2016		Marginal	Alex Miranda	Documentary
2016		Um Homem Só	Claudia Jouvin	Comedy, Romance
2016		É Fada	Cris D'Amato	Comedy
2016		O Shaolin do Sertão	Halder Gomes	Comedy
2016		Curumim - O Homem Que Queria Voar	Marcos Prado	Documentary
2016		Através da Sombra	Walter Lima Jr.	Horror
2016	Under Pressure	Sob Pressão	Andrucha Waddington	Drama
2016	Elis		Hugo Prata	Drama, Musical
2016		O Filho Eterno	Paulo Machline	Drama
2016		Magal e os Formigas	Newton Cannito	Comedy
2016		Minha Mãe É Uma Peça 2	César Rodrigues	Comedy
2017		Os Saltimbancos Trapalhões: Rumo a Hollywood	João Daniel Tikhomiroff	Comedy
2017		Os Penetras 2 – Quem Dá Mais?	Andrucha Waddington	Comedy
2017		Redemoinho	José Luiz Villamarim	Drama
2017	El Revenge	La Vingança	Fernando Fraiha	Comedy
2017		Galeria F	Emilia Silveira	Documentary
2017	Pitanga		Beto Brant and Camila Pitanga	Documentary
2017		Belo Monte – Um Mundo Onde Tudo É Possível	Alexandre Bouchet	Documentary
2017		A Glória e a Graça	Flávio Ramos Tambellini	Drama
2017		Um Tio Quase Perfeito	Pedro Antonio	Comedy
2017		As Aventuras do Pequeno Colombo	Rodrigo Gava	Animation
2017		D.P.A. - O Filme	André Pellenz	Family Fantasy
2017	The Movie of My Life	O Filme da Minha Vida	Selton Mello	Drama
2017		Malasartes e o Duelo com a Morte	Paulo Morelli	Comedy
2017		Intolerância.doc	Susanna Lira	Documentary
2017		João, O Maestro	Mauro Lima	Drama
2017	Just Like Our Parents	Como Nossos Pais	Laís Bodanzky	Drama
2017		Duas de Mim	Cininha de Paula	Comedy
2017		Chocante	Jonhy Araújo and Gustavo Bonafé	Comedy
2017		A Comédia Divina	Toni Venturi	Comedy
2017		Entre Irmãs	Breno Silveira	Drama
2017		Vazante	Daniela Thomas	Drama
2017		Para além da curva da estrada	Guilherme Azevedo	Documentary
2017		Aqualoucos	Victor Ribeiro	Documentary
2017	Gabeira		Moacyr Góes	Documentary
2017	Don't Swallow My Heart, Alligator Girl!	Não Devore Meu Coração	Felipe Bragança	Drama
2017		Altas Expectativas	Álvaro Campos and Pedro Antônio Paes	Comedy
2017		Silêncio no Estúdio	Emilia Silveira	Documentary
2017		Coragem! As Muitas Vidas do Cardeal Paulo Evaristo Arns	Ricardo Carvalho	Documentary
2017		Santo Amaro Era Skatista	Felipe Martins	Documentary
2017		Fala Sério, Mãe!	Pedro Vasconcelos	Comedy
2017		Encantados	Tizuka Yamasaki	Religious
2018		Garimpeiros do Voto	Ernesto Rodrigues	Documentary
2018	Letters to a Book Thief	Cartas Para Um Ladrão de Livros	Caio Cavechini and Carlos Juliano Barros	Documentary
2018		Pra Ficar na História	Boca Migotto	Documentary
2018		A Imagem da Tolerância	Paula Trabulsi and Joana Mariani	Documentary
2018		Rio do Medo	Ernesto Rodrigues	Documentary
2018		Surf no Alemão	Cleber Alves and Eduardo "BR" Dorneles	Documentary
2018		Os Farofeiros	Roberto Santucci	Comedy
2018	Liquid Truth	Aos Teus Olhos	Carolina Jabor	Drama
2018		Quase Memória	Ruy Guerra	Drama
2018		Pagliacci	Chico Gomes and Júlio Hey	Documentary
2018		Todos Os Paulos Do Mundo	Gustavo Ribeiro and Rodrigo de Oliveira	Documentary
2018		Teu Mundo Não Cabe nos Meus Olhos	Paulo Nascimento	Drama
2018		Antes que Eu me Esqueça	Tiago Arakilian	Drama
2018		Não Se Aceitam Devoluções	André Moraes	Comedy
2018	Good Manners	As Boas Maneiras	Juliana Rojas and Marco Dutra	Drama, Horror
2018	Tungsten	Tungstênio	Heitor Dhalia	Thriller
2018		Mulheres Alteradas	Luis Pinheiro	Comedy
2018		Uma Quase Dupla	Marcus Baldini	Comedy
2018		O Nome da Morte	Henrique Goldman	Drama
2018	Dear Ambassador	Querido Embaixador	Luiz Fernando Goulart	Drama
2018		Abrindo o Armário	Darío Menezes and Luís Abramo	Documentary
2018		Crô em Família	Cininha de Paula	Comedy
2018		Ferrugem	Aly Muritiba	Drama
2018		O Paciente - O Caso Tancredo Neves	Sérgio Rezende	Drama
2018		10 Segundos Para Vencer	José Alvarenga Júnior	Drama, Sports
2018		Tudo por um Popstar	Bruno Garotti	Comedy
2018		A Última Abolição	Alice Gomes	Documentary
2018		Chacrinha: O Velho Guerreiro	Andrucha Waddington	Drama
2018	The Great Mystical Circus	O Grande Circo Místico	Cacá Diegues	Drama
2018		Sequestro Relâmpago	Tata Amaral	Thriller
2018		SLAM - Voz de Levante	Tatiana Lohmann and Roberta Estrela D'Alva	Documentary
2018		Henfil	Angela Zoé	Documentary
2018		Rasga Coração	Jorge Furtado	Drama
2018	Intimate Strangers	Intimidade entre Estranhos	José Alvarenga Jr.	Romance
2018		D.P.A. 2 - O Mistério Italiano	Vivianne Jundi	Family Fantasy
2018		Minha Vida em Marte	Susana Garcia	Comedy
2019		De Pernas pro Ar 3	Julia Rezende	Comedy
2019		Fevereiros	Marcio Debellian	Documentary
2019		Minha Fama de Mau	Lui Farias	Drama, Musical
2019		Sai de Baixo - O Filme	Cris D'amato	Comedy
2019		Cine Holliúdy 2: A Chibata Sideral	Halder Gomes	Comedy
2019		Albatroz	Daniel Augusto	Thriller
2019		Tá Rindo de Quê? - Humor e Ditadura	Alê Braga, Álvaro Campos and Cláudio Manoel	Documentary
2019		Mussum - Um Filme do Cacildis	Susanna Lira	Documentary
2019		Marcia Haydée - Uma Vida pela Dança	Daniela Kallmann	Documentary
2019		Espero Tua (Re)volta	Eliza Capai	Documentary
2019	Bacurau		Kleber Mendonça Filho and Juliano Dornellas	Drama, Western
2019	Divine Love	Divino Amor	Gabriel Mascaro	Drama
2019	Unremember	Deslembro	Flavia Castro	Drama
2019		Morto Não Fala	Dennison Ramalho	Thriller, Horror
2019		O Juízo	Andrucha Waddington	Drama
2019	Babenco: Tell Me When I Die	Babenco - Alguém Tem que Ouvir o Coração e Dizer: Parou	Bárbara Paz	Documentary
2019		O Amor Dá Trabalho	Alê McHaddo	Romance
2019		Maria do Caritó	João Paulo Jabur	Comedy
2019	Hebe	Hebe: A Estrela do Brasil	Maurício Farias	Drama
2019		Simonal	Leonardo Domingues	Musical
2019		Carcereiros - O Filme	José Eduardo Belmonte	Thriller, Crime
2019		Turma da Mônica: Laços	Daniel Rezende	Family
2019		Ela Disse, Ele Disse	Cláudia Castro	Comedy
2019		Vai que Cola 2 – O Começo	César Rodrigues	Comedy
2019		Os Parças 2	Cris D'Amato	Comedy
2019		Minha Mãe É uma Peça 3	Susana Garcia	Comedy
2019		Correndo Atrás	Jefferson De	Comedy

=== 2020-present ===
Years	English title	Original title	Director	Genre
2020		A Divisão	Vicente Amorim	Thriller, Crime
2020		De Perto Ela Não É Normal	Cininha de Paula	Comedy
2020		Breve Miragem de Sol	Eryk Rocha	Drama
2020		Barretão	Marcelo Santiago	Documentary
2020	Three Summers	Três Verões	Sandra Kogut	Drama
2020		Não Vamos Pagar Nada	João Fonseca	Comedy
2020		Verlust	Esmir Filho	Drama
2020		Macabro	Marcos Prado	Thriller
2020		Boca de Ouro	Daniel Filho	Thriller
2020		Terapia do Medo	Roberto Moreira	Thriller
2021		Um Tio Quase Perfeito 2	Pedro Antônio	Comedy
2021		Atravessa a Vida	João Jardim	Documentary
2021		Dente por Dente	Júlio Taubkin and Pedro Arantes	Thriller
2021		Depois a Louca Sou Eu	Júlia Rezende	Comedy
2021		Lucicreide Vai pra Marte	Rodrigo César	Comedy
2021		O Auto da Boa Mentira	José Eduardo Belmonte	Comedy
2021		Amigas de Sorte	Homero Olivetto	Comedy
2021		Nazinha, Olhai por Nós	Belisario Franca	Documentary
2021		Libelu - Abaixo a Ditadura	Diógenes Muniz	Documentary
2021		Cine Marrocos	Ricardo Calil	Documentary
2021		Loop	Bruno Bini	Thriller, Sci-Fi
2021		4 x 100 - Correndo por um Sonho	Tomas Portella	Drama, Sports
2021		Veneza	Miguel Falabella	Drama
2021		Doutor Gama	Jeferson De	Drama
2021		Dois Mais Dois	Marcelo Saback	Comedy
2021		L.O.C.A.	Claudia Jouvin	Comedy
2021		45 do Segundo Tempo	Luiz Villaça	Comedy
2021		Homem Onça	Vinícius Reis	Drama
2021		O Silêncio da Chuva	Daniel Filho	Thriller
2021		Bravos Valentes - Vaqueiros do Brasil	Ralf Tambke	Documentary
2021		Um Casal Inseparável	Sergio Goldenberg	Comedy
2021		O Jardim Secreto de Mariana	Sérgio Rezende	Drama
2021	Marighella		Wagner Moura	Drama
2021		Pixinguinha, Um Homem Carinhoso	Allan Fiterman and Denise Saraceni	Musical, Drama
2021		Galeria Futuro	Fernando Sanches and Afonso Poyart	Comedy
2021		Turma da Mônica: Lições	Daniel Rezende	Family
2022		Eduardo e Mônica	René Sampaio	Romance
2022		Juntos e Enrolados	Eduardo Vaisman and Rodrigo Van Der Put	Comedy
2022		Tô Ryca 2	Pedro Antônio	Comedy
2022		Medida Provisória	Lázaro Ramos	Drama
2022		D. P. A. 3 - Uma Aventura no Fim do Mundo	Mauro Lima	Family Fantasy
2022		As Verdades	José Eduardo Belmonte	Drama
2022		O Palestrante	Marcelo Antunez	Comedy
2022		Bem-vinda a Quixeramobim	Halder Gomes	Comedy
2022		O Amor Dá Voltas	Marcos Bernstein	Romance
2023	Perlimps		Alê Abreu	Animation
2023		Capitu e o Capítulo	Júlio Bressane	Drama
2024	Noah's Ark	A Arca de Noé	Sérgio Machado	Animation
2026		O Gênio do Crime	Lipe Binder	Mystery, Adventure, Family
