= Xuxa Popstar =

2000 film directed by Paulo Sérgio de Almeida, Tizuka Yamasaki

- Theatrical release poster
- Directed by: Paulo Sérgio de Almeida; Tizuka Yamasaki
- Written by: Elizeu Ewald; Vivian Perl; Wagner de Assis
- Produced by: Diler Trindade
- Starring: Xuxa Meneghel; Luigi Baricelli; Marcos Frota; Deborah Blando; Sílvia Pfeifer
- Cinematography: Ana Schlee
- Edited by: Diana Vasconcellos; João Paulo Carvalho
- Music by: Deborah Blando; Mu Carvalho; Maurício Manieri
- Production companies: Globo Filmes; Xuxa Produções; Warner Bros.
- Distributed by: Warner Bros.
- Release date: 15 December 2000 (Brazil)
- Running time: 86 minutes
- Country: Brazil
- Language: Portuguese
- Budget: R$ 2.8 million
- Box office: R$ 9.6 million

Xuxa Popstar is a 2000 Brazilian musical romantic comedy film directed by Paulo Sérgio de Almeida and Tizuka Yamasaki with screenplay by Vivian Perl and Wagner de Assis. The cast includes Xuxa Meneghel, Luigi Baricelli, Marcos Frota and Sílvia Pfeifer, as well as musical numbers with Os Travessos, KLB and Deborah Blando.

Popstar was co-produced by Warner Bros. and was released theatrically on 15 December 2000. The feature was watched by approximately 2,394,326 viewers.

== Plot ==
After a brilliant career abroad, an international top model named Nick (Xuxa Meneghel) returns to Brazil to find her Prince Charming, whom she met through an Internet chat. In the country, she becomes a successful businesswoman of fashion, but her competitor does everything to disrupt the girl.

== Cast ==
- Xuxa Meneghel as Nicole Vegas (Nick)
- Luigi Baricelli as Ricardo / Ray of Light
- Marcos Frota as João Pedro (JP)
- Cláudia Rodrigues as Mari
- Sílvia Pfeifer as Vani
- Cláudio Corrêa e Castro as Olímpio
- Luís Salém as Cicinho
- Deborah Blando as Mel
- Isabelle Drummond as Juju
- Brunno Abrahão as Lipe
- Leonardo Netto as Vitinho
- Gianne Albertoni as herself
- Leonardo as Dado
- André Bankoff as Felipe
- Sheila Mello as herself
- Andréa Veiga as Andréa
- Renata Pitanga as Renata
- Anna Paula Almeida as Aninha
- Adriana Bombom as Candy
- Daiane Amêndola as Dai
- Harmonia do Samba as themselves
- Scheila Carvalho as herself
- Otávio Mesquita as himself
- Alexandre Pires as himself
- KLB as themselves
- SNZ as themselves
- Os Travessos as themselves

== Production and concept ==
After a successful film for the teen audience, Xuxa planned to do something for children. In Xuxa Kid, Xuxa would become a 10-year-old girl, similar to what would happen years later in Xuxa em Sonho de Menina (2007). In the story, the young version of the presenter would have the duo Sandy and Junior as their friends. The recordings were planned for September and would be released in December.

However, Globo Filmes decided to veto the participation of the pair because there were already plans to launch a film with the brothers as protagonists, a fact that only came to fruition in 2003. Because of this decision, the story of the film had to be completely changed and the launch of a new film was delayed until March 2001.

After the project was canceled, Xuxa was persuaded by her team to make a new film, with a new script, that would rekindle her teen audience, as well as the previous one, and that the idea for a movie for the children's audience would be for next year. His manager then had the idea of making a film that could put musical attractions, just like in the previous one, to attract the adolescent public, that accompanied Xuxa in its TV series Planeta Xuxa. "In some cases it was possible to sew the musical appearance in the plot, but many entries were due to the invitation made by Marlene in the middle of filming," says screenwriter Vivian Perl. Diler Andrade defines the insertions of musical numbers (in a non-musical film) as a "strategic marriage" between the cinematographic and phonographic industry. "We need to repeat the feat of the music industry, which holds 80% of the market, against 20% of foreign artists. Vivian Perl says that Xuxa manager Marlene Mattos put the musical number on the film after conducting research on the most popular groups. The recordings began in September 2000.

According to the presenter, the film recounts a little of the story she lived when she spent three months in the United States early in her modeling career. "It is very difficult to face the lack of your country. We miss everything and have an hour that feels like coming back," he said. But it was not only this aspect that Xuxa wanted to show with the film. According to her the intention was to show the glamor that exists in the profession, but at the same time, get very close to reality by showing the difficulties of the career. "I wanted to gather some of the glamorous life that everyone wants with the difficulties that exist to achieve that dream," he said. According to the presenter, being a model, actress and soccer player is the dream of most children. The deduction came from a research in which the production took as a base to realize the film.

Xuxa said that the film is not necessarily for the children's audience, but for the family, The team's great pride, according to Xuxa, was to make a film "that brings an important message to children". "We did a research and found that boys want to be football players and girls, models, models and singers. I think it's important that they know that it takes a lot of head not to fall on the bad side of the profession, that has drugs, prostitution."

The film does not escape the standard of the cinematographic productions of Xuxa, There are no missing musical numbers - which, many times, arise without connection with the plot - and very, merchandising. the groups Harmonia do Samba, As Meninas, Os Travessos, KLB, SNZ and É o Tchan: and the singers Deborah Blando and Mauricio Manieri participated in the film. With little script and excesses, the film has excessive merchandising of brands of companies, or recording artists. In the interview, Xuxa, moved, thanks the artists who participated in the movie "without charging money", just for the good will to be in the film. The film also has unusual appearances by presenter Otávio Mesquita, singer Leonardo and model Gianne Albertoni. Also present are Sílvia Pfeifer, Claudia Rodrigues and veteran Claudio Corrêa e Castro. According to Vivian Perl, who wrote the story in partnership with Elizeu Ewald, the musical number serves to "illustrate a moment of introspection" of the protagonist.

The actors Thiago Lacerda, Marcello Antony and Reynaldo Gianecchini were invited to interpret Ricardo the romantic pair of Xuxa in the film, but neither one of them could accept, and the pepel ended up being interpreted by Luigi Baricelli. The scene of the kiss between Nick and Ray of Light was repeated dozens of times. The interpretation was so intense that at that time some tabloids even published that there was no technical kiss and that Xuxa and Luigi Baricelli would have a love relationship. The two even denied the relationship, but the Xuxa confirmed that the kiss was not technical.

== Music ==
Unlike the film previous, Popstar did not have its soundtrack released on CD or any other format. However, a promotional album was released by Abril Music with 3 songs that were present in the movie: O Rodo (Harmonia do Samba), Seamisai (Deborah Blando) and the theme song Popstar (Maurício Manieri).

- Popstar - Maurício Manieri
- Não Olhe Assim - Leonardo
- Shake, Shake - Xuxa
- Bate Tchan - É o Tchan!
- O Rodo - Harmonia do Samba
- Tô Te Filmando - Os Travessos
- Um Dia Pra Nós - Os Travessos
- Ela Não Está Aqui - KLB
- Tapa Aqui, Descobre Ali - As Meninas
- Seamisai - Deborah Blando
- Venha Dançar - SNZ
- Mais e Mais - Marcos Chadler

== Release ==
Xuxa promoted a press conference in São Paulo to publicize the film in which he stated that he hoped so as "Requebra was a box office record. I'm sure the same will happen with Popstar." The film was released on 15 December 2000, TV Globo reserved four rooms of a movie complex in Rio for the exhibition, on 6 January 2001, of Popstar. Officials of the station were invited to occupy the audience in exchange for food that was ceded to NGOs.

== Critical reception ==
Xuxa Popstar received generally negative from critics. Marcelo Forlani wrote in his website Omelette critique: "In the summer of 1999/2000, Xuxa Requebra obtained the highest grossing of national productions, betting on the same formulation that the Children's Queen decided to put a new product in theaters, yes, because this feature does not have a screenplay and only serves as a huge shelf where the new goods of the brand Xuxa are exposed ... An abuse to the spectator's intelligence and to the good taste, so much the face of stick like everything is shown, always in the foreground, leaving the characters themselves in secondary positions ... From the "drafting of the script" to its completion, it was only a few weeks ago, but there are no excuses for the lack of creativity presented.

The critic Celso Sabadin wrote that "Pop Star can not be considered a bad movie. Even because it's not a movie. It's just a bunch of music video made for popular groups. Between one video and another, one tries to tell a story. Just try. You never can. The basic proposal is clear: make money. Nothing else.

== Box office ==
Xuxa popstar in less than a month had already been seen by more than 1 million people. The film led the ranking of audiences in Brazilian cinemas in 2001, after 40 weeks of the debut of "Popstar". Despite not leading the top-grossing list of the year, the children's queen continued in front of all of the super-productions of the summer with several viewers. Xuxa Popstar was assisted by more than 2.38 million people. The national film was the great Brazilian box-office champion in 2001. Xuxa Popstar took 2.3 million viewers to cinemas, surpassing the previous year's mark of the children's queen, when Xuxa Requebra (1999) was seen by about 2 million people. The closest competitor to "Popstar" is The Mummy Returns, which was watched by 2.26 million Brazilians. The film became the Brazilian record-breaking movie, for the first time in more than a decade, a Brazilian film ended the year as the box office champion in the country's cinemas.

Xuxa popstar had a budget of 2.8 million Brazilian reais, the largest for a Xuxa film, until the launch of Xuxa e os Duendes, which got 3.8 million reais in budget. The film grossed over 9 million Brazilian reais.

== See also ==
- List of Brazilian films of 2000
