= Luciano Huck =

Brazilian TV host and entrepreneur (born 1971)

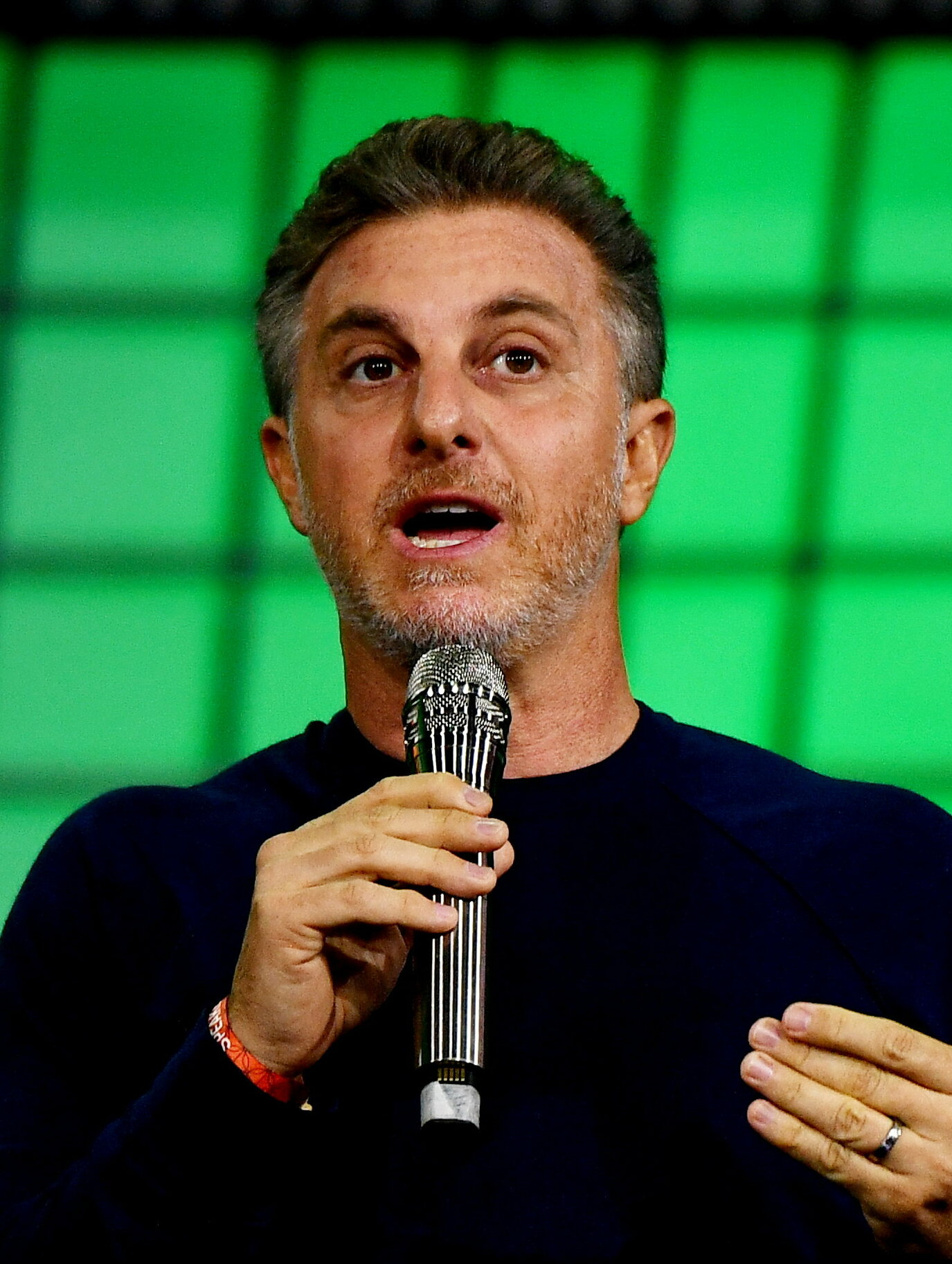
- Huck in 2023
- Born: Luciano Grostein Huck; 3 September 1971 (age 55); São Paulo, Brazil
- Years active: 1995–present
- Notable work: Programa H (1997–2000); Caldeirão do Huck (2000–2021); Domingão com Huck (2021–present)
- Spouse: Angélica (m. 2004)
- Children: 3
- Relatives: Fernando Grostein Andrade (half-brother)
- Website: Luciano Huck's official page

Luciano Grostein Huck (born 3 September 1971) is a Brazilian TV host and entrepreneur. From 2000 to 2021, he hosted the TV show Caldeirão do Huck, aired every Saturday on Brazilian network TV Globo, and also broadcast to 114 countries, via Globo International. In September 2021, Huck left his Saturday show to host Domingão com Huck (former Domingão do Faustão) on Sundays.

Huck is also the founder of Joá Investments, an investment fund focused on technology and lifestyle start-up companies, that only makes partnerships with companies committed with sustainability and with the preservation of the environment. Among Joá's investments, there are Cataratas, that focus on sustainable tourism, Tembici, a bike-sharing and bike-parking system, and also Agrade Investments, which works with start-ups in the United States.

Outside of entertainment and business, Huck has been involved in politics, and had been rumored to be a potential presidential candidate in 2022 election before choosing not to run. He has expressed interest in a possible presidential candidacy in 2026.

== Early life ==
Huck was born in São Paulo, the son of the lawyer Hermes Marcelo Huck and the urban planner Marta Dora Grostein, and half-brother of the film director Fernando Grostein Andrade. Huck is Jewish, being his maternal grandfather, Mauricio Grostein, native of the city of Ekaterinoslav, Soviet Union (currently Dnipro, Ukraine). He studied at the Law School of the University of São Paulo (USP).

He was an intern at Brazilian advertising agencies such as W/Brasil. At the same time, he opened Cabral, a nightclub in São Paulo.

His first direct connection with communication was as a writer at Jornal da Tarde newspaper in 1993. His job was to write a daily section called Circulando (Circulating), about youth behavior and entertainment. Huck also started working on a radio show aired by Rádio Jovem Pan.

Huck had his television debut in 1994 with a feature on TV show "Perfil" (Profile), presented by Otávio Mesquita. He was 24 when his newspaper page Circulando became a TV show under the same name, aired on network CNT Gazeta.

== Career ==
=== Television ===
In September 1996, Huck made his solo debut with Programa H on Rede Bandeirantes. Luciano Huck was also the host of radio show Torpedo on Rádio Jovem Pan. At 27, Huck left the newspaper to work full-time on Programa H. Luciano Huck joined Globo network in September 1999, to host Caldeirão do Huck. His program combines entertainment and charity work. On April 8, 2018, Caldeirão do Huck celebrated its eighteenth year on air.

In June 2021, it was announced that Huck would move to Sundays in September 2021, with a new show replacing the long-running Domingão do Faustão after Fausto Silva's departure from the network. Domingão com Huck premiered on September 5, 2021.

=== Social entrepreneurship ===
Luciano Huck is the founder and chairman of Instituto Criar, a non-profit organization whose mission is to promote youth professional, social and personal development by teaching them means of filmmaking. Over 2000 youth have enrolled in its educational program since it was established in 2004. He is also member of the civic movements Agora! and RenovaBR.

== Political activities ==
There were talks that Huck would run for president in the 2018 Brazilian general election. The presenter declined the offer but said he would keep "discussing important issues for Brazil". Polling at one point in the race showed that he would have been among the top three most popular candidates.

He was also speculated to be a candidate in the 2022 election, but ultimately chose not to run. Following the 2022 election, Huck has indicated he may be a presidential candidate in the future, with a possible run in 2026.

=== Political views ===
Huck has been described as the face of the Agora! political movement. Huck vowed to never vote for the Workers' Party (PT), breaking with the movement's reluctant support for Fernando Haddad's campaign against Jair Bolsonaro in the second round of the election. He ultimately voted for Jair Bolsonaro in the second round of the election.

Huck was critical of Bolsonaro's presidency, accusing Bolsonaro of 'inciting violence against women'.

In 2026, messages obtained by Policia Federal shows that Luciano had a good friendship with Daniel Vorcaro, who made the biggest bank fraud in Brazilian history.

== Personal life ==
Luciano Huck is married to the Brazilian television presenter, actress and singer Angélica Ksyvickis. They are parents of Joaquim, (born on March 8, 2005) Benício, (born on November 3, 2007) and Eva (born on September 25, 2012).

In May 2015, Huck, his wife and his three children were lightly injured after the plane they were travelling on crashed in the Pantanal region of the state of Mato Grosso do Sul.

== Filmography ==
=== Television ===
Year	Title	Character	Note	TV channel
1995	Circulando	Columnist / Presenter		CNT Gazeta
1996–2000	Programa H	Presenter		Rede Bandeirantes
2000–2021	Caldeirão do Huck	Presenter		Rede Globo
2004	Cabocla	Xexeú	Special guest	Rede Globo
2004	Quebrando a Rotina	Presenter		Rede Globo
2008	Beleza Pura	Himself	Special Guest	Rede Globo
2009	Geral.com	Himself	Season 2	Rede Globo
2010	As Cariocas	Augusto César	Episode: "A Traída da Barra" (Season 1, Episode 10)	Rede Globo
2011	Fina Estampa	Himself	Special Guest	Rede Globo
2012	Cheias de Charme	Himself	Special Guest	Rede Globo
2013	Amor à Vida	Himself	Special Guest	Rede Globo
2014	Now Generation	Himself	Special Guest	Rede Globo
2017–present	Quem quer ser um milionário?	Presenter		Rede Globo
2018	The Wall	Presenter		Rede Globo
2019	Amor de Mãe	Himself	Special Guest	Rede Globo
2021–present	Domingão com Huck	Presenter		Rede Globo
2022	Quanto Mais Vida, Melhor!	Himself	Special guest	Rede Globo
2022–present	Acredite Em Quem Quiser	Presenter	Local version of To Tell The Truth	Rede Globo
2023	Vai na Fé	Himself	Special Guest	Rede Globo
2024	Família é Tudo	Himself	Special Guest	Rede Globo

=== Film ===
Year	Title	Role
1999	Xuxa Requebra	Presenter
2001	Xuxa e os Duendes	Tomate
2004	Um Show de Verão	Marcelo
2005	Turma da Mônica em Cine Gibi	Himself
2009	Xuxa em O Mistério de Feiurinha	Rapunzel's prince
2010	Tangled	Flynn Rider (Brazilian dub)
2011	Breaking the Taboo	Himself
2014	Na Quebrada	Himself
2015	Até Que A Sorte Nos Separe 3: A Falência Final	Himself

== Awards ==
Huck received the Prêmio Extra de Televisão award for Best TV Host for 8 consecutive years (2013, 2012, 2011, 2010, 2009, 2008, 2007 and 2006), an accolade organized by Rio de Janeiro newspaper Extra, and it is similar to the People's Choice Awards.

Caldeirão do Huck also received the same award as Best Variety Show for 9 years (2011, 2010, 2009, 2008, 2007, 2006, 2005, 2004 and 2003), including an Outstanding Award for the feature Soletrando (a type of spelling bee) in 2007.
