= Angélica (television host) =

Brazilian television presenter

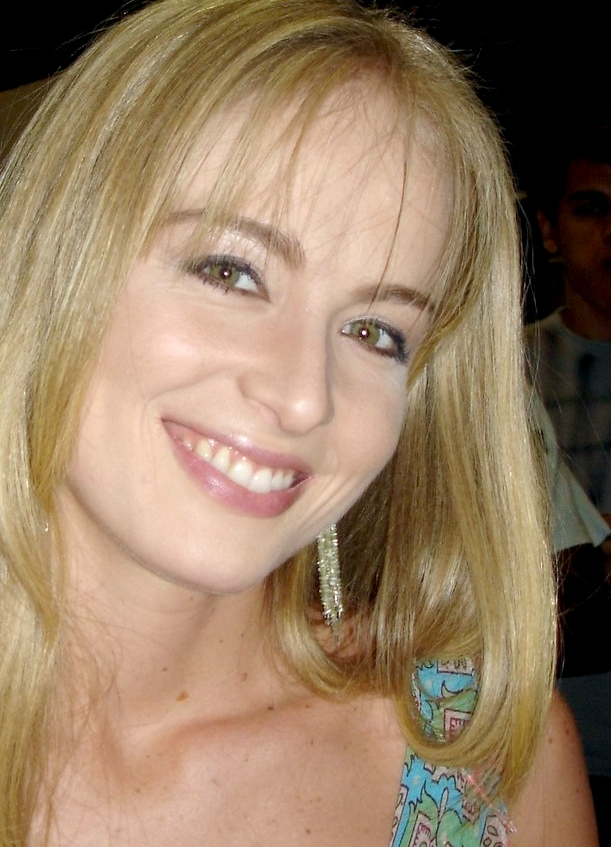
- Angélica in 2007
- Born: Angélica Ksyvickis; 30 November 1973 (age 52); Santo André, São Paulo, Brazil
- Occupations: TV host; actress; singer
- Years active: 1987–present
- Spouse: Luciano Huck (m. 2004)
- Children: 3
- Musical career
- Genres: Pop; children's music
- Instrument: Vocals
- Years active: 1988–present
- Labels: Universal Music Group; Epic Records; Columbia Records; CBS Records International
- Website: angelica.com.br

Angélica Ksyvickis (born 30 November 1973), known professionally by the mononym Angélica, is a Brazilian television host, actress, and former singer.

== Career ==
She started her career at 4, when she won a contest to choose Brazil's most beautiful child at a popular variety show presented by Chacrinha. At 13, she became famous for replacing Xuxa as the presenter of the kids show Clube da Criança (en:Kid's Club). Her popularity exploded when her hit single Vou de táxi ("I go by taxi", a remake of Joe le taxi, by French singer Vanessa Paradis) topped the Brazilian charts. Vou de táxi becoming a big hit has since become a classic, and is remembered by most of the Brazilian population, even though more than 20 years have lapsed since its release. Likewise, in 1991, her new album named "Angelica" increased her popularity with the song "Sweet cotton and Guarana". She also starred on the popular mini-series The Guarani.

Angélica has sold over 13 million copies of albums in which 13 of them were released between 1988 and 2001.

In 1993, she joined the second most popular channel in Brazil, SBT presenting the kids variety show "Casa da Angelica", which was a big hit. More popular than ever she also presented the popular teen game show "Passa ou Repassa" and " TV Animal".

In 1996 she signed a 7 years contract with Rede Globo to present her own show, Angélica (mostly known as Angel Mix, every weekday mornings, which was followed by "Caça Talentos", a soap opera starring her as Fada Bela. The ratings were robust, making Angélica even more famous than Xuxa; this was the first time any TV hostess had surpassed her in popularity. Sales of her merchandising and CDs were also huge.

But soon, after the initial boom, the ratings began to decline and she changed the format of the show several times. While in 1996 Angélica was unbeatable among kids, in 1997 she lost popularity to Chiquititas (that year, Angelica's album sold 300,000 copies vs. 800,000 copies by the Chiquititas cast), but she was still very popular until 1999. In 1998, she had 250 products linked to her name and made more money than Xuxa due to licensing (the Angélica shoes by Grendene sold over 1 million pairs in 5 months; in the same period her cereal sold over 7 million boxes and her nail polish sold 4 million). The success of her products was even more remarkable because unlike Eliana (3rd on the list) and Gugu Liberato (4th), she didn't promote her product-line during her show.

Finally, she decided to end her career as a child show hostess and, with only three months left for her contract with Globo to expire, she was chosen as the presenter for Video Game (game for teenagers), a five-minute segment on Vídeo Show. Video Game was a game-show whereby two celebrities would compete head-on throughout the entire week. The segment caused Video Show's ratings to double, and what was supposed to be a 2001 summer-only, 5 minute segment, became a 20-minute block (half of the show); it is still aired and has managed to keep up its impressive ratings.

Due to the success of Vídeo Show, Angelica's popularity heightened again, leading to her being in a lot of advertising campaigns and appearing on magazine covers. She also presented the first two seasons of Fame, Brazilian version of Operación Triunfo (Operation Triumph).

Since her well-received return to TV, presenting Vídeo Show, Rede Globo began planning projects for her, but her own show finally started in April 2006. "Estrelas" is a show where Angélica interviews stars and shows their intimacy (house, hobbies, etc.). The show is #1 in its time-slot in the states which show the program and airs every Saturday before TV Xuxa.

=== Acting career ===
Angélica had her first acting role on the successful mini-series, "The Guarani" at Rede Manchete. During the late 1980s and early 1990s, she had roles in several Os Trapalhões movies .

In 1996 she starred in the kids drama show Caça Talentos, which aired daily after "Angel Mix". While the show was a big hit for three years when the show was declinated it was replaced by Bambuluá, where she played a super-hero, which flopped.

She returned to acting in 1998; she had a starring role in Simão, o Fantasma Trapalhão, with Renato Aragão, only the best receivied by the public.

At the end of 1998, at the peak of her popularity, she starred in a special and highly promoted live special popular sitcom Sai de Baixo and in 2001 she had a recurring role on soap opera Um Anjo Caiu do Céu, where she played an angel: Angelina.

In 2004, Angélica was again one of the biggest TV presenters in Brazil thanks to "Vídeo Game" and Globo decided to release another movie with her in the leading role, but the teen-oriented movie, Um Show de Verão (which she starred in with Luciano Huck) didn't achieve expected success, in part due to it being rated PG-14.

In 2010, Angélica and Luciano Huck were one of the casts of a drama miniseries, As Cariocas However, the last episode featuring them proved to be the most watched episode in Brazil.

Since 2001, until 2011, she made "Video Game". The "Video Game" was stopped, with ten years.

Since 2006, she presented Estrelas, a TV program of interviewing celebrities, until 2018.

== Personal life ==
Angélica was born in Santo André, the daughter of Francisco and Angelina Ksyvickis. She has one sister, businesswoman (artistic producer) Marcia Marbá. She is of Ukrainian, Lithuanian, Italian, Portuguese, Polish, Austrian, Russian, Croatian and Romanian descent. According to research done her ancestors emigrated from Naples to Juiz de Fora. She also has Native Brazilian ancestry.

In May 2015 Angélica, her husband, her two nannies and her three children survived a plane crash in the Pantanal region of Mato Grosso do Sul. They were only lightly injured.

== Discography ==
Album title	Album details	Peak chart positions	Sales	Certifications
Album title	Album details	ABPD	Sales	Certifications
Angélica	Released: 1988; Label: Columbia Records; Format: LP, K7	1	2,500,000	Diamond (PMB)
Angélica	Released: 1989; Label: Columbia Records; Format: CD, LP, K7	1	1,000,000	Diamond (PMB)
Angélica	Released: 1990; Label: Columbia Records; Format: CD, LP, K7	1	1,000,000	Diamond (PMB)
Angélica	Released: 1991; Label: Columbia Records; Format: CD, LP, K7, download digital	1	700,000	2× Platinum (PMB)
Angélica	Released: 1992; Label: Columbia Records; Format: CD, LP, K7, download digital	1	1,000,000	Diamond (PMB)
Meu Jeito de Ser	Released: 1993; Label: Columbia Records; Format: CD, LP, K7, download digital	1	300,000	Platinum (PMB)
Angélica	Released: 1994; Label: Columbia Records; Format: CD, LP, K7, download digital	1	500,000	2× Platinum (PMB)
Angélica	Released: 1995; Label: Columbia Records; Format: CD, LP, K7, download digital	6	270,000	Platinum (PMB)
Angélica	Released: 1996; Label: Columbia Records; Format: CD, K7, download digital	1	1,000,000	Diamond (PMB)
Angélica	Released: 1997; Label: Columbia Records; Format: CD, K7, download digital	1	1,500,000	Diamond (PMB)
Angélica	Released: 1998; Label: Columbia Records; Format: CD, download digital	1	300,000	Platinum (PMB)
Angel Hits & Amigos	Released: 1999; Label: Sony; Format: CD, download digital	7	100,000	
Angélica	Released: 2001; Label: Universal Music Group; Format: CD, download digital	1	100,000	Gold (PMB)

== Filmography ==
Year	Title	Role	Note
1979	Buzina do Chacrinha	Participant	Segment: "A Criança Mais Bonita do Brasil"
1982	Avenida Paulista	Anamaria Scorza (young)	Episode: "10 de maio"
1987	Nave da Fantasia	Host	
1987–93	Clube da Criança	Host	
1988–93	Milk Shake	Host	
1990	Um Sonho de Menina	Herself	New Year's Eve special
1991	O Guarani	Cecília	
1993–96	Casa da Angélica	Host	
1995–96	Passa ou Repassa	Host	
1995–96	TV Animal	Host	
1996	Sai de Baixo	Herself	Episode: "Chez Cassandra"
1996–98	Caça Talentos	Fada Bela	
1996–2000	Angel Mix	Host	
1997	Alice no País da Música	Alice	New Year's Eve special
1998	Leitura nas Férias	Host	Vacation special
1998	Asas Pra Que Te Quero	Angel	New Year's Eve special
1999–2000	Flora Encantada	Flora	
2000	Férias Animadas	Host	Vacation special
2000	Angélica na Estrada	Angélica	Vacation special
2000	TV Ano 50	Host	Episode: "Auditório & Musicais"
2000–01	Bambuluá	Angélica	
2001	Um Anjo Caiu do Céu	Angelina Querubim	
2001–11	Video Game	Host	
2002	Sítio do Picapau Amarelo	Cuca (disguised as Angélica)	Episode: "A Pedra Mágica de Tupã"
2002–05	Fama	Host	
2003–08	Vídeo Show Retrô	Host	New Year's Eve specials
2004	Celebridade	Herself	Episode: "5 de abril"
2006–18	Estrelas	Host	
2009	Casseta & Planeta, Urgente!	Various characters	Episode: "14 de abril"
2010	As Cariocas	Maria Teresa	Episode: "A Traída da Barra"
2011	Fina Estampa	Herself	Episode: "28 de setembro"
2014	Geração Brasil	Herself	Episode: "14 de julho"
2017	Tá no Ar: a TV na TV	Herself	Episode: "24 de janeiro"
2017	Vídeo Game	Host	
2019	Detetives do Prédio Azul	Rexy Rowlands	Episode: "Rexy, a Ex"
2019	A Dona do Pedaço	Herself	Episode: "8–29 de outubro"
2019	Vai Que Cola	Herself	Episode: "Mix de Angel"
2020	Simples Assim	Host	

=== Films ===
Year	Title	Role
1988	Os Heróis Trapalhões - Uma Aventura na Selva	Angélica
1989	Os Trapalhões na Terra dos Monstros	Angélica
1990	Uma Escola Atrapalhada	Tami Azeredo de Castro
1998	Simão, o Fantasma Trapalhão	Herself (Simão disguised)
1999	Zoando na TV	Angel
2001	Xuxa and the Elves	Fada Melissa
2004	A Summer Show	Andréa
2009	Xuxa in the Mystery of Feiurinha	Rapunzel
2020	De Perto, Ela Não é Normal	Rebeca

=== Dubbing ===
Year	Title	Role
1989	Master Eder and his Pumuckl	Fleur
1992	The Wizard of Oz	Angélica
1994	Cartoon All-Stars to the Rescue	Corey
1998	The Swan Princess: Escape from Castle Mountain	Odette
