= David Brazil (promoter) =

Brazilian promoter of events and actor

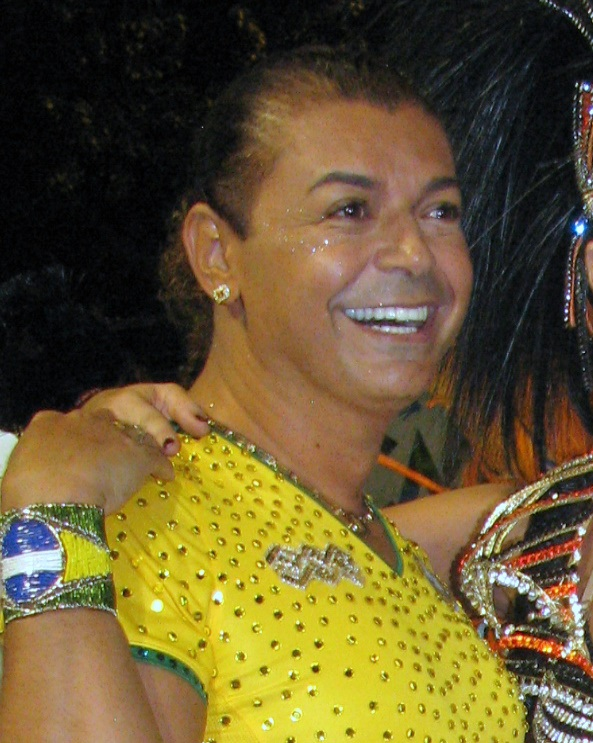
- Born: July 25, 1969 (age 56); Recife, Brazil
- Known for: Television, Radio (Brazil)

David Brazil (born July 25, 1969) is a Brazilian promoter of events and actor.

== Early life ==
He frequently participates in programs of SBT and RedeTV!, especially those related to LGBT topics. He is also famous for having publicly announcing his homosexuality. He also has a stutter, and some viewers have doubted whether his stuttering is real.

== Career ==
He often appears in magazines about fashion and gossip, participated in tables as a reporter for the Domingo Legal and various programs of the RedeTV!, works in promotion of events, as well as programs to work sporadically in the auditorium of invitation to be presenters and communicator of FM Day. He's also promoter the school of samba Rio Grande.
