= Super Xuxa contra Baixo Astral =

1988 film directed by Anna Penido, David Sonnenschein

Super Xuxa Contra Baixo Astral
- Directed by: Anna Penido
- Screenplay by: Anna Penido
- Story by: Anna Penido; David Sonnenschein
- Produced by: Diler Trindade
- Starring: Xuxa Meneghel; Guilherme Karan; Jonas Torres
- Cinematography: Nonato Estrela
- Edited by: Vera Freire; Carlos Cox
- Music by: Michael Sullivan; Paulo Massadas; Anna Penido
- Production companies: Dreamvision; Movies Rio; Diller & Associados
- Distributed by: Alvorada Filmes; Grupo Severiano Ribeiro; Wermar
- Release date: June 30, 1988
- Running time: 86 minutes
- Country: Brazil
- Language: Portuguese

Super Xuxa Contra Baixo Astral (known in the United States as Super Xuxa vs. Bad Vibes) is a 1988 Brazilian fantasy film directed by Anna Penido and David Sonnenschein starring Xuxa Meneghel.

Produced in 1988 by Dreamvision, with co-production by Movies Rio and Diller & Associados and Rio Filme, it marked the first time producer Diler Trindade and Xuxa worked together, which later led to eleven more films between 1989 and 2006, including Lua de Cristal, which broke Brazilian box office records in 1990. The film was released theatrically by Alvorada Filmes, Grupo Severiano Ribeiro, and Wermar in a then-record 93 cinemas (the widest release for a Brazilian film at the time), on June 30, 1988.

== Plot ==
Xuxa (Xuxa), a TV show host, gives an interview to the TV Fim television program inviting children all over Brazil to join her in a quest for peace and happiness, by painting colorful murals over graffiti walls. However, an evil force called Baixo Astral (Guilherme Karan), who lives underground in the sewers, is not happy with her campaign, and, with the help of his henchmen Titica and Morcegão, kidnap Xuxa's dog, Xuxo. To get Xuxo back, Xuxa will have to undergo a series of challenges, such as passing a giant wall made up of illusions, crossing a desert and swimming across the sea. Aiding her are a gypsy caterpillar, Xixa, and a wise tortoise, as well as a rebel teenager, Rafa. Together, they'll slide down to Baixo Astral's realm, and rescue Xuxo from his evil intentions.

== Cast ==
- Xuxa Meneghel .... Super Xuxa
- Nair Amorim .... Xuxo
- Guilherme Karan .... Baixo Astral
- Jonas Torres .... Rafa
- Paolo Paceli .... Titica
- Roberto Guimarães .... Morcegão
- Henriqueta Brieba .... Vovó Cascadura
- Luiz Carlos Tourinho .... Pássaro da Árvore da Consciência

== Production ==
The film was directed by Anna Penido and David Sonnenschein. Sonneschein worked as co-director, but was later unbilled based on a false legal challenge of not being unionized as a non-Brazilian citizen (he had already become a legal resident and joined the union). The movie is accused of being based on Jim Henson's Labyrinth, released two years before. The film was the last credited work of Lael Rodrigues, who would die of acute pancreatitis the following year.

Penido also wrote the script, with the help of fellow TV-writer Antonio Calmon. According to the DVD making-of featurette on the 2001 DVD release, Penido had just finished film school in California when she arrived in Rio, and saw Xuxa on television. She was impressed by the positive messages from her kids show, and wrote a screenplay that reflected the same environmental and positive attitudes Xuxa display on TV, and which Penido herself firmly believed in. Xuxa, who at the time had already signed a contract to star in another film, was so happy with Penido's scrip that she broke this contract and decided to work on Super Xuxa instead, marking her feature film debut in a leading role.

Shooting began in January 1988, and wrapped 40 days later, in Rio de Janeiro. The film's opening sequences, with Xuxa and the kids painting a mural on the street, were shot on a Rio de Janeiro street in the middle of a 100-degree summer. According to newspaper Folha de São Paulo, shooting had to be stopped numerous times due to Xuxa, then one of the leading celebrities in Brazilian television and music, attracting hundreds of fans. The final scene, with the kids dancing in front of the painted mural was shot in Rio's Bothanical Garden. All other scenes were shot on 8 studios built specially for the film in Rio's Ponto Filmes.

Puppetry work was done by Cem Modos (also known as Criadores e Criaturas), a Brazilian puppeteering group who especialized in TV ads, family entertainment, special effects and stage content - they would later create the puppets for TV Colosso: The Hot Dog Channel, the television show which substituted Xuxa's own Xou da Xuxa when it was canceled in 1993. The group was always open fans of Jim Henson's creations, which might've played a role on the film's striking similarities with Labyrinth.

Super Xuxa was the first film who used the then recently approved Sarney Law, which allowed private companies to buy quotas in film productions, in exchange for publicity within the film itself. According to Penido, because these deals were being made while shooting was already happening, many changes in the script had to be made to accommodate these new merchandising opportunities - most notably, the character design for the dog Xuxo had to be redone after a licesing deal was signed with a toy company to manufacture a plush doll based on Xuxa's own dog in real life. Because of these deals, the film was already paid for once the first ticket was sold, and producers managed to strike deals with exhibitors to cut down ticket prices in half, which helped the film's box office intake at a time where Brazilian economy was at a downturn. Sarney Law was eventually overturned in 1991, which ignited a period of 4 years where Brazilian film production was halted.

== Reception ==
=== Response ===
The film opened on July 30, 1988, during the winter break, to huge anticipation and amid a then unprecedent marketing campaign, which included TV and newspaper ads and indoor theme parks installed in malls in markets like Rio de Janeiro and São Paulo. In its first week of release, Super Xuxa sold over 100,000 tickets, placing #2 at the box office. The film eventually sold over 2,8 million tickets over the course of its first three months of release, and re-released in theaters twice: during the holiday break of 1988, and again during Children's Day holiday of 1990, as part of a triple-bill with Xuxa's 1989's A Princesa Xuxa e os Trapalhões and 1990's Lua de Cristal. It placed third among the biggest ticket sellers in Brazil for the year of 1988, behind Rambo III and Os Heróis Trapalhões.

=== Critical reception ===
Super Xuxa was critically panned among Brazilian film journalists in its initial release. Newspaper Folha de São Paulo criticized its excessive merchandising, while Jornal do Brasil cited some of the character design as "grotesque". Xuxa, herself, was quoted as saying she was dissatisfied with the birds in the film, saying "they could look better".

Retrospective reviews have re-analyzed the film as a kitsch, nostalgia piece. The Spinning Image says, "while simplistic (this is a kids' movie, after all), the core message that only education can enable young people to overthrow oppression and achieve true freedom is both potent and heartening. That it is delivered in the form of a pop song performed by a sexily gyrating supermodel is simply a bonus.". The film has since achieved cult classic status.

=== International release ===
After Lua de Cristal (Crystal Moon), a 1990 fantasy drama starring Xuxa, achieved huge success both in Brazil (it was the most watched Brazilian film of the 1990s) and other Latin American countries, the movie was released in Argentina as Super Xuxa Vs. Bajo Astral, with some success. It became available in the U.S. for the first time in non-authorized bootleg copies, under the title Super Xuxa Vs. Satan..

=== 2026 re-release ===
In 2025, Dreamvision announced a 4K remaster of the film, with a tentative 2026 release. The process was halted after the first reel of the original negative surces was found to be missing from the National Archives.. Later that year, two original exhibition copies from the movie's 1988 release were found with collectors, and the process started in August, finishing later in December that year..

In January 2026, Dreamvision officially announced the March release of the new 4k scan of the movie. The movie was re-released in streaming services in March 6th, with a brief limited theatrical re-release following, and a cable TV debut in March 27th.

== Soundtrack ==
Super Xuxa contra Baixo Astral

Soundtrack album by Various artists
- Released: 1989
- Recorded: 1987–88
- Genre: Pop
- Label: Som Livre
- Producers: Michael Sullivan; Paulo Massadas

The soundtrack consists of songs performed by Xuxa Meneghel and other artists.

=== Track listing ===
1. Arco-Íris
2. Flexionar
3. Ei Machão
4. Túnel do Terror
5. Sonho (Sandra de Sá)
6. Voar Voar (Trem da Alegria)
7. Alto Astral
8. Burocracia
9. Eu Quero Saber
10. Somos Um Só
11. Voar Voar (instrumental)

=== Certifications ===
Region	Certification	Sales/shipments
Brazil (ABPD)	Gold	100,000*
*sales only based on certification

== DVD ==
In 2001 the film was released in DVD by Som Livre. The extras include a making-of featurette, special karaoke soundtrack for the songs and subtitles in English and Spanish. But the DVD was criticised for having bad sound and video quality, and for the poor translation of the English subtitles. A second DVD release came in 2017, in a box-set with Lua de Cristal, by Bretz Filmes. It became officially available in streaming platform Globoplay in 2023.

== Awards ==
Fantasporto (1989)

- International Fantasy Film Award (Best Film, nomination)

== See also ==
- List of Brazilian films of the 1980s
