= Adriana Bombom =

Brazilian dancer, model, television host, and actress

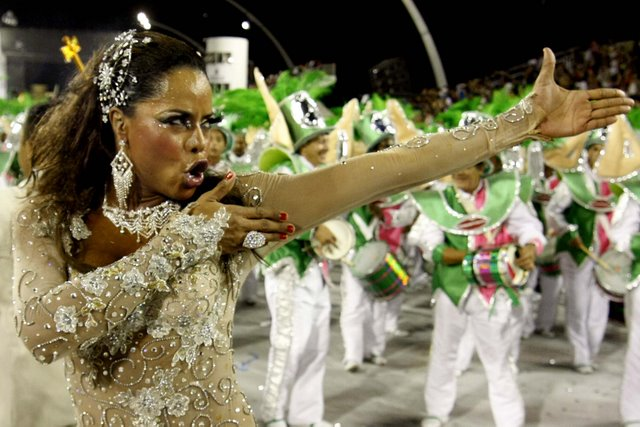
- Bombom performing at the 2010 Carnaval at São Paulo.
- Born: Adriana Soares; 1974 (age 51–52)
- Occupation: Dancer
- Spouse: Dudu Nobre (div. 2009)
- Children: 2

Adriana Bombom (born 1974), stage name of Adriana Soares, is a Brazilian dancer, model, television host, and actress.

== Biography ==
In her early days, Adriana Bombom lived in an orphanage and worked as a nanny and as a saleslady. In 1996, she was invited to work for the TV show Xuxa Park where she participated in the sketch comedy "Academia de ginástica da Xuxa". She then worked as a dancer in the show Planeta Xuxa, where, according to at least one author, she played "a secondary, but very visible role" so Xuxa could avoid the accusations that her show did not hire black artists. While working there, she released a single with two songs that she used to sing during the intervals of the show. The songs were "Dança da Bombom" ("Bombom's Dance") and "Bom Apetite" ("Enjoy Your Meal").

She participated in the TV shows A Turma do Didi, Zorra Total, and Sob Nova Direção, all of them aired by the television network Rede Globo. In Rede Bandeirantes, Adriana Bombom made reports for TV shows such as Leonor Corrêa and Leão Lobo. In 2006 she began to host the variety show Bom Demais, aired by Rede Record of Rio de Janeiro. She also played a role in four feature films, among them Xuxa Requebra, in 1999, and Xuxa Popstar, in 2000; and was the protagonist of two short subjects, among them A incrível história da mulher que mudou de cor, in 2004.

In September 2004, she appeared on the cover of the Brazilian adult magazine Sexy, being one of the few black women to do so.

In 2009, Adriana participated in the second edition of the reality show of Rede Record, A Fazenda 2, but was eliminated in the third week.

She married the sambista Dudu Nobre for nine years and had two daughters with him, Olívia and Thalita. In 2009, Bombom and Dudu Nobre were divorced.
