= Eike Duarte =

Brazilian actor (born 1997)

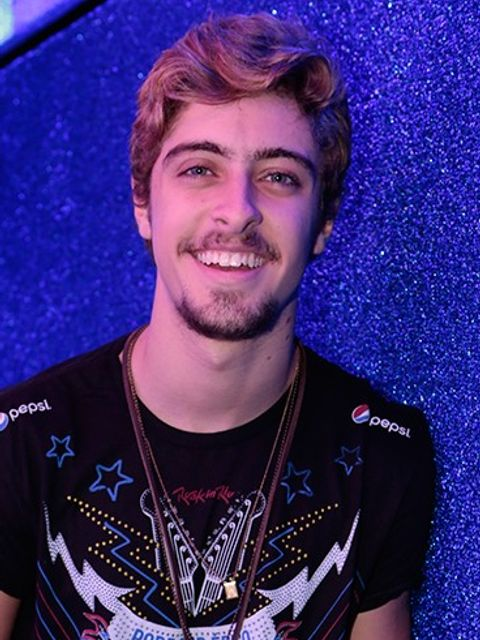
- Duarte in 2016
- Born: Eike Duarte Oliveira; February 17, 1997 (age 29); Rio de Janeiro, Brazil
- Occupation: Actor
- Years active: 2004–present

Eike Duarte Oliveira (born February 17, 1997), better known as Eike Duarte, is a Brazilian actor who became known for his participation as a child in the programs of presenter Xuxa Meneghel and comedian Renato Aragão. In 2017, the actor played his first villain, the character Marcelo Mahla, in the series Juacas, on Disney Channel.

Duarte debuted in 2004 on the program Xuxa no Mundo da Imaginação and until 2016 participated in the fixed cast of Rede Globo and joined the cast of soap operas such as Em Família in 2014 and Sol Nascente in 2016.

In his personal life, Eike dated fellow actress Giulia Costa from 2012 to 2015 and since then he has not taken on another serious relationship.

== Filmography ==
=== Television ===
Year	Title	Role	Ref.
2002	Xuxa no Mundo da Imaginação	Various	
2006	Xuxa Especial de Natal - Natal Todo Dia	Erik	
2007	O Segredo da Princesa Lili	Galante	
2008	Negócio da China	Théo Noronha Alonso	
2009–2011	Acampamento de Férias	Greg	
2009	Chico e Amigos	Pedrinho	
2012	Acampamento de Férias	Bill	
2013	Flor do Caribe	Cassiano (Young)	
2014	Em Família	Laerte (1st phase)	
2015	Amor Veríssimo	Venancinho	
2016	Sol Nascente	Ralf Tatoo (Young)	
2017	Juacas	Marcelo Mahla	
2018	Se Eu Fechar os Olhos Agora	Antônio Dias	
2018–2019	Malhação: Vidas Brasileiras	Álvaro Borges	
2024	Reis	Ziza, Príncipe de Judá	
2025	Power Couple Brasil	Participant	
2025	Uma Garota Comum	TBA	

=== TV presenter/reporter ===
Year	Title	Role
2006–2007	TV Xuxa	Himself
2006	Xuxa 20 anos	Himself

=== Film ===
Year	Title	Role	Notes
2006	O Cavaleiro Didi e a Princesa Lili	Galante (child)	
2006	O Cavaleiro Didi e a Princesa Lili	Nephew of Galante	
2006	Xuxa Gêmeas	Byte	
2020	Airplane Mode	Gil	Netflix film
2023	Eu Tenho uma Voz	Tio	Short film

=== Video/DVD ===
Year	Title	Role
2004	Xuxa só para Baixinhos 5 – Circo	Himself
2005	Xuxa solamente para bajitos	Himself
2005	Xuxa só para Baixinhos 6 – Festa	Himself
2007	Xuxa só para Baixinhos 7	Himself
2008	Xuxa só para Baixinhos 8	Himself
