= Xuxa só para Baixinhos 8 – Escola =

Xuxa só para Baixinhos Vol. 8 - Escola

Studio album by Xuxa
- Released: September 13, 2008
- Recorded: 2008
- Genre: Children's music
- Length: 63:03
- Label: Som Livre
- Producers: Mônica Muniz; Luiz Claudio Moreira

Xuxa chronology
Xuxa Festa – Ao Vivo (2008)	Xuxa só para Baixinhos Vol. 8 - Escola (2008)	Só para Baixinhos Vol. 9 (2009)

Singles from Xuxa só Para Baixinhos 8
- 1. "XSPB No Ar" Released: 2008; 2. "Tumbalacatumba" Released: 2008; 3. "Olha a Música" Released: 2008

Xuxa só para Baixinhos 8 – Escola (also known as XSPB 8) (transl. Only for Children Eight – School) is the thirty-first studio album by Brazilian recording artist Xuxa, released on September 13, 2008, by Som Livre. It is the eighth album in the collection Só Para Baixinhos.

== Release and reception ==
Xuxa só para Baixinhos 8 - Escola was released on September 13, 2008. The album sold more than 371,000 copies, ranking 7th on the list of best-selling DVDs in Brazil in 2008. The singles were "XSPB no ar", "Tumbalacatumba" and "Olha a Música". This was the last album of the collection "Só Para Baixinhos" released by the record company Som Livre, before Xuxa signed contract with the record company Sony Music. At the end of 2014, XSPBs 6, 7 and 8 were released on Blu-ray by Som Livre.

== Track listing ==
Xuxa só para Baixinhos 8 – CD edition
No.	Title	Writer(s)	Length
1.	"XSPB No Ar"	Vanessa Alves, Leonardo Sperling	1:45
2.	"Olha a Música"	Vanessa Alves, Rafael Sperling	2:29
3.	"Hora do Recreio"	Vanessa Alves, Leonardo Sperling	2:06
4.	"Tumbalacatumba"	Vanessa Guzzo, Arjona	2:57
5.	"O Mundo do Contrário"	Vanessa Alves, Ary Sperling, Rogério Meanda	2:30
6.	"Pot-Pourri: Boneca de Lata / Dez Indiozinhos / Entrei na Roda"	D. P. - Arranjo e Adaptação: Vanessa Alves; Xuxa Meneghel	3:05
7.	"Aquecendo Com a Bila Bilú"	Vanessa Alves, Ary Sperling, Rogério Meanda	1:44
8.	"Professor de Música" (com Gabriel, o Pensador e Tiago Mocotó)	Gabriel o Pensador, Tiago Mocotó	3:23
9.	"ABC do Txutxucão"	Vanessa Alves, Ary Sperling, Rogério Meanda	2:44
10.	"Tabuada do Nove"	Vanessa Alves, Rafael Sperling	1:46
11.	"Brincando de Soletrar"	Vanessa Alves, Leonardo Sperling	1:48
12.	"Palavrinhas Mágicas"	Vanessa Alves, Rafael Sperling	1:58
13.	"Doze Meses"	Vanessa Alves, Leonardo Sperling	1:47
14.	"Um Bom Livro"	Vanessa Alves, Rafael Sperling	1:42
15.	"Escove os Dentes" (Brush Your Teeth)	Raffi, Louise Dean Cullen; Version: Vanessa Alves, Xuxa Meneghel	1:14
16.	"Contar Carneirinhos"	Vanessa Alves, Ary Sperling	2:44
Total length:			35:59

Xuxa só para Baixinhos 8 – DVD Edition
No.	Title	Writer(s)	Length
1.	"Introdução"		0:44
2.	"XSPB No Ar"	Vanessa Alves, Leonardo Sperling	1:13
3.	"Passagem (Music with Vowels)"		0:45
4.	"Escove os Dentes" (Brush Your Teeth)	Raffi, Louise Dean Cullen; Version: Vanessa Alves, Xuxa Meneghel	1:14
5.	"Passagem (Music with Vowels)"		0:45
6.	"Brincando de Soletrar"	Vanessa Alves, Leonardo Sperling	1:48
7.	"Passagem (Tricks of Multiplying by 9)"		1:18
8.	"Tabuada do Nove"	Vanessa Alves, Rafael Sperling	1:46
9.	"Passagem (Vowels)"		0:52
10.	"Palavrinhas Mágicas"	Vanessa Alves, Rafael Sperling	1:58
11.	"Passagem (Numbers, from 1 to 8)"		1:00
12.	"Doze Meses"	Vanessa Alves, Leonardo Sperling	1:47
13.	"Passagem (Music)"		0:50
14.	"Olha a Música"	Vanessa Alves, Rafael Sperling	2:29
15.	"Passagem (Alphabet)"		0:42
16.	"ABC do Txutxucão"	Vanessa Alves, Ary Sperling, Rogério Meanda	2:44
17.	"Passagem (Children's songs)"		1:14
18.	"Hora do Recreio"	Vanessa Alves, Leonardo Sperling	2:06
19.	"Passagem (Numbers, from 1 to 8)"		0:52
20.	"Aquecendo Com a Bila Bilú"	Vanessa Alves, Ary Sperling, Rogério Meanda	1:44
21.	"Passagem (Letter "M" comes before "P" and "B")"		1:16
22.	"O Mundo do Contrário"	Vanessa Alves, Ary Sperling, Rogério Meanda	2:30
23.	"Passagem (Kids songs)"		1:00
24.	"Professor de Música" (com Gabriel, o Pensador e Tiago Mocotó)	Gabriel o Pensador, Tiago Mocotó	3:23
25.	"Pot-Pourri: Boneca de Lata / Dez Indiozinhos / Entrei na Roda"	D. P. - Arranjo e Adaptação: Vanessa Alves; Xuxa Meneghel	3:05
26.	"Passagem (Numbers, from 1 to 8)"		0:45
27.	"Tumbalacatumba"	Vanessa Guzzo, Arjona	2:57
28.	"Passagem (Books)"		0:46
29.	"Passagem (Vowels)"		1:28
30.	"Contar Carneirinhos"	Vanessa Alves, Ary Sperling	2:44
31.	"Créditos" (Hora do Recreio / ABC do Txutxucão / Professor de Música / Nove Meses (Instrumental))		11:01
Total length:			63:03

== Personnel ==
- Art Direction: Xuxa Meneghel
- Direction: Paulo de Barros
- Production: Luiz Cláudio Moreira e Mônica Muniz
- Production Director: Junior Porto
- Musical production: Ary Sperling
- CD Mastering: Evren Göknar
- Cover and Ente: Felipe Gois
- Cinematography: André Horta
- Set design: Lueli Antunes

== Certifications ==
Region	Certification	Certified units/sales
Brazil DVD	—	370,000
