= Xuxa só para Baixinhos 9 – Natal Mágico =

Xuxa só para Baixinhos Vol. 9 – Natal Mágico

Studio album by Xuxa
- Released: October 5, 2009
- Recorded: 2008–09
- Genres: Christmas; children's
- Length: 75:15
- Label: Sony Music
- Producer: Paulo de Barros

Xuxa chronology
Só para Baixinhos 8 (2008)	Xuxa só para Baixinhos Vol. 9 – Natal Mágico (2009)	Só para Baixinhos Vol. 10 (2010)

Singles from Xuxa só Para Baixinhos 9
- 1. "Você Acredita em Mágica?" Released: 2009; 2. "Vem Chegando o Natal" Released: 2009; 3. "Papai Noel Existe" Released: 2009

Xuxa só Para Baixinhos 9 or Natal Mágico (also known as XSPB 9) (transl. Only for Children Nine – Magic Christmas) is the thirty-second studio album by Brazilian recording artist Xuxa, released on October 5, 2009, by Sony Music as the ninth album in the collection Só Para Baixinhos.

== Release and reception ==
Xuxa só Para Baixinhos 9 was released on October 5, 2009, the DVD sold more than 25,000 copies, receiving gold certification. XSPB 9 sold more than 50,000 copies and was one of the best selling albums in Brazil. The singles were "Papai Noel Existe", "Vem Chagando o Natal" and "Você Acredita em Mágica?". It was released in the formats DVD, CD, DVD + CD and DVD + CD + Projector Pen (the pack with the DVD and the CD and a pen that designs images of the Class of the Xuxinha).

The first format of the album to be released was the CD, which was released in Digipack format (i.e. a deluxe edition), and the only Xuxa CD that had been released in this format is the compilation Xuxa 20 Anos. The CD released on the DVD and CD pack includes 3 bonus tracks. This was the first album in the collection Só Para Baixinhos released by Sony Music, after Xuxa did not renew his contract with the record company Som Livre, in which he had released the first eight volumes of the series. At the end of 2010, the album was released on Blu-ray by Sony. The song "Você Acredita em Mágica" was part of the soundtrack of the film Xuxa em O Mistério de Feiurinha (2009).

== Tour ==
Natal Mágico Tour is the fifteenth tour presenter and singer Xuxa Meneghel, the tour is based the album Xuxa só Para Baixinhos 9. The shows were held in Maracanãzinho, Rio de Janeiro and São Paulo. Unlike other tours, there is no sale of show tickets. They are carried out for children and adolescents from underprivileged communities in Rio de Janeiro and for children from the Xuxa Meneghel Foundation.

Through a promotion through Xuxa.com website (official website of Xuxa) fans can win tickets to the show. In 2010, the show held at Maracanãzinho was shown as a special Christmas of Xuxa on the night of December 24 and was later released on DVD in 2012, and the fourth tour Xuxa to have a record released. In 2014, several parts of the show held in São Paulo, including an exclusive interview granted Xuxa, were displayed as a Christmas special on Canal Viva. In every show, singers make appearances during the show, as Restart and Ivete Sangalo.

== Track listing ==
Xuxa só para Baixinhos 9 – CD edition
No.	Title	Writer(s)	Length
1.	"Vem Chegando o Natal" (Santa Claus is Coming to Town)	J. S. Coots and Haven Gillespie (translated by Aline Barros)	2:29
2.	"Natal de Paz"	Vanessa Alves, Leonardo Barros and Cátia Pereira	3:21
3.	"Papai Noel Existe" (My Only Wish (This Year))	Brian Kierulf and Josh Schwartz (translated by Vanessa Alves)	4:14
4.	"O Menino Jesus Vai Nascer"	Vanessa Alves and Maurício Gaetani	3:39
5.	"Eu Adoro a Noite de Natal" (Christmas is Our Favorite Time of Year)	Joseph Phillips (translated by Vanessa Alves)	2:43
6.	"Pot-Pourri: Noite Feliz / Pinherinho de Natal / Bate o Sino" ("Silent Night (Stille Nacht)", "Deck The Halls" and "Jingle Bells")	Joseph Mohr and Franz Xaver Gruber, arranged by The Wiggles (M Cook, J Fatt, A Field and G Page) and translated by Vanessa Alves and Xuxa Meneghel / D. P., arranged by Bob Singleton and translated by Vanessa Alves and Márcio Lomiranda / D. P., arranged by The Wiggles (M Cook, J Fatt, A Field and G Page) and translated by Vanessa Alves and Xuxa Meneghel	4:13
7.	"Você Acredita em Mágica?" (Do You Believe in Magic?) (featuring Lulu Santos)	John B. Sebastian (translated by Vanessa Alves)	2:17
8.	"Natal Mágico" (I Guess It's Christmas Time) (featuring Zezé di Camargo & Luciano)	Shelly Peiken and Peter S. Bliss (translated by Vanessa Alves)	4:09
9.	"Natal do Brasil" (featuring Carlinhos Brown)	Vanessa Alves and Márcio Lomiranda	2:11
10.	"Um Feliz Natal" (Feliz Navidad) (featuring Zeca Pagodinho)	José Feliciano (translated by Ivan Lins)	3:13
11.	"Natal Todo Dia" (featuring Ivete Sangalo)	Maurício Gaetanis	3:51
12.	"Amém" (Amen)	Carlos Toro, Ralf Stelmman, Christian de Walden and Margareth Harris; Version: Zé Henrique and Ângela Mattos	3:53
13.	"Estrela Guia"	Michael Sullivan and Paulo Massadas	4:18
14.	"Parabéns Pra Jesus" (featuring Marcelo Rossi)	Michael Sullivan and Carlos Colla	4:48
15.	"Então é Natal" (Happy Xmas (War Is Over)) (featuring Lulu Santos, Zeca Pagodinho, Carlinhos Brown, Zezé di Camargo & Luciano, Marcelo Rossi and Ivete Sangalo)	John Lennon and Yoko Ono (translated by Cláudio Rabello)	3:43
Total length:			53:20

Xuxa só para Baixinhos 9 – DVD + CD Pack Version
No.	Title	Writer(s)	Length
1.	"Vem Chegando o Natal" (Santa Claus is Coming to Town)	J. S. Coots and Haven Gillespie (translated by Aline Barros)	2:29
2.	"Natal de Paz"	Vanessa Alves, Leonardo Barros and Cátia Pereira	3:21
3.	"Papai Noel Existe" (My Only Wish (This Year))	Brian Kierulf and Josh Schwartz (translated by Vanessa Alves)	4:14
4.	"O Menino Jesus Vai Nascer"	Vanessa Alves and Maurício Gaetani	3:39
5.	"Eu Adoro a Noite de Natal" (Christmas is Our Favorite Time of Year)	Joseph Phillips (translated by Vanessa Alves)	2:43
6.	"Pot-Pourri: Noite Feliz / Pinherinho de Natal / Bate o Sino" ("Silent Night (Stille Nacht)", "Deck The Halls" e "Jingle Bells")	Joseph Mohr and Franz Xaver Gruber, arranged by The Wiggles (M Cook, J Fatt, A Field and G Page) and translated by Vanessa Alves and Xuxa Meneghel / D. P., arranged by Bob Singleton and translated by Vanessa Alves and Márcio Lomiranda / D. P., arranged by The Wiggles (M Cook, J Fatt, A Field and G Page) and translated by Vanessa Alves and Xuxa Meneghel	4:13
7.	"Você Acredita em Mágica?" (Do You Believe in Magic?) (featuring Lulu Santos)	John B. Sebastian (translated by Vanessa Alves)	2:17
8.	"Natal Mágico" (I Guess It's Christmas Time) (featuring Zezé di Camargo & Luciano)	Shelly Peiken and Peter S. Bliss (translated by Vanessa Alves)	4:09
9.	"Natal do Brasil" (featuring Carlinhos Brown)	Vanessa Alves and Márcio Lomiranda	2:11
10.	"Um Feliz Natal" (Feliz Navidad) (featuring Zeca Pagodinho)	José Feliciano (translated by Ivan Lins)	3:13
11.	"Natal Todo Dia" (featuring Ivete Sangalo)	Maurício Gaetani	3:51
12.	"Amém" (Amen)	Carlos Toro, Ralf Stelmman, Christian de Walden and Margareth Harris; Version: Zé Henrique and Ângela Mattos	3:53
13.	"Estrela Guia"	Michael Sullivan and Paulo Massadas	4:18
14.	"Parabéns Pra Jesus" (featuring Marcelo Rossi)	Michael Sullivan and Carlos Colla	4:48
15.	"Então é Natal" (Happy Xmas (War Is Over)) (featuring Lulu Santos, Zeca Pagodinho, Carlinhos Brown, Zezé di Camargo & Luciano, Marcelo Rossi and Ivete Sangalo)	John Lennon and Yoko Ono (translated by Cláudio Rabello)	3:43
16.	"Você Acredita em Mágica?" (Do You Believe in Magic?)	John B. Sebastian (translated by Vanessa Alves)	2:17
17.	"Papai Noel Você já me Esqueceu?" (When Christmas Comes To Town) (sung by Thatiane Carvalho)	Glenn Ballard and Alan Silvestri (translated by Vanessa Alves)	4:38
18.	"Papai Noel Existe" (Vidal Festa Remix) (My Only Wish (This Year))	Brian Kierulf and Josh Schwartz (translated by Vanessa Alves)	4:07
Total length:			75:15

Xuxa só para Baixinhos 9 – DVD edition
No.	Title	Writer(s)	Length
1.	"Introdução"		0:47
2.	"Você Acredita em Mágica?" (Do You Believe in Magic?) (featuring Lulu Santos)	John B. Sebastian (translated by Vanessa Alves)	2:21
3.	"Passage (Babies)"		0:25
4.	"Eu Adoro a Noite de Natal" (Christmas is Our Favorite Time of Year)	Joseph Phillips (translated by Vanessa Alves)	2:47
5.	"Passage (Babies)"		0:16
6.	"Um Feliz Natal" (Feliz Navidad) (featuring Zeca Pagodinho)	José Feliciano (translated by Ivan Lins)	3:17
7.	"Passage (Babies)"		0:20
8.	"Vem Chegando o Natal" (Santa Claus is Coming to Town)	J. S. Coots and Haven Gillespie (translated by Aline Barros)	2:33
9.	"Passage (Babies)"		0:20
10.	"Natal do Brasil" (featuring Carlinhos Brown)	Vanessa Alves and Márcio Lomiranda	2:15
11.	"Passage (Babies)"		0:15
12.	"Papai Noel Existe" (My Only Wish (This Year))	Brian Kierulf and Josh Schwartz (translated by Vanessa Alves)	6:17
13.	"Passage (Babies)"		0:18
14.	"Natal Mágico" (I Guess It's Christmas Time) (featuring Zezé di Camargo & Luciano)	Shelly Peiken and Peter S. Bliss (translated by Vanessa Alves)	4:13
15.	"Passage (Babies)"		0:17
16.	"Natal de Paz"	Vanessa Alves, Leonardo Barros and Cátia Pereira	3:25
17.	"Passage (Babies)"		0:22
18.	"Parabéns Pra Jesus" (featuring Marcelo Rossi)	Michael Sullivan and Carlos Colla	4:51
19.	"Passage (Babies)"		0:21
20.	"Amém" (Amen)	Carlos Toro, Ralf Stelmman, Christian de Walden and Margareth Harris; Version: Zé Henrique and Ângela Mattos	3:57
21.	"Passage (Babies)"		0:17
22.	"Natal Todo Dia" (featuring Ivete Sangalo)	Maurício Gaetani	3:55
23.	"Passage (Babies)"		0:19
24.	"O Menino Jesus Vai Nascer"	Vanessa Alves and Maurício Gaetani	3:43
25.	"Passage (Babies)"		0:22
26.	"Pot-Pourri: Noite Feliz / Pinherinho de Natal / Bate o Sino" ("Silent Night (Stille Nacht)", "Deck The Halls" and "Jingle Bells")	Joseph Mohr and Franz Xaver Gruber, arranged by The Wiggles (M Cook, J Fatt, A Field and G Page) and translated by Vanessa Alves and Xuxa Meneghel / D. P., arranged by Bob Singleton and translated by Vanessa Alves and Márcio Lomiranda / D. P., arranged by The Wiggles (M Cook, J Fatt, A Field and G Page) and translated by Vanessa Alves and Xuxa Meneghel	4:17
27.	"Passage (Babies)"		0:16
28.	"Estrela Guia"	Michael Sullivan and Paulo Massadas	4:22
29.	"Passage (Christmas is...)"		0:19
30.	"Papai Noel Você já me Esqueceu?" (When Christmas Comes To Town) (sung by Thatiane Carvalho)	Glenn Ballard and Alan Silvestri (translated by Vanessa Alves)	4:43
31.	"Passage (Babies)"		0:20
32.	"Então é Natal" (Happy Xmas (War Is Over)) (featuring Lulu Santos, Zeca Pagodinho, Carlinhos Brown, Zezé di Camargo & Luciano, Marcelo Rossi and Ivete Sangalo)	John Lennon and Yoko Ono (translated by Cláudio Rabello)	3:59
33.	"Você Acredita em Mágica?" (Credits) (Do You Believe in Magic?)	John B. Sebastian (translated by Vanessa Alves)	2:19
34.	"Credits" (Natal do Brasil / Eu Adoro a Noite de Natal / Natal de Paz (instrumental))		7:00
Total length:			75:15

== Personnel ==
- General and Artistic Direction: Xuxa Meneghel
- Direction: Paulo de Barros
- Production: Luiz Cláudio Moreira e Mônica Muniz
- Production Director: Junior Porto
- Musical production: Ary Sperling
- Cinematography by: André Horta
- Graphic project: Felipe Gois

== Certifications ==
Region	Certification	Certified units/sales
Brazil (Pro-Música Brasil) DVD	Gold	25,000^{*}
^{*} Sales figures based on certification alone.
