= Xuxa, o Documentário =

2023 Brazilian documentary television series

- Genre: Documentary
- Directed by: Pedro Bial; Cássia Dian; Mônica Almeida
- Country of origin: Brazil
- Original language: Portuguese
- No. of seasons: 1
- No. of episodes: 5

Production
- Producer: Anelise Franco
- Production companies: Endemol Shine Brasil; Conversa.doc

Original release
- Network: Globoplay
- Release: 13 July – 10 August 2023

Xuxa, o Documentário (English title: Xuxa, A Life on TV) is a Brazilian documentary television series consisting of five episodes about the life and career trajectory of Brazilian television host and singer Xuxa Meneghel. Co-produced by Conversa.doc and Endemol Shine Brasil, the series is directed by Pedro Bial and written by Camila Appel. It was released on July 13, 2023, by the Globoplay streaming platform.

== Production ==
On 26 January 2021, Xuxa spoke about her new projects on the television program Encontro com Fátima Bernardes and announced that Globoplay would produce a documentary about her, but did not give details of the script. "I have a project to make a documentary that will be released by Globoplay together with Endemol. This documentary had to have Globoplay's hand, because I worked here 29 years," she said.

In February 2021, it was reported in the press that Xuxa wanted Pedro Bial to direct the documentary. The approach of the two would have occurred in the previous year, when Xuxa participated in the talk show Conversa com Bial. In March 2023, during the recordings, Xuxa meets her former manager, Marlene Mattos, with whom she has not spoken since 2002.

During her participation in the TV program Saia Justa, on the GNT channel, Xuxa said she revived "something that I didn't even know existed. They did a huge research, I didn't even know that I had lived through all of that. I relived all of that, you know? Because they didn't just touch the trunk, they touched little boxes that were closed for a long time", he said.

== Cast ==
- Xuxa ... Herself
- Angélica ... Herself
- Andrea Veiga ... Herself
- Aretuza Garibaldi ... Herself
- Boni ... Himself
- Junno Andrade ... Himself
- Letícia Spiller ... Herself
- Luiza Brunet .. Herself
- Luciano Szafir ... Himself
- Marlene Mattos ... Herself
- Michael Sullivan ... Himself
- Marcelo Ribeiro ... Himself
- Marcelo Ribeiro ... Himself
- Michelly X ... Herself
- Paulo Massadas ... Himself
- Renato Aragão ... Himself
- Reinaldo Waisman ... Himself
- Sasha Meneghel ... Herself
- Sergio Mallandro ... Himself
- Tatiana Maranhão ... Herself

== Episodes ==
| Series | Episodes | Originally released |
|---|---|---|
| 1 | 5 | 13 July 2023 |

=== Series 1 ===
| No. | Title | Directed by | Written by | Original release date |
|---|---|---|---|---|
| 1 | "Supernova" | Cassia Dian & Monica Almeida | Camila Appel | 13 July 2023 |
Xuxa started her career as a teen magazine model. She began her television career with the Clube da Criança on Rede Manchete in the early 1980s. She became a national sensation when she joined TV Globo.
| 2 | "The world at your feet" | Cassia Dian & Monica Almeida | Camila Appel | 20 July 2023 |
Xuxa meets former child actor Marcelo Ribeiro, together they talk about the film Love Strange Love. Xuxa's success in cinema and music makes her gain projection throughout Latin America, Europe and the United States.
| 3 | "Love, Death. Life, Fire" | Cassia Dian & Monica Almeida | Camila Appel | 27 July 2023 |
Xuxa starts dating the Formula 1 champion, Ayrton Senna. After the tragic death of the pilot, she meets model and actor Luciano Szafir, where she fulfills her wish of becoming a mother. She recalls the birth of Sasha Meneghel and the fire at Xuxa Park.
| 4 | "Meetings and farewells" | Cassia Dian & Monica Almeida | Camila Appel | 3 August 2023 |
Xuxa is reunited with her former manager Marlene Mattos, the two broke off their friendship and work partnership and had not spoken for 19 years. In addition, Xuxa talks about the loss of her mother Alda, and recalls the life she had with her family.
| 5 | "A shocking old woman" | Cassia Dian & Monica Almeida | Camila Appel | 10 August 2023 |
Xuxa talks about the abuse she suffered as a child. A star who declared herself from an early age and always knew what she wanted. At the age of 24, she already said that she would become a shocking old woman.

== Release ==
On 28 October 2022, the first teaser for the series was released. In June 2023, Globoplay announced that the documentary will be released on 13 July 2023. The official trailer was released on 8 July 2023.
