= Raridades X =

Studio album by Xuxa
- Released: 24 September 2024
- Length: 39:40
- Label: Som Livre

Xuxa chronology
ABC do XSPB (2016)	Raridades X (2024)

Raridades X is the thirty-seventh studio album by Brazilian TV host and singer Xuxa, released by Som Livre on 24 September 2024. This is Xuxa's first album in eight years and also the first not to be part of the Só Para Baixinhos series (XSPB) since 2000. The album features ten songs that were recorded but never previously released.

== Background ==
Eight years after the album XSPB 13, Xuxa announced on her social media that she had signed a new contract with the record label Som Livre, resulting in the album Raridades X. This project features a collection of songs she recorded for previous albums but which had never been released before. Comprising 10 songs, the album was released on digital platforms on September 24, 2024. She explained, "This album was not something I thought of as a return to my musical career, but rather as a way to show affection to many fans who grew up with me. It is for this audience that I never want to stop doing something."

In addition to the new release, Xuxa was honored by the record label with a commemorative frame in recognition of 10 billion views of her songs on streaming services.

== Track listing ==
Raridades X track listing
No.	Title	Length
1.	"Ilha Deserta"	4:03
2.	"Com Amor"	3:38
3.	"Astronauta de Papel"	4:44
4.	"Você Caiu Do Céu"	4:14
5.	"Chefinho Mandou"	4:39
6.	"Litoral"	3:33
7.	"Amigo Especial"	3:31
8.	"Defensores da Natureza"	4:07
9.	"Pé No Chão"	3:26
10.	"Doce Mel (Bom Estar Com Você) – 1988"	3:04
Total length:		39:40
