= Xuxa só para Baixinhos 13 – ABC do XSPB =

ABC do XSPB

Studio album by Xuxa
- Released: December 16, 2016
- Recorded: 2014
- Genre: Children's music
- Length: 53:22
- Label: Som Livre
- Producer: Luiz Cláudio Moreira; Mônica Muniz

Xuxa chronology
Era Uma Vez Vol. 2 (2014)	ABC do XSPB (2016)	Raridades X (2024)

Xuxa só para Baixinhos 13 or ABC do XSPB (also known as XSPB 13) (transl. Only For Children Thirteen - Alphabet) is the thirty-sixth studio album by Brazilian recording artist Xuxa Meneghel, released on December 16, 2016, as the thirteenth and last album in the Só Para Baixinhos collection and as her first (in eight years) and only album to be released through Som Livre.

== Release and content ==
Xuxa só para Baixinhos 13 was originally set to be released two years earlier but its release date was postponed several times (some claimed the reason was due to the singer's departure from her former television station TV Globo, and also current owner of the singer's Som Livre). The fans of the singer even promoted campaigns for the release of XSPB 13. From comments on the official site of the record company on Facebook, file complaints on the 'Claim Here' website and even fill in the email boxes of the record company team. The album had been nominated for the seventh time to the 17th Annual Latin Grammy Awards, but in order to compete and be considered for the prize, the DVD should have been released until October 31. The album was finally released on December 16, 2016, in CD and DVD format, without even a modification in the list of tracks of the two formats. The album marks the return of the presenter to her former record company Som Livre.

Xuxa só para Baixinhos 13 contains unpublished songs, the project teaches the alphabet in a light and fun way, allowing children to know more about each letter.

== Track listing ==
All tracks are written by Bozzo Barretti, Elias Caetano, Fábio Caetano, Junno Andrade and Marcelo Barbosa.

Xuxa só para Baixinhos 11 – DVD and CD release
No.	Title	Length
1.	"Abc do Xspb"	1:14
2.	"Letra A"	1:35
3.	"Letra B"	0:59
4.	"Letra C"	1:20
5.	"Letra D"	1:14
6.	"Letra E"	1:15
7.	"Letra F"	0:48
8.	"Letra G"	0:53
9.	"Letra H"	1:58
10.	"Letra I"	1:16
11.	"Letra J"	1:25
12.	"Letra K"	1:19
13.	"Letra L"	0:58
14.	"Letra M"	1:20
15.	"Letra N"	2:12
16.	"Letra O"	1:48
17.	"Letra P"	0:55
18.	"Letra Q"	1:23
19.	"Letra R"	0:49
20.	"Letra S"	1:27
21.	"Letra T"	0:47
22.	"Letra U"	1:38
23.	"Letra V"	1:38
24.	"Letra W"	1:26
25.	"Letra X"	1:06
26.	"Letra Y"	1:27
27.	"Letra Z"	1:12
Total length:		53:22
