= Xuxa só para Baixinhos 7 – Brincadeiras =

Xuxa só para Baixinhos Vol. 7 – Brincadeiras

Studio album by Xuxa
- Released: July 7, 2007
- Recorded: 2007
- Genre: Children's music
- Length: 58:44
- Label: Som Livre
- Producers: Mônica Muniz; Luiz Claudio Moreira

Xuxa chronology
Xuxa 20 Anos (2006)	Xuxa só para Baixinhos Vol. 7 – Brincadeiras (2007)	Xuxa Festa – Ao Vivo (2008)

Singles from Xuxa Só para Baixinhos 7
- 1. "Pique Alto" Released: 2007; 2. "Dança da Cadeira" Released: 2007; 3. "Bambolê" Released: 2007

Xuxa só para Baixinhos 7 – Brincadeiras (also known as XSPB 7) (transl. Only For Children Seven - Play) is the thirtieth studio album by Brazilian recording artist Xuxa, released on July 7, 2007, by Som Livre as the seventh album in the collection Só Para Baixinhos.

== Release and reception ==
Xuxa só para Baixinhos 7 - Brincadeiras was released on July 7, 2007 by Som Livre. The album sold another 50,000 copies, reaching the 8th position of the bestselling DVDs in the year 2007. The singles were "Pique Alto", "Dança da Cadeira" and "Bambolê". The album was also released in a premium kit, which came with the CD, DVD Gifts, the gifts are three games: Board Game and Memory Game. At the end of 2014, XSPBs 6, 7 and 8 were released on Blu-ray by Som Livre.

== Tour ==
The XSPB 7 tour was scheduled for 2008, shortly after the end of the Xuxa Festa tour in May 2008, however the project was canceled and the Xuxa Festa tour continued until October 2009 in November 2007, Xuxa arrived singing excerpts from the songs of XSPB 7 on the tour as "Pique-Alto" and talked to the audience as she wanted it to go on tour.

== Track listing ==
Xuxa só para Baixinhos 7 – CD edition
No.	Title	Writer(s)	Length
1.	"Pique Alto"	Vanessa Alves; Ary Sperling; Leonardo Sperling	1:54
2.	"Bobinho"	Vanessa Alves; Ary Sperling	2:08
3.	"Bambolê"	Leandro Barros; Kátia Pereira	2:11
4.	"Dança da Cadeira"	Vanessa Alves; Maurício Gaetani	2:10
5.	"Pula Corda"	Chico Roque; Ed Wilson	2:25
6.	"Dança da Laranja"	Leandro Barros; Fred Pereira; Vanessa Alves	2:15
7.	"Cabo de Guerra"	Leandro Barros; Fred Pereira; Vanessa Alves	1:36
8.	"Bola Com a Boca"	Vanessa Alves; Ary Sperling; Leandro Sperling	2:01
9.	"Pedra, Papel e Tesoura"	Vanessa Alves, Ary Sperling e Rafael Sperling	2:14
10.	"Morto-Vivo"	Vanessa Alves; Ary Sperling; Rogério Meanda	1:56
11.	"Amarelinha" (Pulando Pulando)	Zé Henrique; Fred Pereira	2:46
12.	"Salada Mista"	Álvaro Socci; Cláudio Matta	2:04
13.	"Gato Mia"	Vanessa Alves; Maurício Gaetani	1:54
14.	"A Linda Rosa Juvenil" (sung by Sasha Meneghel Szafir)	D. P.	1:38
15.	"Brincar de Sonhar" (sung by Alyriana Kellen Miranda Guedes and Eduarda dos Santos Menezes)	Vanessa Alves; Ary Sperling	4:06
Total length:			33:18

Xuxa só para Baixinhos 7 – DVD Edition
No.	Title	Writer(s)	Length
1.	"Introdução"		0:44
2.	"Bambolê"	Leandro Barros; Kátia Pereira	2:16
3.	"Passage (Xuxinha and Guto: Saco Racing)"		0:35
4.	"Dança da Laranja"	Leandro Barros; Fred Pereira; Vanessa Alves	2:19
5.	"Passage (Xuxinha and Guto: Egg Racing)"		0:28
6.	"Pedra, Papel e Tesoura"	Vanessa Alves; Ary Sperling; Rafael Sperling	2:18
7.	"Passage (Xuxinha and Guto: Hash)"		0:32
8.	"Morto-Vivo"	Vanessa Alves; Ary Sperling; Rogério Meanda	1:59
9.	"Passage (Little Dolls)"		0:32
10.	"Pula Corda"	Chico Roque; Ed Wilson	2:29
11.	"Passage (Xuxinha and Guto: Pass rope)"		1:00
12.	"Dança da Cadeira"	Vanessa Alves; Maurício Gaetani	2:14
13.	"Passage (Xuxinha and Guto: Pushcart)"		0:28
14.	"Cabo de Guerra"	Leandro Barros; Fred Pereira; Vanessa Alves	1:42
15.	"Passage (Xuxinha and Guto: Force)"		1:04
16.	"Amarelinha" (Pulando Pulando)	Zé Henrique; Fred Pereira	2:50
17.	"Passage (Xuxinha and Guto: Boas Race)"		0:47
18.	"Bola Com a Boca"	Vanessa Alves; Ary Sperling; Leandro Sperling	2:04
19.	"Passage (Xuxinha and Guto: Boom ball)"		0:21
20.	"Pique Alto"	Vanessa Alves; Ary Sperling; Leonardo Sperling	1:58
21.	"Passage (Xuxinha and Guto: Snake)"		0:26
22.	"Bobinho"	Vanessa Alves; Ary Sperling	2:12
23.	"Passage (Xuxinha and Guto: Cat's bed)"		0:44
24.	"Salada Mista"	Álvaro Socci; Cláudio Matta	2:08
25.	"Passage (Xuxinha and Guto: Ring Pass)"		0:43
26.	"A Linda Rosa Juvenil" (sung by Sasha Meneghel Szafir)	D. P.	1:38
27.	"Passage (Xuxinha and Guto: Blind goat)"		0:43
28.	"Gato Mia"	Vanessa Alves; Maurício Gaetani	2:10
29.	"Passage (Xuxinha and Guto: Blink)"		0:41
30.	"Brincar de Sonhar" (sung by Alyriana Kellen Miranda Guedes and Eduarda Dos Santos Menezes)	Vanessa Alves; Ary Sperling	4:06
31.	"Credits"		15:46
Total length:			58:44

== Personnel ==
- Art Direction: Xuxa Meneghel
- Direction: Paulo de Barros
- Cinematography: André Horta
- Producers: Luiz Cláudio Moreira and Mônica Muniz
- Musical production: Ary Sperling
- CD Mastering: Evren Göknar
- Production Director: Junior Porto
- Production assistant: Mariana de Aquino
- Cover and Ente: Felipe Gois
- Set design: Lueli Antunes
- Characters: Bila Bilu, Txutxucão, Ratinha Rosa, Ratinha Amarela, Ratinho Azul, Xuxinha and Guto

== Certifications ==
Region	Certification	Certified units/sales
Brazil (Pro-Música Brasil) DVD	Platinum	50,000^{*}
Brazil (Pro-Música Brasil)	Gold	50,000^{‡}
^{*} Sales figures based on certification alone.^{‡} Sales+streaming figures based on certification alone.
