= Sasha Meneghel =

Brazilian model

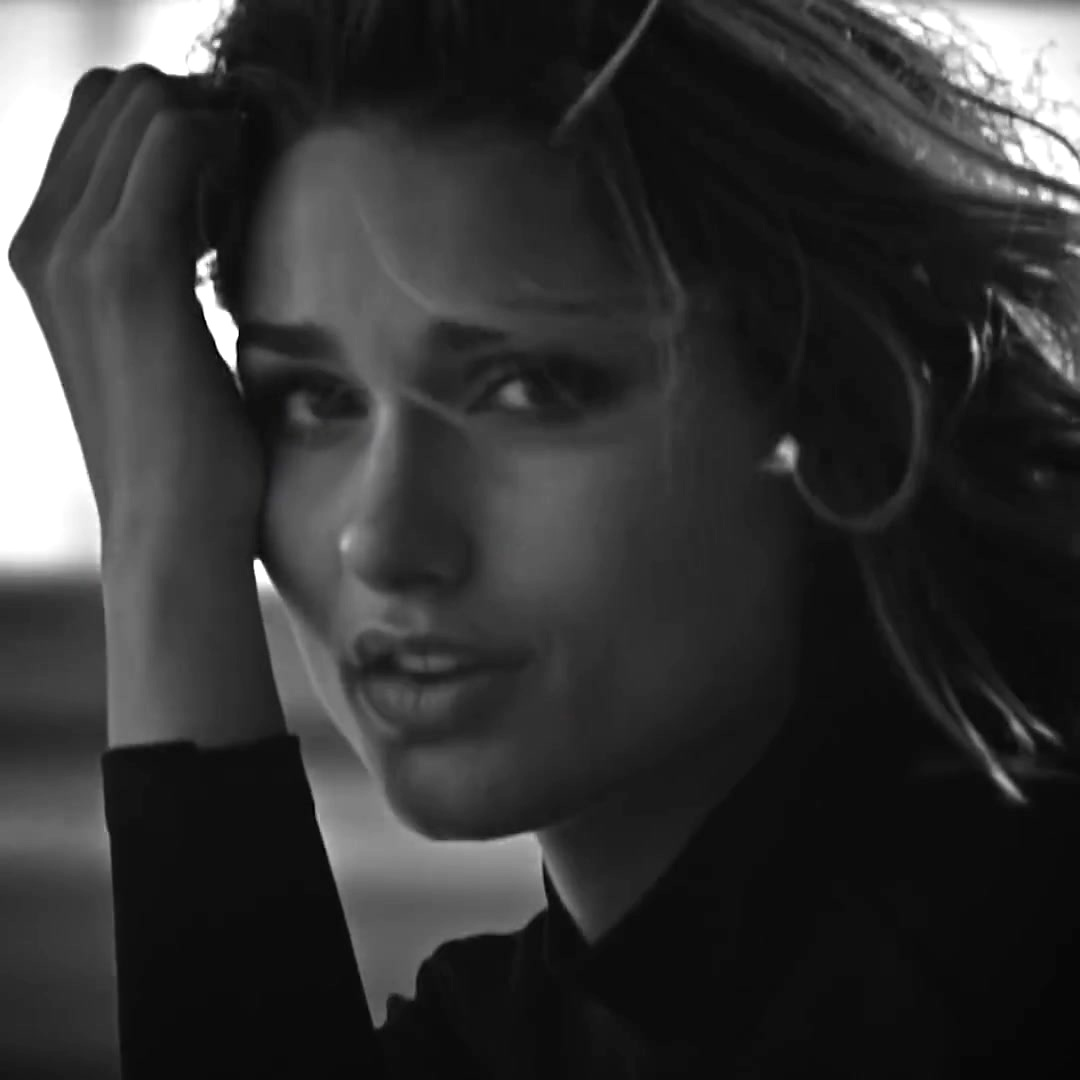
- Meneghel in 2019
- Born: Sasha Meneghel Szafir; 28 July 1998 (age 28); Rio de Janeiro, Brazil
- Occupation: Model
- Years active: 2005–present
- Spouse: João Figueiredo (m. 2021)
- Parents: Luciano Szafir; Xuxa
- Modeling information
- Height: 1.74 m (5 ft 9 in)
- Hair color: Blonde
- Eye color: Brown
- Agency: Way Model Management

Sasha Meneghel Szafir Figueiredo (born 28 July 1998) is a Brazilian model.

== Biography ==
Meneghel was born in Rio de Janeiro. She is the only child of TV host, singer and businesswoman Xuxa Meneghel and Luciano Szafir.

She grew up in the spotlight, having her first minutes of life displayed by Rede Globo's prime time news program Jornal Nacional. Her birth became the most documented in the history of Brazil, according to magazine Veja.

Meneghel appeared in programs presented by her mother including Xuxa só para Baixinhos. In 2009 she starred in her first feature film in Xuxa em O Mistério de Feiurinha, directed by Tizuka Yamasaki.

Meneghel was a volleyball player for the team of Clube de Regatas do Flamengo. In 2011, she was invited by CBV (Brazilian Volleyball Confederation) for a period of training with the Brazilian national team Sub-19.

== Personal life ==
In 2016, Meneghel finished high school at the American School of Rio de Janeiro, and then moved to New York and began studying at the Parsons School of Design.

== Filmography ==
=== Film ===
| Year | Title | Role |
|---|---|---|
| 1999 | Xuxa Requebra | Young Helena |
| 2009 | Xuxa em O Mistério de Feiurinha | Feiurinha |

=== Television ===
| Year | Title |
|---|---|
| 2003-04 | Xuxa no Mundo da Imaginação |
