= Xuxa em O Mistério de Feiurinha =

2009 film directed by Tizuka Yamasaki

- Promotional poster
- Directed by: Tizuka Yamasaki
- Written by: Gabriela Amaral
- Based on: O Fantástico Mistério de Feiurinha by Pedro Bandeira
- Produced by: Xuxa Meneghel; Mônica Muniz; Luiz Cláudio Lopes Moreira
- Starring: Xuxa Meneghel; Sasha Meneghel; Bernardo Mesquita; Daniele Valente; Luciano Szafir; Bruna Marquezine; Angélica; Hebe Camargo
- Cinematography: Andre Horta
- Music by: Deborah Blando; Mu Carvalho; Maurício Manieri
- Production companies: Conspiração Filmes; Globo Filmes; PlayArte; Xuxa Produções (co-production)
- Distributed by: PlayArte
- Release date: December 25, 2009
- Running time: 85 minutes
- Country: Brazil
- Language: Portuguese
- Budget: R$ 1 million
- Box office: R$ 4.7 million

Xuxa em O Mistério de Feiurinha (English: Xuxa in the Feiurinha' Mystery) is a children's film directed by Tizuka Yamasaki and starring Xuxa Meneghel. It is adapted from the book O Fantástico Mistério de Feiurinha, written by Pedro Bandeira.

Famous princesses of books and classic films such as Snow White, Cinderella, Sleeping Beauty, Rapunzel and Belle are convened when Little Red Riding Hood announced the disappearance of princess Feiurinha. To save the kingdom in which they live, they decide to embark on a journey to find Feiurinha.

The cast also features the participation of Luciano Szafir, Sasha Meneghel, Fafy Siqueira, Angelica, Luciano Huck, Hebe Camargo, Daniele Valente and Bernardo Mesquita. The theme song is Do You Believe in Magic, performed by Lulu Santos and Xuxa.

== Plot ==
In the enchanted world, princes and princesses live in peace until one of the characters disappears mysteriously. Feiurinha (Sasha Meneghel), a little-known princess disappears and nobody knows how to find her. Cinderella (Xuxa Meneghel), Rapunzel (Angélica), Snow White (Daniele Valente), Little Red Riding Hood (Samantha Schmutz), and Belle (Lavínia Vlasak), are all extremely worried about the fact, since when one of them disappears, all risk disappearing. The only way to find her is by telling her story, but no one remembers.

So, Cinderella reunites her friends for a difficult mission. They must go to the real world to find someone who can tell the story of Feiurinha. There, they meet the writer Pedro (Antônio Pedro Borges), who suffers from a creative block and can not do much for them. With the help of the children João and Maria, Pedro's nephews, they search the Internet for someone who knows the missing princess, but they can not find a clue.

== Cast ==
- Sasha Meneghel as Feiurinha
- Xuxa Meneghel as Cinderella
- Bernardo Mesquita as Prince of Feiurinha
- Luciano Szafir as Prince of Cinderella
- Angélica as Rapunzel
- Daniele Valente as Snow White
- Lavínia Vlasak as Belle
- Simone Soares as Sleeping Beauty
- Samantha Schmutz as Little Red Riding Hood
- Hebe Camargo as Queen mother
- Bruna Marquezine as Witch Belezinha
- Fafy Siqueira as Witch Malvada
- Alexandra Richter as Witch Ruim
- Ana Ribeiro as Witch Pior Ainda
- Paulo Gustavo as Caio Lacaio
- Luciano Huck as Prince of Rapunzel
- Daniela Dondo as Confúcia
- Leandro Hassum as Genius
- Lesliana Pereira as Fairy
- Antônio Pedro Borges as Pedro Bandeira
- Zezé Motta as Jerusa
- Rafael Miguel as João
- Raquel Bonfante as Maria
- Thiago Jose as Ship's Boy
- André Marques as Edson
- Karla Dalvi as Mother of Feiurinha

== Production ==
In his 19th film and marks important news. For the first time, Xuxa Meneghel works on a literary adaptation and the author is Pedro Bandeira, an editorial phenomenon for children and youth in Brazil. Banner has sold more than 23 million books. Xuxa, this time, is not the protagonist of the story itself. She plays Cinderella. The Feiurinha of the title, debuting in the cinema, is its daughter Sasha Meneghel. It was the daughter, moreover, who presented Pedro Bandeira to his mother.

"The story of the film was taken from the book written by the Brazilian Monteiro Lobato, who portrays the lives of people who lived in an enchanted world and passed into real life."

Xuxa said that at the insistence of author Pedro Bandeira he found that his daughter, Sasha, played the part. But she did not watch her daughter's recordings, because she was "very nervous". Beside the two, Luciano Szafir did not restrain his tears when watching the film for the first time. "I did not know how to handle it. When I saw footage of Sasha, I cried about five times," he confided. The actor, who plays the nearsighted and amusing prince of Cinderella, role of Xuxa, also lives a wanderer, father of Feiurinha, made by his heiress. "I wanted to do any scene next to Sasha, I could be a beggar, just to get through it," he said, who said he was impressed by his daughter's performance. "If she did not know, she would not believe that she had never done a job as an actress," he said proudly. The film marks the second partnership of Luciano and Xuxa in theaters. The two had already worked on Xuxa and the Goblins in 2002. Directed by Tizuka Yamazaki and written by Gabriela Amaral, the film counts on the participation of Brazilian artists like Angélica, Luciano Huck. The film also counts on the participation of the late TV hots Hebe Camargo who commented on his participation of working with Xuxa "I have very proud to be friends with Xuxa. She develops a barbaric work for the children in her foundation [Xuxa Menenghel], as well as doing incredible things on TV and in the movies. I'm in this movie for her," said Hebe.

== Release ==
The first pre-premiere of the film took place on a cruise on 12 and 13 December. The route of the ship was: Rio de Janeiro-Búzios-Santos. The premiere of the film took place on December 19, 2009, in Rio de Janeiro, The release took place on December 25, 2009, in 216 rooms throughout Brazil. In Angola, was released on 24 January 2010. In the U.S. state of Florida, the launch took place on April 16, 2010.

== Reception ==
=== Critical response ===
Xuxa em O Mistério de Feiurinha received negative acclaim from critics, the film was mostly criticized for its script and bad performances, but some performances were praised by critics. On Cineweb, he gave the film a star, AdoroCinema, which assigns a weighted average score, has a score of 2.6 based on 11 reviews, having received three and a half stars out of five. The Filmow, gave three stars of five to the film.

The Cineclick wrote that "The performances are mediocre: Xuxa is always the same, the debutant Sasha tries, but luckily her role is small and it does not make much difference if she is bad or not, but Luciano Szafir is ashamed. exception is Zezé Motta, who is a talented actress who even in the role of assistant of the writer, can illuminate, on the scene, even this poor movie. Túlio Moreira of Cinema com Rapadura, gave a first note to the film, defining it as "a legitimate case of cinematic nepotism", writing "Xuxa summons her patron of hots, singers, ex-boyfriends and celebrities of the moment to compose a mise-en-scène absolutely fond of content and absurdly worried about sizing the screen for the ego of personalities of the so-called Brazilian television culture. If the theme is interesting by showing the princess routine, its illusions and achievements after the "happily ever after," any chance of developing this context is useless after the first bouts of starry on the film." Mateus Nagime of Cineplayers, gave Xuxa in Feiurinha's, note 1.5 and a star, writing that "All celebrities play the role of "I'm here on the screen, do not demand talent." Sasha, however, overcomes all barriers. does not have a facial expression and much less talent, a characteristic that he inherited from his mother, who has already been caged with bad performances since Love Strange Love (1982) three decades ago, or his father, who probably has one of the worst performances in film history in this film. completed his criticism by writing that "The scenes are poorly structured. In the first part it counts on a band of princess screaming and talking at the same time, trying to evoke laughs, whereas in the history of Feiurinha, Sasha Meneghel can not transmit the smallest charisma, besides being totally false to have still compassion with the witches who are to arrest for more than ten years.

Ana Martinelli of R7, describes the film as full of "cliches, obvious dialogues and repetitions" and says that "a poor resource was no longer enough, the princesses are no longer in their prime. justification for the writer to live on a ship is some sponsor's requirement. Author of the book O Fantástico Mistério de Feiurinha, that was adapted for the cinema by Xuxa, the writer Pedro Bandeira affirmed to the newspaper Folha de S.Paulo that Sasha - hots daughter who lives the title role in the film - has no talent at all." Following publication, Bandeira denied the claim, claiming that the publication was distorted.

=== Box office ===
The Ministry of Culture released the production company Conspiração Filmes to raise until the end of the year R$6.4 million in resources via Law Rouanet to O Mistério de Feiurinha. The final budget of the film was 1.5 million reais and grossed a total gross of R$ 4 million. The film was the seventh mai seen in Brazil in 2010.
