= Xuxa =

Brazilian presenter, actress, singer and former model (born 1963)

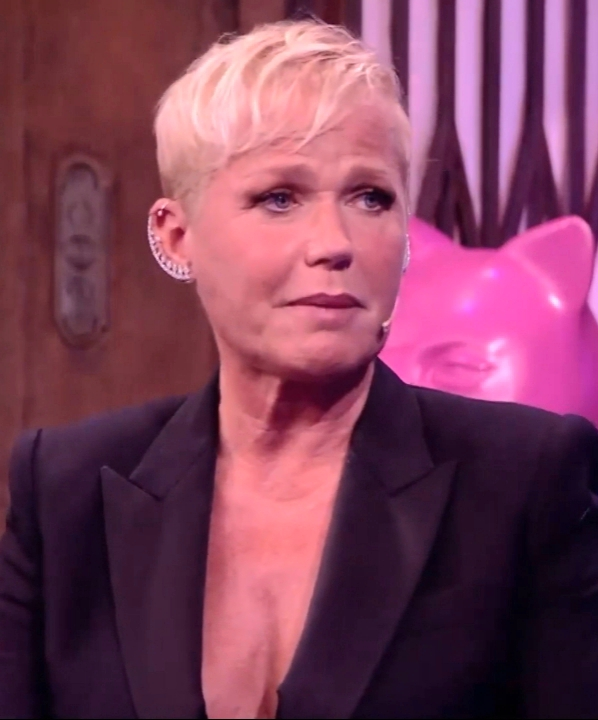
- Xuxa in 2020
- Born: Maria da Graça Meneghel; 27 March 1963 (age 63); Santa Rosa, Rio Grande do Sul, Brazil
- Other name: Queen of Little Ones
- Citizenship: Brazil; Italy
- Occupations: TV host; singer; actress; model; businesswoman
- Years active: 1982–present
- Partners: Pelé (1981–1986); Ayrton Senna (1988–1990); Luciano Szafir (1997–2002); Junno Andrade (2012–present)
- Children: Sasha Meneghel
- Musical career
- Genres: Pop; dance; Children's music
- Instrument: Vocals
- Labels: Som Livre; Sony Music; RCA; PolyGram; Philips; Xuxa Produções
- Website: xuxa.com

Signature
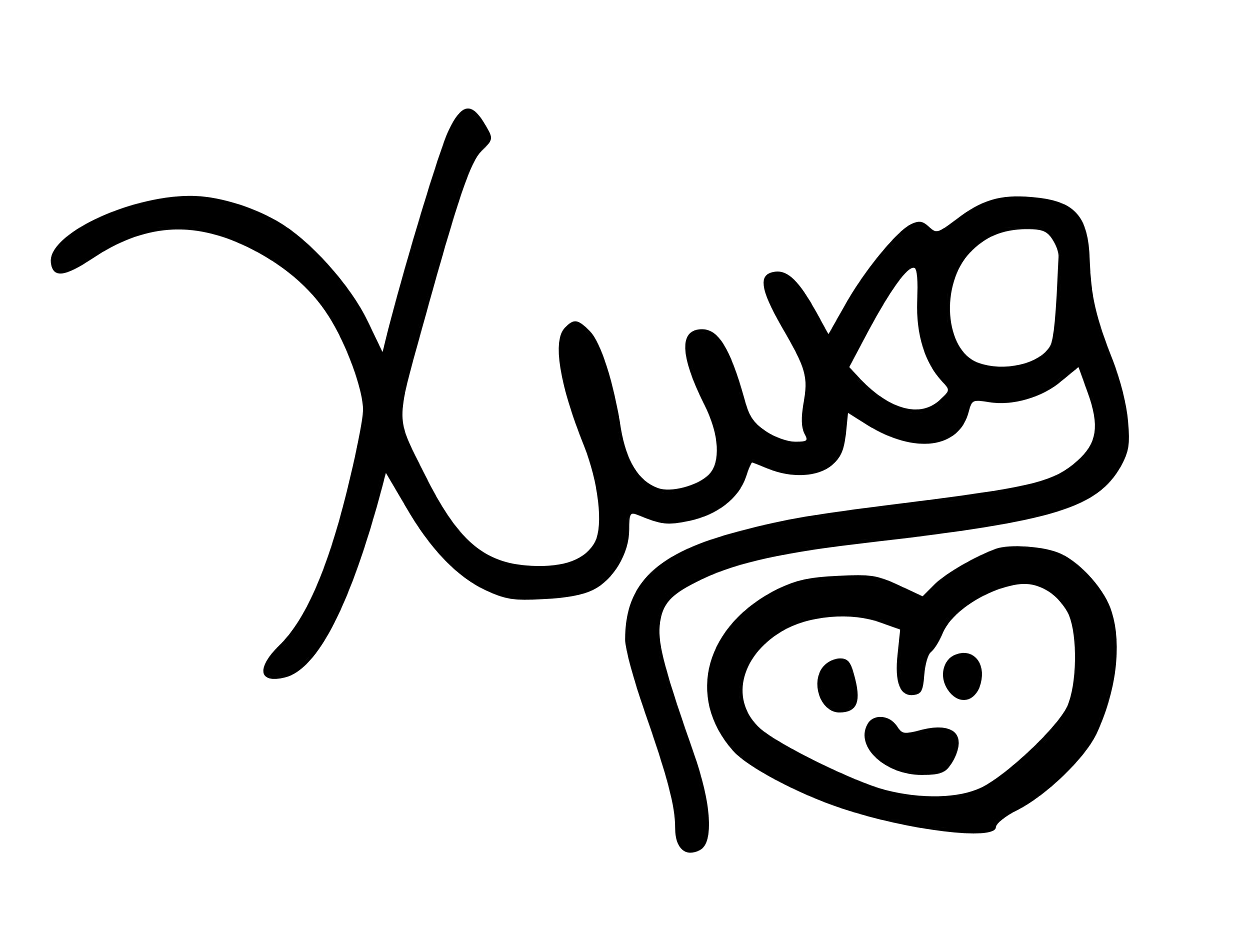

Maria da Graça Xuxa Meneghel (/ˈʃuːʃə/ SHOO-shə, Brazilian Portuguese: [maˈɾi.ɐ da ˈɡɾasɐ ˈʃuʃɐ mẽneˈɡɛw]; born Maria da Graça Meneghel on 27 March 1963) is a Brazilian TV host, actress, singer, and businesswoman. Nicknamed "The Queen of Children", (Note: Portuguese: Rainha dos Baixinhos, lit. 'Queen of the Little Ones') Xuxa built the largest Latin and South American children's entertainment empire. In the early 1990s, she presented television programs in Brazil, Argentina, Spain and the United States simultaneously, reaching around 20 million viewers daily. According to different sources, the singer's sales range between 30 and 50 million copies.

In 2025, the record label Som Livre, with which the artist recorded almost all of her albums, gave her an award for her more than 28 million copies sold only in Brazil, during her career, and 10 billion streams to date. Her net worth was estimated at US$100 million in the early 1990s. Also successful as a businesswoman, she has the highest net worth of any Brazilian female entertainer, estimated at US$400 million.

== Early life and education ==
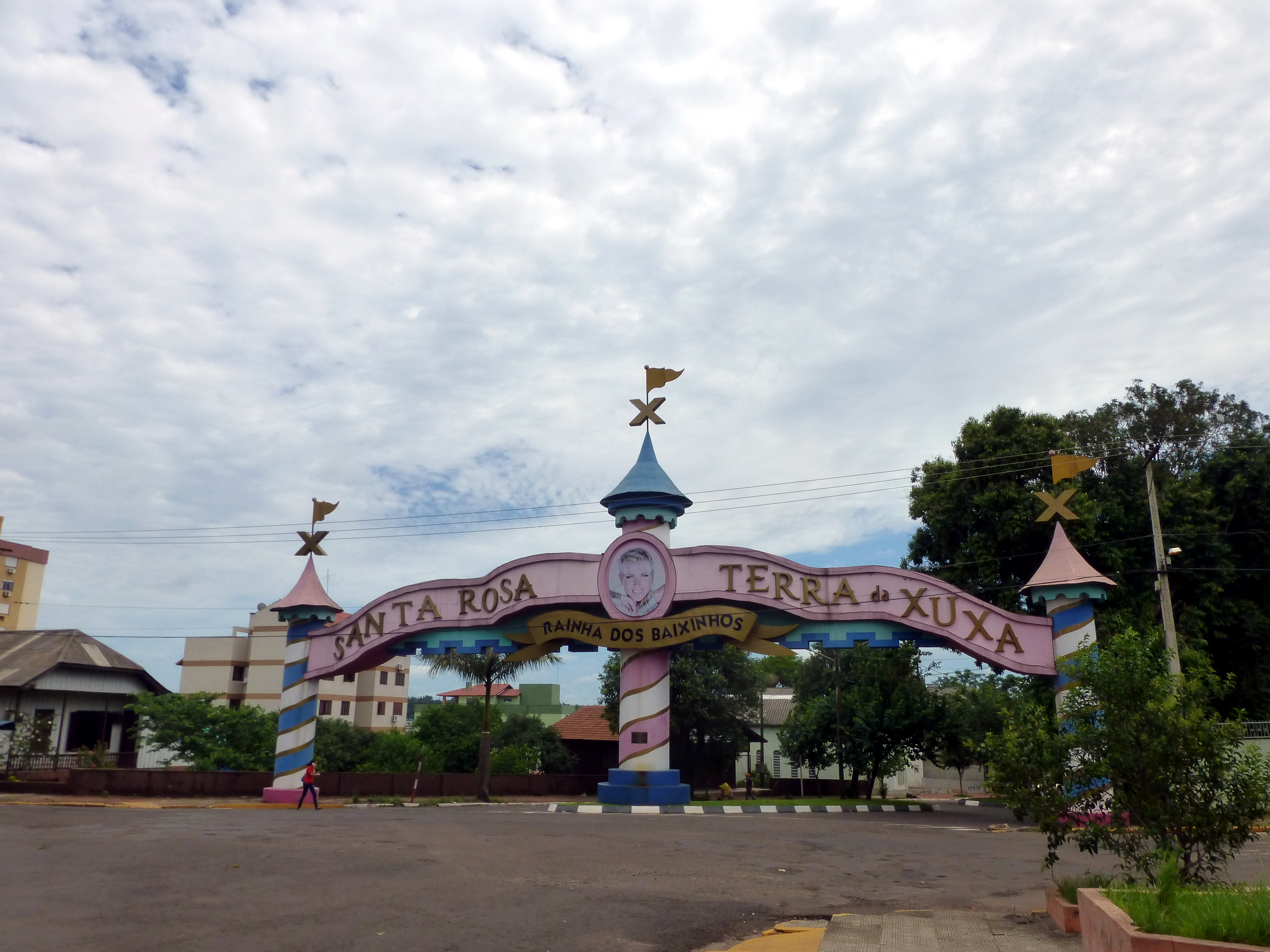
Portico da Xuxa in Santa Rosa, Rio Grande do Sul

Maria da Graça Meneghel was born in Santa Rosa, Rio Grande do Sul, to Alda (née Flores da Rocha) and Luís Floriano Meneghel. Xuxa is of Italian and Polish descent on her paternal side and of German, Swiss and Portuguese descent on her maternal side. Her paternal great-grandfather emigrated to Brazil from the northern Italian town of Imer, in the region of Trentino-Alto Adige/Südtirol, around the end of the 19th century. In 2013, Xuxa obtained Italian citizenship by jus sanguinis.

During Xuxa's birth, her father was told that both mother and child were at risk. He opted to save his wife, and prayed to Our Lady of Graces, promising to name his daughter after the Blessed Virgin Mary if all went well. Although she was named for the Virgin as promised, Xuxa, the youngest member of the Meneghel family, received her famous nickname from her brother, Bladimir. When their mother arrived home with the baby, she said to him, "Look at the baby that I bought to play with you", and he replied, "I know, it's my Xuxa." The nickname stuck, though it was not until 1988 that she officially changed her name to Maria da Graça Xuxa Meneghel.

Xuxa spent her early years in her hometown of Santa Rosa. When she was seven, she and her family moved to Rio de Janeiro where they lived in the Bento Ribeiro neighborhood. At 15 years old, she was discovered by a modeling agency, and began her professional career as a model at 16. During this time period Xuxa modeled in Brazil and the United States for both fashion and men's magazines, such as Playboy, and began an affair with Brazilian retired footballer Pelé. In 1984, she was hired as a model by Ford Models.

== Career ==
=== 1983–1986: A beginning by chance at Rede Manchete ===
Xuxa started a career in television through an offer to host a children's program, Clube da Criança, in the newly created Rede Manchete which was the sixth broadcaster to have national reach in Brazil. In this period, she worked as a model during the week in New York City and taped her show during the weekends in Rio de Janeiro. The program's reach gradually increased and she began to receive proposals from other broadcasters, until in 1986, she ended up accepting one made by Rede Globo de Televisão to present a new children's program that would bear her name.

=== 1986–1992: Xou da Xuxa and breakthrough ===
On 30 June 1986, Xou da Xuxa debuted on TV Globo. It aired in the mornings from Monday to Saturday until its final episode on 31 December 1992, after some 2,000 episodes. Xuxa would usually enter on a pink ship, which awakened in the children the dream of flying beside her. Children from all over Brazil ran to have breakfast with the song "Quem Qué Pão?" She would end the show with the famous "Xuxa kiss", where she would put on bright lipstick and kiss the children onstage with her and children in the audience on the cheek, leaving a mark. In addition to entertainment, she also aired positive messages to the public, such as "Want, Power and Reach!", "Believe in Dreams" and "Drugs do Bad". In Christmas 1986, Xuxa received her eighth platinum record, a prize awarded to every 250,000 copies sold. The album Xou da Xuxa, from the record company Som Livre, had sold more than 2.6 million copies, achieving by then the South American record for a single album. Xuxa sold more than Brazilian singer Roberto Carlos that year.

In the following years, the presenter still released six more albums of the series, such as Xou da Xuxa 2 and 3, which established themselves as the best-selling albums in Brazil, with 3.2 and 5 million copies sold, respectively, the latter being the best-selling album in Brazil. With the recorded songs, it left in tours by Brazil that were seen by millions of people. In 1987, the French newspaper Libération included Xuxa in the list of 10 women of prominence on the planet, next to the British prime minister Margaret Thatcher. In the same period, Xuxa began a relationship with the Brazilian Formula 1 driver Ayrton Senna, who died in 1994. In parallel to the Xou da Xuxa, the presenter commanded Bobeou Dançou, between 9 July and 31 December 1989, on Sunday afternoons of TV Globo. Initially created as Xou of Xuxa frame, it was so successful that the station decided to launch it as an independent program aimed at the adolescent public. The Bobeou Dançou was a program of rumba based on riddles with two teams formed by adolescents between 13 and 17 years disputed the first place of the competition.

In 1990, the film Lua de Cristal, Xuxa's biggest box office hit, sold 4,178 million tickets and ranked 21st in the ranking of most-watched national films from 1970 to 2011 according to Ancine (Agência Nacional do Cinema). Xuxa accumulated the highest-grossing of Brazilian cinema, with more than 37 million people watched her films. She was also chosen by the International Academy of Television Arts and Sciences of the United States to deliver the International Emmy Awards in the category of best children's program and present one of their songs in the awards party. In 1991, Xuxa appeared in 37th place for Forbes among the 40 richest celebrities of that year, with a turnover of $19 million. Xuxa was the first Brazilian to join the list. The Paradão da Xuxa emerged as an independent program after the success of the picture of the same name presented in Xou of Xuxa. The program was aired between 25 April and 26 December 1992 on Saturday mornings of TV Globo, replacing Xou of Xuxa on that day. The program was three hours long, and different singers and musical groups performed on the show. The musical selection went from the samba to the rock, going through the sertanejo music. On the last Saturday of each month, Super Paradão (Vacation Specials) was shown, highlighting the most successful songs of the period.

=== 1991–1993: International career ===
After reaching success with her record sales in her home country, her popularity surpassed the Brazilian market and released her first Spanish-language album, Xuxa 1, which performed well in the Argentine market. Xuxa widened her appeal among Spanish-speaking audiences when she recorded an adapted version for Spanish-speaking markets of Xou da Xuxa, called El Show de Xuxa. The Los Angeles Times reported in 1992 that "more than 20 million Spanish- and Portuguese-speaking children watched El Show de Xuxa in 16 countries of Latin America every day, as well as Univision in the United States. The first two seasons of the show, were produced by main Argentine TV channel Telefé while the third season, held in 1993, was produced independently in Buenos Aires and was sold to El Trece. Her last Spanish speaking show aired in Latin America on 31 December 1993.

The New York Times highlighted her success in Brazil and Argentina in an article by correspondent James Brooke. It also highlighted the record sales of albums of the singer, which in 1990 reached 12 million copies, and its success in the Hispanic market, where it reached 300,000 copies with their first album in Spanish. At the time, she was called by New York magazine as "Latin American Madonna". In 1992, the Los Angeles Times said that Xuxa was "probably better known to most Latin American pre-adolescents than Michael Jackson." In 1992, taping programs in Brazil and Argentina, Xuxa was invited to host the program Xuxa Park in Spain. Released by Telecinco channel, the game show was shown on Sundays, with high ratings, and lasted two years. Her Xuxa Park album sold well for 8 weeks and was certified gold. Billboard magazine published in September 1992, that the album Xuxa 2 was at the top of the Spanish charts, and appeared in position 77 of the 100 most sold albums in the world. The biggest hits on this disc were: Loquita Por Ti (#29 on the billboard chart), Luna de Cristal (#35 on the billboard chart) and Chindolele (#10 on the billboard chart). The album reached the fifth position in the U.S. Billboard Top Latin Albums of 1991. In 1992, People magazine chose Xuxa as one of the 50 most beautiful people in the world.

In 1993, Xuxa hosted an English-language series in the United States titled Xuxa (which was produced by MTM Enterprises). Broadcast by a pool of 100 stations and with an average of 3 million viewers per episode, significant numbers, Xuxa lasted only one season on The Family Channel (renamed Freeform in 2018), remaining on the air between 1993 and 1996, including reruns. It was initially broadcast by 124 stations across the country. The shows were produced on Sound Stage 36 at CBS Television City in Los Angeles. Sixty-five episodes were taped for the first season of the show. Taping of the episodes was done in a 5-week period in the summer of 1993. The shows were broadcast Monday through Friday, generally in the early morning or mid-afternoon. All 65 episodes were broadcast during the initial 13 weeks before there was a repeat. Helping Xuxa on the show were the Pixies (three U.S. "Paquitas" plus one Brazilian Paquita), the Mellizas (uncredited), Jelly, Jam, and ten "child wranglers" for 150 kids on the set. Starting in September 1994, Xuxa began airing on The Family Channel cable network, at 8:00 am ET/PT. They reprised original episodes on a new children's block until 19 February 1996 when Xuxa stopped airing on The Family Channel. The show was sold to other countries including Japan, Israel, Russia, Australia, Romania and some Arab states. Her international ambitions apparently ended after the grueling taping schedule for her American show. She was hospitalized for several days due to exhaustion, and decided to give up her international career. In the U.S., Sony Wonder released two of her videos and a record that includes English translations of some of her most successful songs in Portuguese and Spanish.

=== 1994–2000: Weekend shows ===
After some serious health problems due to an overload of work, Xuxa decided to return to work exclusively in the Brazilian market. The presenter returned to her children's audience with Xuxa Park, the Brazilian version of a project of the same name that commanded in Spain. Some elements of the Xou da Xuxa remained, others were modified or completely removed, but still present. The program also directed by Marlene Mattos and gathered games, specials and musical attractions was exhibited between 4 June 1994 and 6 January 2001 on Saturday mornings of TV Globo. The show was canceled abruptly due to a fire that occurred on 11 January 2001 in the recording of its carnival special.

In parallel to Xuxa Park, Xuxa hosted Xuxa Hits between 8 January and 16 April 1995 on Sunday afternoons on TV Globo. The program came as a picture of Xuxa Park, but became an independent program due to its great success. In attraction, Xuxa received several musical attractions like bands, DJs and singers. After its end, the program returned to be only a painting of the Xuxa Park. Inspired by Xuxa Hits, the Planeta Xuxa was created, and premiered on 5 April 1997. Initially, Planeta Xuxa was shown on TV Globo's Saturday afternoons, so Xuxa presented two shows simultaneously on the same day, as Xuxa Park occupied the broadcasters' mornings. From 19 April 1998, the program began to be presented on Sunday afternoons due to the 1998 World Cup, remaining on Sundays until its end in 2002. Planeta Xuxa was focused on the performances of musicians and bands. The program had the format of a discoteque, had the participation of the public and received famous guests. The attraction came to an end on 28 July 2002, due to Xuxa's desire to return to children's television and the end of the partnership with director Marlene Mattos.

=== 2001–2014: Xuxa no Mundo da Imaginação and TV Xuxa ===
As a mother, Xuxa noticed a shortage of videos for small children. In 2001, she designed the Só Para Baixinhos audiovisual and the CD and DVD set. The album Só Para Baixinhos 2 received worldwide recognition and won the 2002 Latin Grammy Award for Best Latin Children's Album category. With the success of the Xuxa project for Baixinhos, which was aimed at children 0–10 years old, the presenter had the desire to create a program in this educational mold, and on 28 October 2002 she debuted Xuxa no Mundo da Imaginação. The show was broadcast on Monday mornings of TV Globo, marking the return of the presenter the broad daily of the station after the end of Xou da Xuxa. The attraction, about 40 minutes long, was divided into four blocks and had 32 frames displayed alternately throughout the week. Through computer graphics capabilities, Xuxa appeared seated on a globe with a blue background filled with white clouds, and featured 14 pictures that blended entertainment and didactic elements. After many reformulations to reverse the low audience, the program came to an end on 31 December 2004.

In 2003, Xuxa was nominated again to Grammy for Xuxa Só Para Baixinhos 3, and took the second trophy in the same category. On 30 June 2003, she inaugurated an amusement park with her name. Mundo de Xuxa, located in São Paulo, in an area of 12,000 square meters, was the largest indoor amusement park in Latin America and has more than 18 attractions. The Mundo do Xuxa is part of the group of 3 amusement parks that most invoice in Brazil, together the 3 parks made about R$220 million per year. In 2004, for the third consecutive time, she competed with the video Xuxa Só Para Baixinhos 4, in the same category. The 5th edition, Xuxa Circus, became a huge-selling success and was transformed into a show that dragged crowds into theaters. In 2005, the Xuxa Festa, promoted a remix of old hits. The project pleased both the children and the parents who grew up following her career. In 2012, Xuxa is again present in the Latin Grammy as the only Brazilian in the Best Children's Album category, with XSPB 11. This is already the fifth indication of the Xuxa Só Para Baixinhos series.

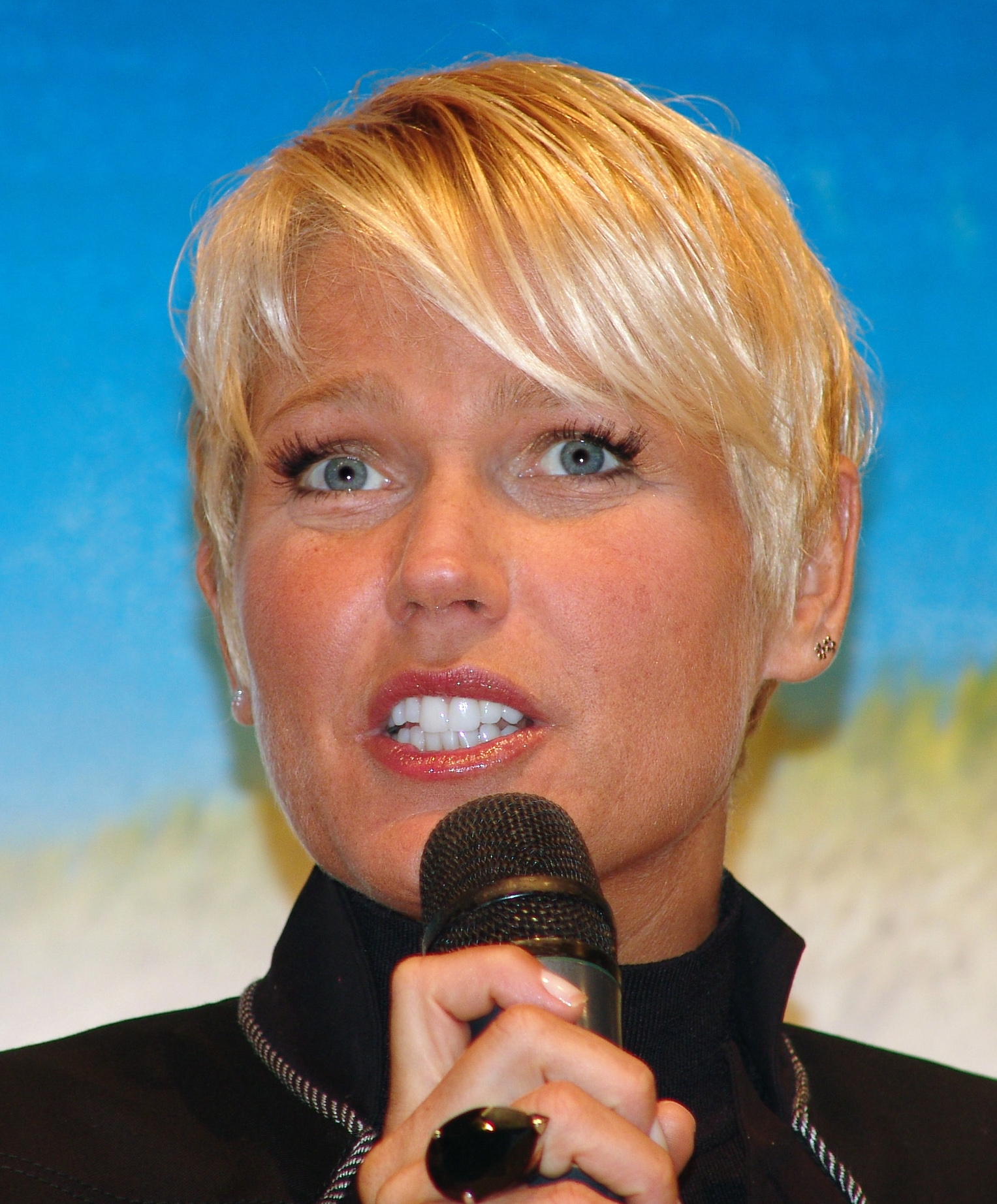
Xuxa in 2006

After successive audience defeats with Xuxa no Mundo da Imaginação, TV Globo reformulated again the attraction commanded by Xuxa that changed its name and age group and on 4 April 2005, it premiered TV Xuxa. The program had two distinct phases and the first was broadcast on Monday morning to the children's audience in a mix of play, dramaturgy, competition, cartoons and musical numbers presentation. The name of the program was an allusion to the fictional TV Xuxa, a television station with several attractions. After many changes for not being able to keep the station in the isolated leadership, the program no longer aired on 31 December 2007. With the success of XSPB, Xuxa released in Argentina, in 2005, the Xuxa audiovisual Solamente para Bajitos.

In parallel to TV Xuxa, the presenter commanded Conexão Xuxa between 2 December 2007 and 11 January 2008. The program had four teams formed by three people (one athlete, one personality and one teenager). Together, they faced various kinds of physical evidence and general knowledge in beautiful settings in the country. The program lasted three stages. The teams were divided by colors: yellow, green, blue and orange. The four teams disputed an X of gold, that was worth three points; an X of silver, worth two; or a bronze X, which was worth one point. In all, there were three stages, displayed in seven editions. The two winners of the first stage and the two winners of the second disputed the final of the program. Vencia the group that obtains more points throughout the competition.

TV Xuxa returned to TV Globo grid on 10 May 2008, totally refurbished, aimed at the whole family. With new format and schedule, and different attractions, it became a weekly auditorium program, screened on Saturdays at 10 am. The show ceased to show cartoons, invested in jokes, and Xuxa went on to receive her guests on a stage designed for interviews and musical numbers. In 2009 Xuxa released the film Xuxa em O Mistério de Feiurinha, telling what happens to the princesses after the "Happily Ever After". The film starred Sasha Meneghel in theaters and featured the participation of Hebe Camargo, Luciano Szafir, Luciano Huck, Angelica and others. The film took more than 1,300,000 people to the movies and was released in Brazil, the United States and Angola. In the musical career, Xuxa left to Som Livre, signing with Sony Music. It is estimated that the contract value was R$10 million. Xuxa released the 9th title of the Xuxa Só Para Baixinhos series, titled Natal Mágico, and in 2010 the tenth edition of XSPB, entitled Baixinhos, Bichinhos e Mais, the album sold, in one month, the amount necessary to become the best-selling DVD of 2010 in Brazil. In October 2010 Xuxa gave an interview explaining its break with "Free Sound" the presenter claimed that her then record company, was providing a tight budget for the size of its projects. Also in 2010, Xuxa was chosen as favourite Brazilian singer by the readers of the Argentine newspaper Clarín.

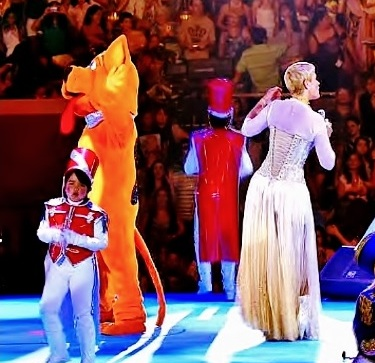
Xuxa performing in 2011

In April 2011, Xuxa launched Mundo da Xuxa program on TV Globo Internacional. The attraction was shown to Brazilian subscribers on every continent from Monday to Friday and shows the best moments of her career on Globo, as well as clips from XSPB. With success in the mornings, the program TV Xuxa was transferred to the afternoons of Saturday in 2011, replacing the Session of Saturday, that suffered to leave the transmitter in the isolated leadership. TV Xuxa finally came to an end on 25 January 2014, due to the health problems of the presenter. In May 2014, after five years in Sony Music, Xuxa returned to Som Livre. In a press release, the label corrected one of the main mistakes in the company's history: "not to keep one of the country's greatest artists".

=== 2015–present: TV Globo exit and new phase ===
On 5 March 2015, after 29 years with TV Globo and off air for over a year with the end of TV Xuxa, Xuxa signed on with Rede Record. Xuxa and TV Globo had amicably broken their contract in December 2014. The arrival of Xuxa in the headquarters of the station was transmitted live by the Program of the Tarde, the station organized one of the biggest events of its history with several links with the fans in the door of its headquarters, in São Paulo, the movement of the employees and the signing of a contract with the presence of the high dome of the broadcaster and journalists of various media, at a press conference specially set up for the blonde at the Teatro Record. This was considered one of the biggest signings in the history of the transmitter, according to sites specialized in TV.

The presenter premiered Xuxa Meneghel, a show of the same name, on 17 August 2015 on RecordTV's Monday night. The program, screened directly from RecNov, was inspired by The Ellen DeGeneres Show, and blended humor, music, interviews, games and special features. The attraction also opened space for the viewer to interact through social networks. Its last episode aired on 19 December 2016. After having its release postponed several times, Som Livre launched in December 2016, the thirteenth volume of Xuxa Só Para Baixinhos. Recorded in 2014, and expected to be released in September 2016, XPSB 13 earned Xuxa a Latin Grammy nomination, but because it was released after the deadline, it was disqualified by the Latin Recording Academy. On 3 April 2017, Xuxa debuted the program Dancing Brasil, a Brazilian version of the American program Dancing with the Stars, produced by Endemol Shine and shown by RecordTV. Xuxa announced the national launch of their new tour of shows, titled XuChá, and based on the traditional tea Chá da Alice. On 6 February 2019, Xuxa also debuted the program The Four Brasil, a Brazilian version of the American program The Four, also produced by the Endemol Shine Group and also shown by RecordTV. In 2023, Globoplay released a documentary about her called "Xuxa, o Documentário".

== Career in music ==
In 1986, the album Xou da Xuxa sold over 2.6 million copies, breaking the South American record for sales, earning eight platinum awards (granted every 250,000 copies sold). In the following years, Xuxa launched seven discs, including Xegundo Xou da Xuxa and Xou da Xuxa 3, and recorded three LPs with the songs translated into Spanish, which sold 6.3 million copies. Xuxa even recorded songs in English, but was never officially released. From 1989 to 1996, Xuxa had sold 18 million albums, a record in Latin American music sales. Xuxa recorded about 915 songs, recorded 28 albums that together have sold over 55 million copies, and were awarded 400 gold records in Brazil. The album, Xou da Xuxa 3, had more than 5,000,000 copies sold, making it the best-selling children's album in the world, according to the Guinness Book.

In 2002, Veja magazine named Xuxa the richest artist in Brazil, with an estimated net worth of $250 million. According to the same magazine, Xuxa's earnings were comparable to Hollywood stars like Julia Roberts and Keanu Reeves. She was first in the list of artists with highest sales over the past ten years (1998–2008). The music video, Xuxa só para Baixinhos sold over eight million copies, and won five nominations and two Latin Grammy awards for "Best Children's Album". In 2012, the Associação Brasileira dos Produtores de Discos (ABPF) released the list of the best-selling DVDs in the country. According to ABPD, Xuxa had two DVDs among the top ten in 2011, XSPB Volume 1–8 (sixth place) and XSPB 11 (ninth).

== Social activism ==
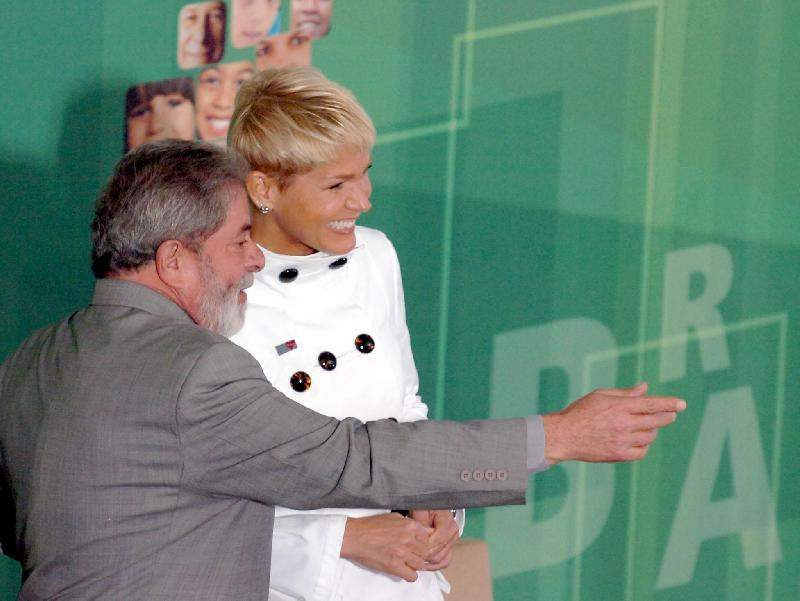
Xuxa with Brazilian President Luiz Inácio Lula da Silva in Brasília in 2007

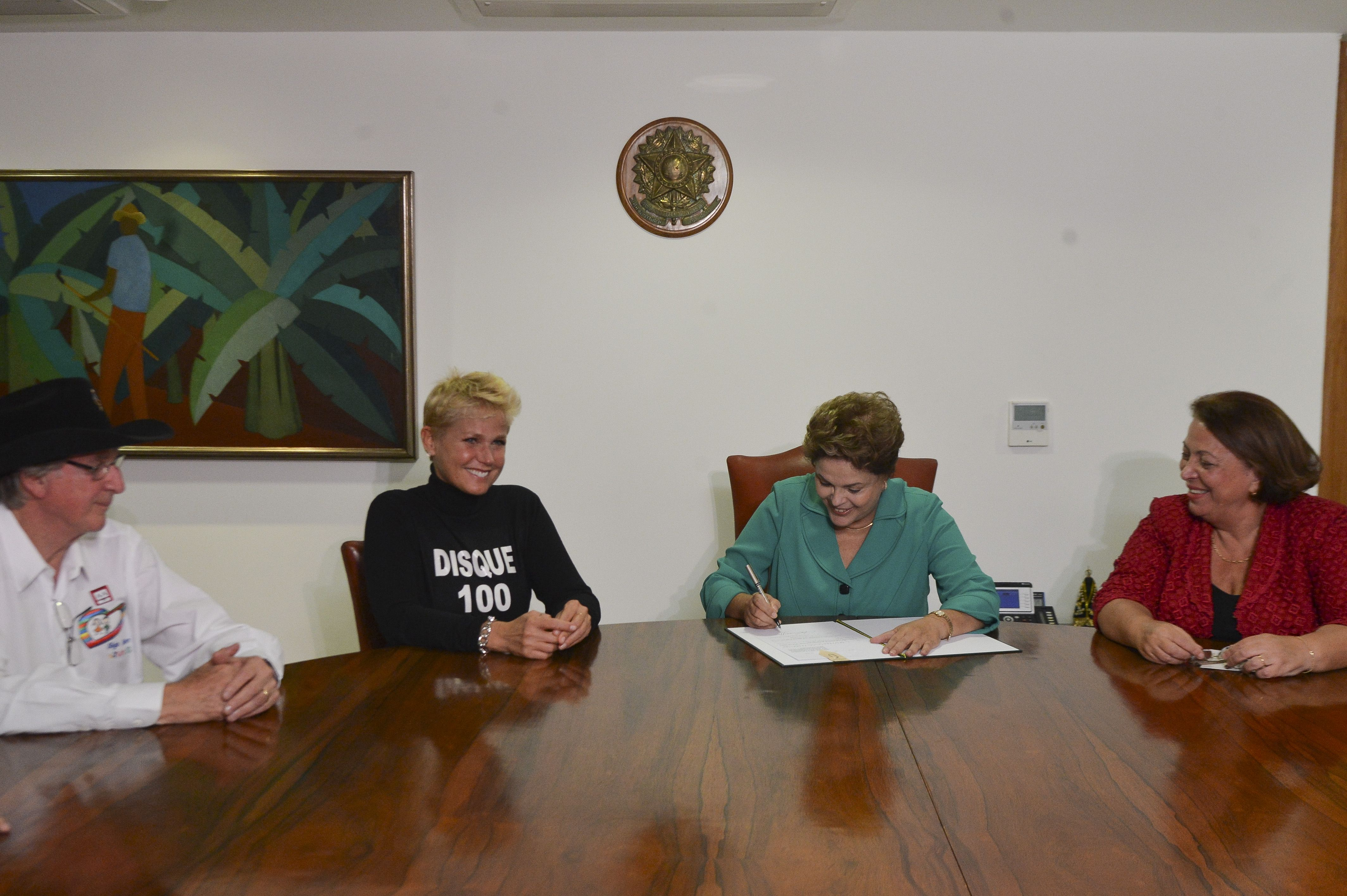
Xuxa with then-President Dilma Rousseff at the Palácio do Planalto in 2014

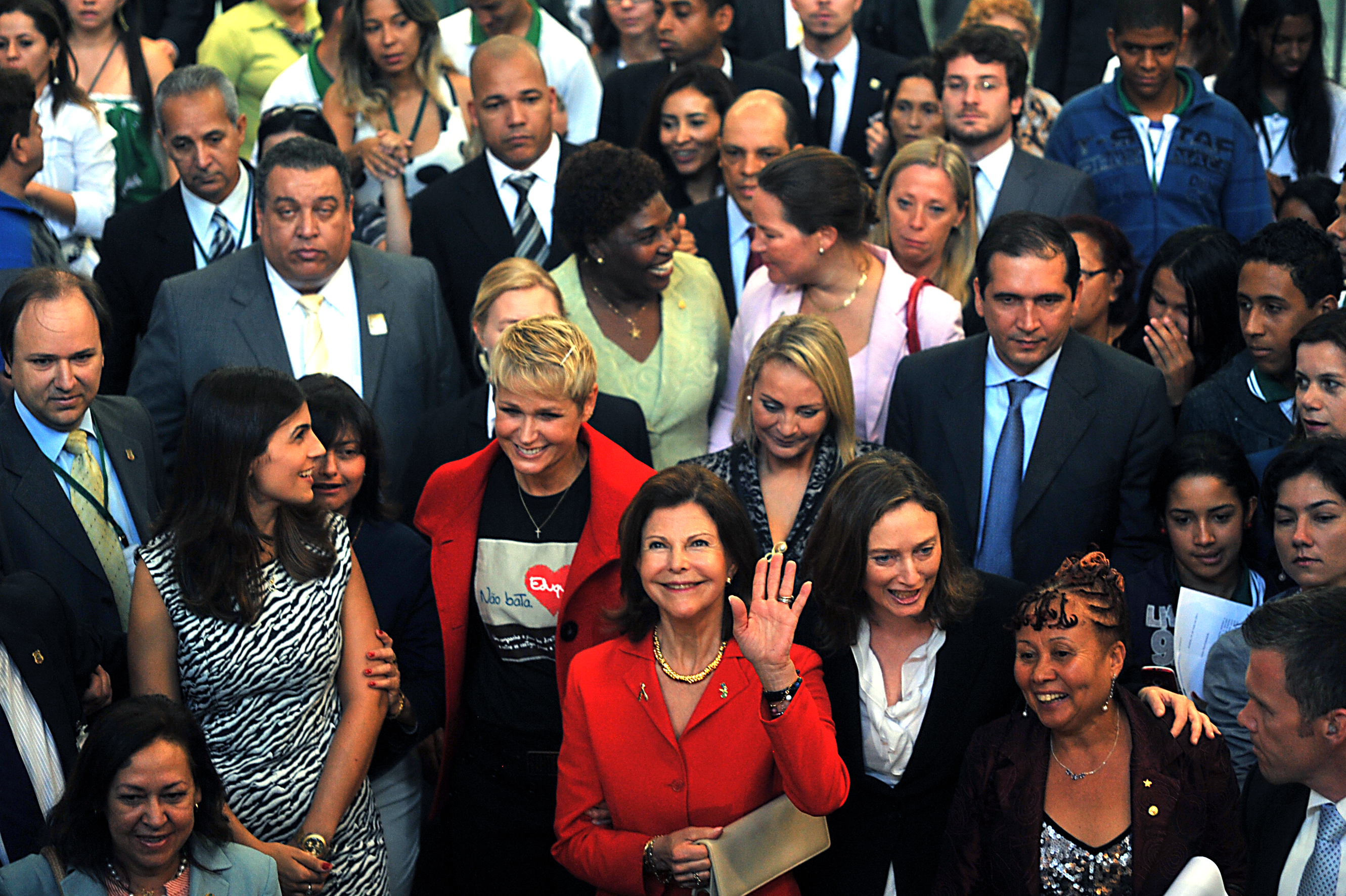
Queen Silvia of Sweden and Xuxa, participate in a seminar about violence against children in Brasília

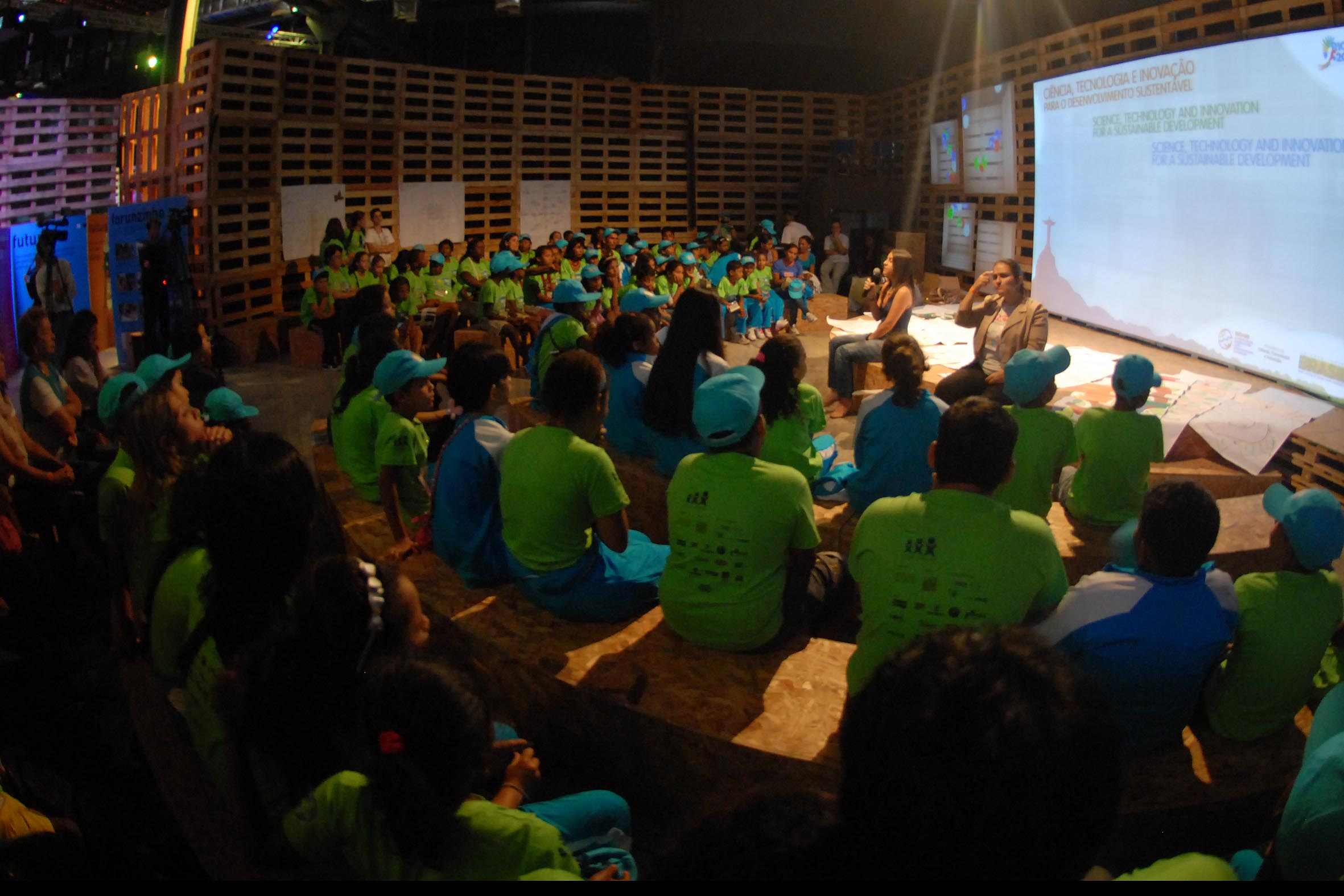
Students of the Xuxa Meneghel Foundation during Rio+20

In September 2011, Colombian singer, Shakira, and Xuxa joined forces through their respective charitable foundations to aid children younger than six years old who live in Brazil's poorest communities. The two artists, together with Brazilian government officials, signed an accord in Rio de Janeiro for a program of cooperation. In its first four years, it plans to provide better access to education to children from 100 schools in Brazil.

Xuxa supports the campaign "Tri-national to Combat Sexual Exploitation of Children and Adolescents" which aims to encourage people to report cases of exploitation and abuse of minors living on the border between Brazil, Paraguay, and Argentina. Since May 2013, the campaign has integrated the actions of several groups: the Itaipu Dam, the International Labour Organization (ILO), the Municipal Tourism Council, Childhood and Youth, Ministry of Labor and Employment, and entities of Paraguay and Argentina who work in the same area.

In May 2014, then-President Dilma Rousseff signed a law that applied stronger penalties to the crime of sexual exploitation of children and adolescents. On 4 June 2014, Xuxa was present when the Senate of Brazil passed the Lei da Palmada (PLC 58/2014) that prohibits the use of violence in the education of children and adolescents, which had been adopted by the Commission on Human Rights of the Chamber of Deputies. When asked about criticism from some parents about how they will educate their children after the passage of this law, Xuxa said that they can educate, but without violence: "We have to show that people can and should educate without violence". Xuxa said that the project should be called "Lei Menino Bernardo" in honor of Bernardo Boldrini, an 11-year-old boy killed in April that year.

== Personal life ==
=== Fortune and investments ===
By 1982, Xuxa was already considered one of the leading advertising figures in the country, advertising everything from underwear to residential buildings. In the same year she landed a supporting role in the soap opera Elas por Elas at TV Globo. Also in 1982 Xuxa founded her first company, Xuxa Produções, a legal entity that takes care of the Xuxa brand and holds, exclusively, the rights to commercialize the use of the brand and image of the artist, both nationally and internationally. The company also represents Xuxa in any and all contracts. Additionally, the company has represented other interests as well, and in 1993 Xuxa Produções was responsible for bringing Michael Jackson's Dangerous World Tour to Brazil. The company was also involved in the co-production of films by Renato Aragão, Angelica and Father Marcelo Rossi.

Following her successful entry to Clube da Criança, the start of her modeling career on weekdays in New York City, and the release of her album Xuxa e Seus Amigos (which sold 500,000 copies in 1983), Xuxa signed a contract with Globo TV and Som Livre. In the same year Xuxa founded the brand O Bicho Comeu, responsible for the commercialization of clothes and accessories for children. After an initial salary at Globo TV of US$40,000, Xuxa saw several salary increases, which in 1987 had already reached one million dollars. Also in 1987 she founded "Beijinho Beijinho Produções", responsible for the co-production of television programs and albums. Until 1988, the companies of Xuxa were run by her parents and brothers Cirano, Bladimir, and Solange. That year, the director of Xuxa's program, Marlene Mattos, and lawyer Luiz Cláudio Moreira took over her companies. The Xuxa film series premiered in theaters the same year with the film Super Xuxa contra Baixo Astral, which was seen by more than 2.8 million viewers. By this point, Xuxa's fortune was over R$50 million. In 1989 Xuxa already shared with Hebe Camargo the title of highest-paid host of Latin America, receiving US$1.5 million monthly from Globo TV alone. In 1989, she bought the three million square meter "MG Meneghel" farm in Rio Bonito, Rio de Janeiro; the farm also had 50 mango trees and 200 dairy cattle. The activities of the Xuxa Meneghel Foundation, which carries out four social development programs (Program for Networks and Political Incidence, Program for Socio-educational Actions, Integrated Assistance Program, and the Institutional Partnerships Program) also began during that time.

In 1990, Xuxa founded the Xuxa International Corporation, based in the Cayman Islands, a well-known tax haven, which was responsible for collecting royalties from Xuxa's international enterprises. Her royalties varied between 5% and 20% of the final profit from the sale of products licensed under her brand. Xuxa made a total profit of $19 million in 1990, resulting in her 37th appearance on Forbes' list of "Top 40 Most Enlightened Celebrities" in 1991, the first Latin American to appear on the list. The magazine reported that her fortune had already surpassed that of Madonna and was equated with that of Arnold Schwarzenegger.

Also in 1990, Xuxa bought a site in Vargem Grande, Rio de Janeiro for US$2 million. The property underwent several renovations so that it could be Xuxa's official residence, with a mini zoo and nursery, heated pool with waterfall, main house (1050 m^{2}, two floors and five suites with closet), guest house (280 m^{2}), Japanese restaurant (195 m^{2} bar, industrial kitchen and laundry), fitness center (196 m^{2}), party room (540 m^{2}), recording studio (60 m^{2}), sauna (com 62 m^{2}), employees' quarters (283 m^{2}), caretaker's quarters (63 m^{2}), support cellar (67 m^{2}), linen and storage (306 m^{2}), garage for eight cars, and a helipad. With a total of 78,000 square meters, Xuxa traveled to the estate by golf cart. This home was a refuge for Xuxa, but that did not prevent fans sleeping in the entrance of the site waiting for her. The estate, called Casa Rosa, was a frequent sight in television programs and magazines, consequently becoming well known in Brazilian pop culture, and coming to be known as the Brazilian "Neverland". In 2007, with the concern of providing a more normal social life for her daughter Sasha, Xuxa put the site up for sale for $8 million, and sold it in 2010. However, as of 2024 it remains abandoned. In 1990, Xuxa acquired an apartment of five million dollars in New York City, a property she still owns. She also took advantage of the opening of the Brazilian market to imported vehicles to found Shine Car, a concessionaire of imported luxury cars based in Rio de Janeiro. Through a partnership with Grendene, Xuxa sold 4 million sandals in Brazil, 1 million in the United States, 1 million in Mexico and 500,000 in the rest of Latin America in 1990 alone.

Between 1991 and 1992, Xuxa received $1 million a month for work on the Telefe for El Show de Xuxa. She launched the Xuxa Meneghel Models Course in Rio de Janeiro, with a duration of seven months and a load of six hours a week, and a tuition starting at $60. Also in 1991 Xuxa ramped up the licensing of products featuring her brand name. She bought five luxury apartments in São Paulo and Rio de Janeiro, which earned her $200,000 in rent income. In 1992. Xuxa signed a contract with the Spanish television network Telecinco for 15 episodes of the Xuxa Park program, receiving $240,000 per episode. Only TV Globo, Telefe and Telecinco Xuxa received more than $3.4 million monthly. In May 1992, Xuxa's estate was estimated at US$100 million by People, making her the second-richest artist in Brazil until then, with the same patrimony of Roberto Carlos and behind Silvio Santos. In the same year she founded the Light Beam Corporation to license her brand exclusively in the United States, selling this year, among other products, 500,000 dolls of her own likeness. Xuxa made 12 advertising campaigns that year, earning $200,000 each. Xuxa made a final profit of $27 million in 1992, resulting in her return to the list of "40 celebrities who grew richer in the last year" by Forbes in 1993, this time in 28th place. Between 1986 and 1992 Xuxa had sold 18 million CDs, which had generated a revenue of over $175 million, of which 20% she kept. Xuxa's Xuxa program produced four tours, including Xuxa's Xuxa 89 tour, in which Xuxa's cache was over $300,000, with a production roster of ten trucks, 60 flights, two wagons, and two 25-ton stages with more than 150 people involved.

In 1993, she premiered the Xuxa program in the United States, in English. The program was broadcast by more than 100 stations in the country, including CBS and Freeform, and was also sold to more than 120 countries. Through the program, Xuxa received $7 million and launched products in more than 100 countries. So that she could rest between the recordings of the show, Xuxa bought a mansion in Calabasas, Califórnia. In September 1999 the residence was bought by the singer and American actress Brandy Norwood, for $1.7 million. In the year of 1993 Xuxa handled $220 million only in licenses. At the end of this year, a problem in her spine caused her work to slow down. In 1994, the death of Ayrton Senna also contributed to Xuxa gradually diminishing her work rate. Later that year, she bought a mansion on Star Island in Miami for $15 million. The mansion had previously belonged to Madonna and is still owned by Xuxa today. A tourist boat ride titled The Rich and Famous Tour, includes the Xuxa mansion in the script. In present-day money, a mansion on the island has the minimum price of $65 million.

On her 33rd birthday, she received a Ferrari F355 from her manager Marlene Matos. In 1996 they realized the tour Tô de Bem com a Vida, with more than 45 concerts and a cache of $350,000. In that same year the international press announced that Xuxa was concerned about having no private life. In October, she announced that she would soon leave her career to try to be a mother through artificial insemination, but that did not happen because Xuxa had to keep working in order to meet contractual deadlines. In November her fortune was estimated at $300 million. In 1996 she founded Lar's Empreendimentos, an entity responsible for real estate investments and the creation of the O Mundo da Xuxa park in 2003. In 2000, she acquired a million-dollar home in Celebration, Florida, near Walt Disney World. In 2005, an 11-year-old girl, the daughter of a friend of Xuxa, died at Disneyland while she was lodging in Xuxa's house.

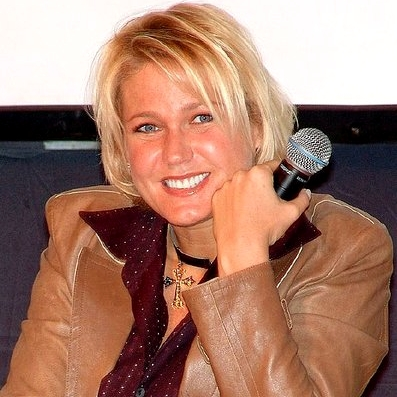
Xuxa in 2004

In 2002, Xuxa acquired four suites for R$13 million in São Conrado, in Rio de Janeiro. In 2008 part of the property caught fire while Xuxa, Sasha and Luciano Szafir were inside. Luciano was hospitalized after inhaling smoke. According to the magazine Veja, also in 2002, Xuxa had $250 million in equity referring only to real estate. The year 2002 was also marked by the professional breakup of Xuxa and Marlene Mattos, who left the command of Xuxa's holding company by reducing her salary at Globo TV to $1 million a month, which lasted until her exit. Xuxa founded the company Espaço Laser, of which she holds a 51% share . The year ended with 200 licensed products and monthly sales of R$30 million.

In 2003, she bought the Gugu Park at the SP Market mall in São Paulo and transformed it into the Xuxa Mundo O Mundo amusement park. She bought the park for $15 million. The park made about R$10 million a year. In 2007, when she left to live in Casa Rosa, Xuxa moved to a residence that had been built in the Malibu Condominium in Barra da Tijuca. The 1,700-square-meter, three-storey mansion is valued at R$10 million. In 2009, Lar's Empreendimentos was ordered to pay an indemnity of R$50,000 for moral and material damages in legal proceedings.

In November 2010 Xuxa did not agree to an increase in rent of the building which the Shine Car company occupied and took the landlord to court, but lost the action, ultimately vacating the property. Shine Car became defunct in January 2011. Also in January 2011 Xuxa won a $150,000 lawsuit against Folha Universal, which had stated in 2008 that the artist "was Satanist and would have sold her soul to the devil for $100 million." In 2012 Xuxa received R$2 million to participate in an advertising campaign of beauty products by the brand Wella, changing the color of her hair, becoming a brunette for the first time in her career. The $2 million was donated to the Xuxa Meneghel Foundation. In 2013 TV Bandeirantes was ordered by the Superior Court of Justice (STJ) to pay an indemnity of 1.1 million reais to Xuxa. The STJ ruled that Xuxa appeared naked on the station's show in 2008. The images had been published by Playboy before Xuxa launched herself as a children's show host in the early 1980s. The STJ, therefore, rejected the request of the issuer to rediscuss the amount of compensation established by the Court of Justice of Rio de Janeiro (TJRJ) in 2011. Also in 2013 Xuxa bought an island in Angra dos Reis, for R$12.7 million.

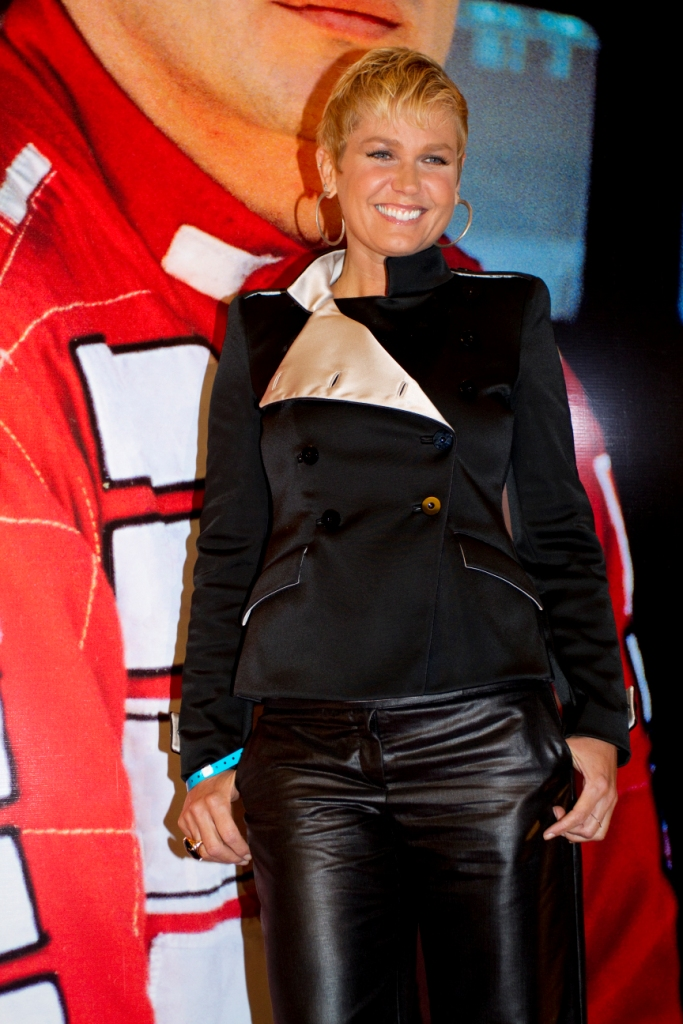
Xuxa at the premiere of the movie Senna in 2010

In 2014 RecordTV was ordered to pay R$100,000 to Xuxa. The broadcaster was sued for broadcasting photos of her from a photoessay that appeared in Playboy in the 1980s without authorization during the Gugu Liberato in 2012. In February 2015, Xuxa refused a proposed renewal with Globo, since without any new projects, her salary would be reduced to R$250,000 compared to the $1 million she used to get. In the same month, O Mundo da Xuxa came to an end, since the attraction would have to go through new expansions in order to fill the space it was in. This was not viable due to the Brazilian economic crisis; the park had a final profit of R$4 million in 2014, against R$10 million in 2008. It was sold to Parque da Mônica for R$40 million. In March Xuxa signed with RecordTV for R$1 million monthly. If her program leaves the network, Xuxa will still receive $250,000 monthly. In that same year the Laser Space earned R$50 million. Xuxa, as a businesswoman, had a final profit of $160 million from her companies.

In 2016, Espaço Laser earned R$60 million, expanding its operations to 187 units in Brazil. Xuxa, as a businesswoman, made a final profit of R$200 million with her holding company in 2016. In the same year, she launched herself as a YouTuber. Xuxa's children's party company, Casa X, earned R$17 million in 2017, a 50% increase in one year. The equity of Xuxa and her companies is valued at US$1 billion, making her one of the richest women in Brazil. Xuxa is a vegan.

=== Relationships and children ===
Xuxa has one daughter with actor Luciano Szafir, Sasha, who was born in 1998. Xuxa dated Brazilian footballer Pelé in the 1980s, and Formula One driver Ayrton Senna in the late 1980s and early 1990s. In 2012, Xuxa claimed that American singer Michael Jackson had once courted her, inviting her to dinner at Neverland Ranch. Additionally, Jackson's manager asked whether she would consider bearing his children. As of 2013, she is in a relationship with actor and singer Junno Andrade. In 2013, she acquired Italian citizenship.

== Filmography ==
=== Television ===
- Clube da Criança (1983)
- Xou da Xuxa (1986)
- Bobeou Dançou (1989)
- El Show de Xuxa (1991)
- Paradão da Xuxa (1992)
- Xuxa Park (1992)
- Xuxa (1993)
- Xuxa (1993)
- Xuxa Park (1994)
- Xuxa Hits (1995)
- Planeta Xuxa (1997)
- Xuxa no Mundo da Imaginação (2002)
- TV Xuxa (2005)
- Xuxa Meneghel (2015)
- Dancing Brasil (2017)
- The Four Brasil (2019)

=== Films ===
- Love Strange Love (1982)
- Fuscão Preto (1983)
- O Trapalhão na Arca de Noé (1983)
- Os Trapalhões e o Mágico de Oróz (1984)
- Os Trapalhões no Reino da Fantasia (1985)
- Super Xuxa contra Baixo Astral (1988)
- A Princesa Xuxa e os Trapalhões (1989)
- Lua de Cristal (1990)
- O Mistério de Robin Hood (1990)
- Gaúcho Negro (1991)
- Xuxa Requebra (1999)
- Xuxa Popstar (2000)
- Xuxa e os Duendes (2001)
- Xuxa e os Duendes 2: No Caminho das Fadas (2002)
- Xuxa Abracadabra (2003)
- Xuxa e o Tesouro da Cidade Perdida (2004)
- Xuxinha e Guto contra os Monstros do Espaço (2005)
- Xuxa Gêmeas (2006)
- Xuxa em Sonho de Menina (2007)
- Xuxa em O Mistério de Feiurinha (2009)

== Discography ==
- Xuxa e Seus Amigos (1985)
- Xou da Xuxa (1986)
- Xegundo Xou da Xuxa (1987)
- Xou da Xuxa 3 (1988)
- 4º Xou da Xuxa (1989)
- Xuxa (1989)
- Xuxa 5 (1990)
- Xou da Xuxa Seis (1991)
- Xuxa (1991)
- Xou da Xuxa Sete (1992)
- Xuxa (1992)
- Xuxa (1993)
- Sexto Sentido (1994)
- El Pequeño Mundo (1994)
- Luz no Meu Caminho (1995)
- Tô de Bem com a Vida (1996)
- Xuxa Dance (1996)
- Boas Notícias (1997)
- Só Faltava Você (1998)
- El Mundo Es de los Dos (1999)
- Xuxa 2000 (1999)
- Só Para Baixinhos (2000)
- Só Para Baixinhos 2 (2001)
- Só Para Baixinhos 3 (2002)
- Só Para Baixinhos 4 (2003)
- Circo (2004)
- Solamente para Bajitos (2005)
- Festa (2005)
- Só Para Baixinhos 7 (2007)
- Só Para Baixinhos 8 (2008)
- Natal Mágico (2009)
- Baixinhos, Bichinhos e + (2010)
- Sustentabilidade (2011)
- É Pra Dançar (2013)
- ABC do XSPB (2016)
- Raridades X (2024)
- Raridades de Natal (2024)
- Cores (2025)

== See also ==
- List of best-selling Latin music artists
