= TV Xuxa =

- Genre: Children; Game show Music; Talk show
- Directed by: Boninho; Mário Meirelles
- Opening theme: "TV Xuxa no Ar"
- Country of origin: Brazil
- Original language: Portuguese
- No. of seasons: 9
- No. of episodes: 1.000

Production
- Running time: 95 minutes

Original release
- Network: Rede Globo
- Release: 4 April 2005 – 25 January 2014

Related
- Xuxa no Mundo da Imaginação (2002-2004); Xuxa Meneghel (2015-2016)

TV Xuxa is a children's program on display day-by-day from 2005 until 2007, in the same format as TV Colosso on Rede Globo. Xuxa then hosted a game show which lasted from 2008 to 2014, in the same format as Planeta Xuxa, another game show that was shown in the 1990s.

== Children's program (2005–2007) ==
The first season of the show had a stage in a format almost similar to the Australian children's TV series Hi-5.

"TV Xuxa" presented the segment "Notícia da Hora", the news program hosted by Edna Tureza, Artur Ismo and Felipe Mingau; "Triângulo em Ação", featuring the Txutxucão Gang's characters, the dogs:Felícia Fênix, Dinha, Max Well, Otar, Dongo, and Dona Vânia Catxorra, all walk-around puppets built by Grupo 100 Modos with facial animations controlled by remote control (as Priscilla from TV Colosso); and "Kéka Tóke Xou", a talk-show parody hosted by Bruxa Kéka and Urubu João, in TV Pirata (1988 - 1990 and 1992), Mais Você and Programa do Jô cross-over formats.

The second stage was in a spaceships, as reminds of her career trademark. In the same year, Xuxa completed 20 years on TV Globo and had a special program.

The third and last of the children's program, the stage is now on top of tables.

== Sessão X ==
"Sessão X" was a TV Xuxa section, which airs some cartoons. Some of them are The Fairly OddParents, SpongeBob SquarePants, Stickin' Around, Potatoes and Dragons, Avatar: The Last Airbender, Power Rangers, He-Man and the Masters of the Universe (2002), Sonic X and Dungeons & Dragons.

== Game show (2008–2014) ==
TV Xuxa was reformulated to change public and debuting new format, hourly and attractions. When it became game show came to be viewed weekly on Saturdays with the intention of rejuvenating the public. The program stopped showing cartoons, invested in play, and Xuxa began to receive her guests on a stage designed to interviews and musical numbers. At this stage, Xuxa talked with singers Justin Bieber (outside the studio, when he came to show in Brazil), and Taylor Swift, who put everyone to dance to the sound of live hits "We Are Never Ever Getting Back Together" and "Long Live" (song that was a duet with Brazilian singer Paula Fernandes).
