= Xuxa Meneghel (talk show) =

Brazilian late-night talk show

- Genre: Talk show
- Developed by: Ignácio Coqueiro (2016); Mariozinho Vaz (2015-2016)
- Presented by: Xuxa Meneghel
- Country of origin: Brazil
- Original language: Portuguese
- No. of seasons: 2
- No. of episodes: 67

Production
- Production location: RecNov (Record's studio)
- Running time: 105 minutes
- Production companies: Xuxa Produções; Casablanca; Cygnus Media; Central Record de Produção

Original release
- Network: Rede Record
- Release: 17 August 2015 – 19 December 2016

Related
- TV Xuxa (2005–2014); Dancing Brasil (2017–2019); The Ellen DeGeneres Show

Xuxa Meneghel is a Brazilian late-night talk show hosted by Xuxa and produced by Rede Record. It was broadcast on Monday nights between 17 August 2015 and 19 December 2016. Originally the program would gain a new season in 2017, however the broadcaster and presenter decided to finalize it to be able to focus on the new project, Dancing Brasil.

== Background ==
Considered to be the longest hiring in the history of Brazilian television, after 29 years on Rede Globo, and away from television a year ago, the presenter Xuxa Meneghel, debuted her new program on 17 August 2015, prime time, live, soon after Jornal da Record, under the direction of Mariozinho Vaz.

First broadcast live on Monday nights, direct from the RecNov complex in Rio de Janeiro, the program Xuxa Meneghel, inspired by The Ellen DeGeneres Show, a talk show airing on NBC in the United States - mixes entertainment, fun, excitement, humor, musical attractions, interviews, games and reports.

On stage, Xuxa received, with each show, one or two guests. In 2015, the program hosted the Concurso A Nova Prometida, which chose an actress for the Biblical soap opera, A Terra Prometida. Actress Louise Marrie was the winner of the contest.

In January 2016, it was reported that RecordTV hired a director to edit everything that is "cool, vulgar and immoral" in relation to the church. This edition came to be seen by the press as a form of "censorship" and that the transmitter would be dissatisfied with excess of sexual references and the performance of the program in the advertising market.

After a pause, it was broadcast again on 11 January 2016, this time, with general direction of Ignacio Coqueiro. On 14 September, the show was presented by Rodrigo Faro, Marcos Mion and Ticiane Pinheiro, because Xuxa was not able to present the attraction, due to the death of his brother Cirano Rojabaglia.

On 23 November, the program was produced by the producer Cygnus Media, Patrick Siaretta and Carla Affonso. In January 2016 the program happened to be produced by the Casablanca producer. In the same month, the director Mariozinho Vaz leaves the direction of the program. From then, Xuxa Meneghel happened to have the general direction of Ignacio Coqueiro and direction of Blad Meneghel, Patrícia Guimarães and Thamara Cumplido.

== Release ==
In November 2015, it was published in the Diário Oficial da União that through the Brazilian advisory rating system, the classification would be changed from "Free" to "not recommended for children under 12 years". The Ministry of Justice said that the program has "inappropriate language" for this age group. RecordTV already suggested this classification, using the seal "12" years with the Ministry of Justice indicating that it should be "Free". Daniel Castro of the Notícias da TV website stated that it is "a fact that his show, a talk show, is aimed at an adult audience, the ex-little ones." In the appeal, she discusses topics such as sexual harassment, fame and religion. some expression of sexual connotation."

== Concept ==
On stage, Xuxa receives, with each show, one or two special guests. In addition, she conducts external interviews. Among the personalities already interviewed are Neymar, surfer Gabriel Medina and actor Jack Black.

In 2015, the program hosted the Concurso A Nova Prometida, which chose an actress for the Biblical telenovela, A Terra Prometida. Actress Louise Marrie was the winner of the contest.

On November 16, 2015, the program was produced by Cygnus Media. In January 2016 the Casablanca production company took over the talk show production. In the same month, the director Mariozinho Vaz leaves the direction of the program. From then, Xuxa Meneghel happened to have the general direction of Ignacio Coqueiro and direction of Blad Meneghel (Xuxa's brother), Patrícia Guimarães and Fulfilled Thamara.

== Reception ==
Patrícia Kogut from O Globo's website said Xuxa's debut on Record was "no big news." Mauricio Stycer on review for Blog Os Fera.uol said that "Xuxa debuts with no subject, but with good Twitter jokes and (...) it is possible to say that, with the exception of sound, sleepy, and frameless faults, acceptable to the living, no great mistake occurred. The problems that drew attention at the premiere were of another order: lack of ideas and poverty of subjects." Journalist Luciana Liviero praised the making of the edition but criticized the clothing, audio quality and fans of Xuxa in the audience.

Flávio Ricco criticized the program in his review for TV E Famosos saying: "There's no point in wanting to cheat: Xuxa still does not have a show on Record ... People close to Xuxa and their most passionate fans have complained about Record, with complaints that range from working conditions offered to the lack of a larger number of calls. What is missing, really is a good program. (...) Since coming to Record, coming out of a situation not so comfortable of Globo, Xuxa was given complete freedom to do what he pleased ... There have been several embezzlements in his team and what has been shown so far is far from being something that attracts the attention of the public." The TV critic José Armando Vanucci said that "Xuxa is a communicator, she beats the 'hostess', but there is still no chemistry of her with Record. Her audience is not on record, unfortunately."

== Ratings ==
Xuxa Meneghel debuted with a 10.4 point rating; and 19% of share. It usually only trails behind Programa do Ratinho, and Maquina da Fama in total viewers.
