= Luciano Szafir =

Brazilian model and actor (born 1968)

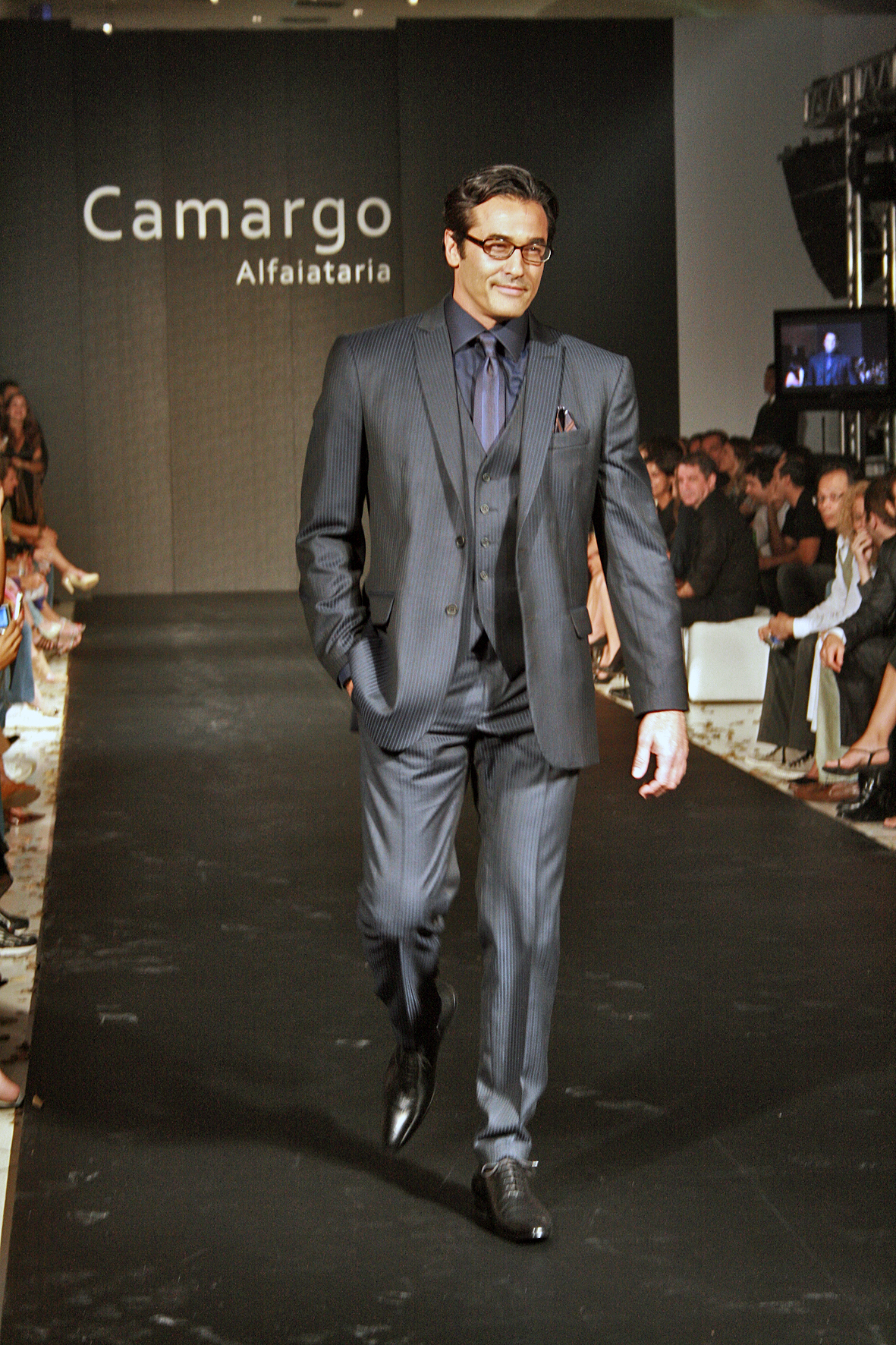
- Szafir in 2009
- Born: Luciano Lebelson Szafir; 31 December 1968 (age 57); São Paulo, Brazil
- Occupations: Businessman; actor
- Years active: 1986–present
- Partner(s): Xuxa (1997–2002); Luhanna Melloni (2012–present)
- Children: 3, including Sasha
- Modeling information
- Height: 1.90 m (6 ft 3 in)
- Hair color: Brown
- Eye color: Brown

Luciano Lebelson Szafir (born 31 December 1968) is a Brazilian businessman, actor, and former model.

== Early life ==
Szafir is the son of Gabriel and Betty Szafir. He has a twin sister named Priscila, an older sister named Alexandra and a younger brother named Salomão. He is also uncle to his twin sister's two children, Júlia and Luís Otávio. Szafir is of Ashkenazi Jewish descent.

== Career ==
Earlier in his career, Szafir worked as a model. He is the sole actor for Rede Record, and has acted in three novel adaptations for radio.

He was the highlight of the Alliance samba school of Joaçaba-SC in the year 2006, in the pilot called "Taste like a hug."

== Personal life ==
He has a daughter, Sasha Meneghel, with the TV host Xuxa Meneghel, with whom he was in a relationship for 11 years.

He practices martial arts and currently holds a black belt in Brazilian Jiu-Jitsu, a martial art he has practiced since 1978.

== Filmography ==
=== Television ===
- 2015 - Os Dez Mandamentos
- 2011 - Rebelde.... Franco Albuquerque
- 2009 - Mutantes - Promises of Love.... Amadeus Lamb
- 2007 - Love and intrigue.... Felipe Junqueira de Albuquerque
- 2006 - Vidas Opostas.... Leonardo Rocha
- 2004 - Metamorphoses.... Dr. Lucas
- 2001 - O Clone.... Zein
- 2001 - Um Anjo Caiu do Céu.... Eduardo
- 2000 - Watercolor of Brazil.... Alfredo
- 2000 - Uga-Uga.... Pepê
- 1998 - Você Decide.... Presenter
- 1998 - Labyrinth.... Ivan Sampaio
- 1997 - Anjo Mau.... Júlio Malagoni

=== Film ===
- 2017 - Goitaca.... Maracajaguacu
- 2012 - Brave .... Lord MacGuffin (voice)
- 2012 - Réquiem para Laura Martin
- 2009 - Xuxa in The Mystery of Little Ugliness.... Cinderella's Prince
- 2007 - Acerto de Contas
- 2007 - Opera Mallandro.... Father of Chico
- 2006 - Nightmare Man.... William
- 2006 - Women of Brazil.... Murilo
- 2006 - Our Lady of Caravaggio.... Comes
- 2002 - Xuxa e os Duendes 2 - No Caminho das Fadas
- 1998 - Simon and the Slapstick Phantom
