= Xuxa só para Baixinhos 6 – Festa =

Xuxa Só para Baixinhos Vol. 6 – Festa

Studio album by Xuxa
- Released: September 12, 2005
- Recorded: 2005
- Length: 62:12
- Label: Som Livre
- Producers: Mônica Muniz; Luiz Claudio Moreira

Xuxa chronology
Solamente para Bajitos (2005)	Xuxa Só para Baixinhos Vol. 6 – Festa (2005)	Xuxa: O Show Ao Vivo (2006)

Singles from Xuxa só Para Baixinhos 6
- 1. "Bombando Brinque" Released: 2005; 2. "Dança da Xuxa (Remix DJ Marlboro)" Released: 2006; 3. "Festa" Released: 2006

Xuxa só Para Baixinhos 6 or Festa (also known as XSPB 6) (transl. Only For Children Six- Party) is the twenty-ninth studio album by Brazilian recording artist Xuxa, released on September 12, 2005, by Som Livre as the sixth album in the collection Só Para Baixinhos.

The album has re-recordings of the singer's greatest hits since Xou da Xuxa (1986), contains the participation of singer Ivete Sangalo in re-recording her song "Festa". The song "Parabéns da Xuxa" was released only on the CD, "Tá bom" is included on the CD as a full track (on the DVD, there are only excerpts from it, in the passages between songs.

== Release and reception ==
Xuxa só Para Baixinhos 6 - Festa was released on December 9, 2005 on CD and VHS, together or separately and also on Blu-ray; and was the last album in the collection Só Para Baixinhos to be released in VHS format. It sold more than 100,000 copies in DVD, yielding certification of diamond. This album reached 7th place among the best-selling CDs of the year, and 3rd place among the DVDs.

The Spanish version of Xuxa Festa, the Xuxa Fiesta, has never been released and is scheduled to be released in 2018, Xuxa sang the Spanish versions of "Ilariê" (Ilarié), "Doce Mel" (Dulce Miel), in the Susana Giménez program in 2011; and "Tindolelê" (Chindolele) in the party of 25 years of the Argentine transmitter Telefé in 2015.

== Awards ==
Xuxa Festa was nominated to the Best Latin Children's Album in the 7th Annual Latin Grammy Awards in 2007.

== Tour ==
Xuxa Festa was the fourteenth tour of the presenter and singer Xuxa Meneghel, the tour is based on the album Só Para Baixinhos 6: Xuxa Festa. The tour began on October 21, 2006 at the Rio de Janeiro launch show. The tour toured the cities of Brasília, São Paulo and Luanda, Angola (being the only XSPB tour to have an international show, this show was broadcast live). It was released in 2008 the official record of the tour, being the third tour of Xuxa to have a record.

== Track listing ==
Xuxa só para Baixinhos 6 – CD edition
No.	Title	Writer(s)	Length
1.	"Bombando Brinque"	Carlinhos Brown	3:12
2.	"Ilariê"	Cid Guerreiro; Dito; Ceinha	2:26
3.	"Pinel Por Você"	Cid Guerreiro; Baê; Dito	3:03
4.	"Dança da Xuxa" (DJ Marlboro Remix)	Prentice; Ronaldo Monteiro de Souza	4:03
5.	"Libera Geral"	Álvaro Socci; Cláudio Matta	3:36
6.	"Tô de Bem Com a Vida" ( Álvaro Socci; Cláudio Matta; Vivian Perl)	M Cook; J Fatt; A Field; G Page; Versão: Vanessa Alves	3:06
7.	"Doce Mel" (Bom Estar com Você)	Cláudio Rabello; Renato Corrêa	3:25
8.	"Festa" (featuring Ivete Sangalo)	Anderson Cunha	3:29
9.	"Tindolelê"	Cid Guerreiro; Dito	3:05
10.	"Hoje é Dia de Folia" (Nando Cordel)	D.P.; Arranjo e Adaptação: Vanessa Alves	3:06
11.	"Brincar de Índio"	Michael Sullivan; Paulo Massadas	2:58
12.	"Xuxalelê"	Zé Henrique; Fred Pereira	2:53
13.	"A Vida é Uma Festa"	Michael Sullivan; Paulo Massadas	3:05
14.	"Tá Bom"	Vanessa Alves; Ary Sperling; Mauricio Gaetanil	3:15
15.	"Lua de Cristal"	Michael Sullivan; Paulo Massadas	3:28
16.	"Abecedário da Xuxa"	Ronaldo Monteiro; César Costa Filho	3:17
17.	"Arco-Íris"	Michael Sullivan; Paulo Massadas; Ana Penido	4:06
18.	"Parabéns da Xuxa"	M Cook; J Fatt; A Field; G Page; D Lindsay; Christine Anu	2:21
Total length:			59:40

Xuxa só para Baixinhos 6 – DVD and VHS editing
No.	Title	Writer(s)	Length
1.	"Bombando Brinque"	Carlinhos Brown	3:13
2.	"Introdução"		0:10
3.	"Ilariê"	Cid Guerreiro; Dito; Ceinha	2:26
4.	"Tá Bom (Musical Passage with the theme: Hip-Hop)"		0:17
5.	"Dança da Xuxa" (DJ Marlboro Remix)	Prentice; Ronaldo Monteiro de Souza	4:03
6.	"Tá Bom (Musical Passage with the theme: Forró)"		0:18
7.	"Doce Mel" (Bom Estar com Você)	Cláudio Rabello; Renato Corrêa	3:25
8.	"Tá Bom (Musical Passage with the theme: Tango)"		0:16
9.	"Xuxalelê"	Zé Henrique; Fred Pereira	2:50
10.	"Tá Bom (Musical Passage with the theme: Rock)"		0:17
11.	"Abecedário da Xuxa"	Ronaldo Monteiro; César Costa Filho	3:17
12.	"Tá Bom (Musical Passage with the theme: Jazz)"		0:18
13.	"Tindolelê"	Cid Guerreiro; Dito	3:05
14.	"Tá Bom (Musical Passage with the theme: Funk Melody)"		0:17
15.	"Pinel Por Você"	Cid Guerreiro; Baê; Dito	3:03
16.	"Tá Bom (Musical Passage with the theme: Capoeira)"		0:17
17.	"Festa" (featuring Ivete Sangalo)	Anderson Cunha	3:29
18.	"Tá Bom (Musical Passage with the theme: Anos 60)"		0:17
19.	"Tô de Bem Com a Vida"	M Cook; J Fatt; A Field; G Page; Versão: Vanessa Alves	3:06
20.	"Tá Bom (Musical Passage with the theme: Samba)"		0:17
21.	"A Vida é Uma Festa"	Michael Sullivan; Paulo Massadas	3:07
22.	"Tá Bom (Musical Passage with the theme: Cadeirante)"		0:17
23.	"Libera Geral"	Álvaro Socci; Cláudio Matta	3:11
24.	"Tá Bom (Musical Passage with the theme: Dança Indígena)"		0:17
25.	"Brincar de Índio"	Michael Sullivan; Paulo Massadas	2:58
26.	"Tá Bom (Musical Passage with the theme: Samba Carioca)"		0:17
27.	"Hoje é Dia de Folia"	D.P. - Arrangement and Adaptation: Vanessa Alves	3:06
28.	"Tá Bom (Musical Passage with the theme: Valsa)"		0:17
29.	"Lua de Cristal" (featuring Sasha Meneghel Szafir)	Michael Sullivan; Paulo Massadas	3:28
30.	"Tá Bom (Musical Passage with the theme: Balé)"		0:17
31.	"Arco-Íris" (featuring Sasha Meneghel Szafir)	Michael Sullivan; Paulo Massadas; Ana Penido	4:06
32.	"Credits" (Arco-Íris (Version Credits))		5:25
Total length:			62:12

== Personnel ==
- General direction: Xuxa Meneghel
- Production: Luiz Claudio Moreira e Mônica Muniz
- Art Direction: Gringo Cardia
- Animation Direction: Marcos Magalhães
- Assistant director: Ana Paula Guimarães (Catu)
- Production Director: Junior Porto
- Musical Direction: Ary Sperling
- Musical Coordination: Vanessa Alves
- CD Mastering: Evren Göknar
- DVD Direction: Brent Hieatt
- Graphic project: Felipe Gois

== Certifications ==
Region	Certification	Certified units/sales
Brazil (Pro-Música Brasil) DVD	Diamond	100,000^{*}
Brazil (Pro-Música Brasil)	Gold	50,000^{‡}
^{*} Sales figures based on certification alone.^{‡} Sales+streaming figures based on certification alone.
