= Xuxa só para Baixinhos =

Audiovisual series

- Produced by: Xuxa Meneghel; Luiz Cláudio Moreira; Mônica Muniz
- Production companies: Xuxa Produções; Som Livre; Sony Music; Sony BMG Music Entertainment
- Country: Brazil
- Languages: Portuguese; Spanish

Xuxa só para Baixinhos (English: Xuxa Only for Little Ones), often abbreviated to XSPB, is an audiovisual series on CDs, DVDs, VHS and Blu-ray released by singer Brazilian television presenter Xuxa Meneghel. Currently, the series has thirteen volumes, with nine released by Som Livre and four, released by Sony Music.

Initially released on VHS and CD, the series began to be edited and re-released on DVD and later on Blu-ray with HD image. The ABPD awarded several volumes of Xuxa só para Baixinhos from the first album to volume 11, highlighting XSPB 1 with Diamond Disc for over 1,000,000 copies sold in Brazil.

Aimed at children, the audiovisual series contains music videos with subtitled songs, aimed at entertainment and educational development of children from 0 to 5 years.

Since the first issue released in 2000, the series has sold more than 8 million copies, and was nominated six times for the Latin Grammy Award for Best Latin Children's Album, winning twice in 2001 with Xuxa só para Baixinhos 2 and in 2002 with the album Xuxa só para Baixinhos 3.

In 2009, the versions on DVD were released in a commemorative box containing eight albums. In 2011, the XSPB 11 - Sustentabilidade became the first DVD with 3D technology, costing more than $1 million to Sony Music, becoming the most expensive album of the record label.

== 2000: XSPB 1 ==
Xuxa só Para Baixinhos (also known as XSPB 1) is the twenty-third studio album and the seventeenth in Portuguese by Brazilian pop singer and Xuxa, is the first album of the "Só Para Baixinhos" collection.

== 2001: XSPB 2 ==
Xuxa só Para Baixinhos 2 (also known as XSPB 2) is the twenty-fourth studio album and the seventeenth in Portuguese by Brazilian singer and actress Xuxa, and of the second album in the "Só Para Baixinhos" collection.

== 2002: XSPB 3 - Country ==
Xuxa só Para Baixinhos 3 - Country (also known as XSPB 3) is the twenty-fifth studio album and the eighteenth in Portuguese by Brazilian pop singer Xuxa, and the third album in the Só Para Baixinhos collection.

== 2003: XSPB 4 - Praia ==
Xuxa só para Baixinhos 4 - Praia (also known as XSPB 4) is the twenty-sixth studio album and the nineteenth in Portuguese by Brazilian singer and TV host Xuxa, is the fourth album in the "Só Para Baixinhos" collection. It was released on July 25, 2003, in the "CD + VHS" and released on DVD on November 26, 2003, was remastered and released on CD in 2008 in an economic version. XSPB 4 was a commercial success, and sold over 750,000 copies on DVD, besides a nomination to the Latin Grammy Award for Best Latin Children's Album.

== 2004: XSPB 5 - Circo ==
Xuxa só para Baixinhos 5 or Xuxa Circo (also known as XSPB 5) is the twenty-seventh studio album and the twentieth in Portuguese by Brazilian singer and TV host Xuxa, is the fifth album in the "Só Para Baixinhos" collection, was released on September 26, 2004. VHS "and released on DVD in November 2004, was remastered and released on CD in 2008 in an economic version. The album sold more than 1,000,000 copies on DVD, yielding diamond disc. This album was one of the biggest hits of the series "Xuxa só Para Baixinhos". It reached the #8 position in the ranking of the most sold CDs and #5 place among the DVDs, according to the Associação Brasileira dos Produtores de Discos. The success of "Xuxa Circo", led to the launch of a tour in Brazil, which was later released on DVD live.

== 2005: XSPB 6 - Festa ==
Xuxa só Para Baixinhos 6 or Festa (also known as XSPB 6) is the twenty-ninth studio album and the twenty-second in Portuguese by Brazilian singer and TV host Xuxa, is the sixth album of the "Só Para Baixinhos" collection, was released on December 9, 2005. The album Sold more than 1,000,000 copies on DVD, yielding diamond disk. It was released in the formats VHS, CD, DVD and Blu-Ray, and also was released a bootleg in K7 of the album. XSPB 6 was the seventh best selling CD of the year in Brazil, and the third among DVDs.

Xuxa Festa was nominated to the Latin Grammy Award for Best Latin Children's Album. A Spanish version was recorded but never officially released.

== 2007: XSPB 7 - Brincadeiras ==
Xuxa só para Baixinhos - Brincadeiras (also known as XSPB 7) is the thirtieth studio album and the twenty-third in Portuguese by Brazilian singer and TV host Xuxa, is the seventh album of the "Só Para Baixinhos" collection, was released on July 7, 2007. XSPB 7 sold another 100,000 copies, making it the eighth best selling DVD in Brazil in 2007. In late 2014, XSPB 6, 7 and 8 were released on Blu-ray by Som Livre.

== 2008: XSPB 8 - Escola ==
Xuxa só para Baixinhos 8 - Escola (also known as XSPB 8) is the thirty-first studio album and the twenty-fourth in Portuguese by Brazilian singer Xuxa Meneghel, is the eighth album of the "Só Para Baixinhos" collection, was released on September 13, 2008. The album sold more than 371,000 copies, the DVD of this album was one of the best selling in 2009 in Brazil.

== 2009: XSPB 9 - Natal Mágico ==
Xuxa só Para Baixinhos 9 or Natal Mágico (also known as XSPB 9) is the thirty-second studio album and the twenty-fifth in Portuguese by Brazilian singer Xuxa, is the ninth album of the "Só Para Baixinhos" collection, was released on October 5, 2009. This was the first album in the collection "Só Para Baixinhos" released by the label Sony Music. XSPB 9 sold more than 150,000 copies and was one of the best selling albums in Brazil. It was initially released in Digipack format.

== 2010: XSPB 10 - Baixinhos, Bichinhos e + ==
Xuxa só Para Baixinhos 10 - Baixinhos, Bichinhos e + (also known as XSPB 10) is the thirty-third studio album and the twenty-sixth in Portuguese by Brazilian singer and TV host Xuxa Meneghel, is the tenth album of the "Só Para Baixinhos" collection, was released on August 29, 2010. XSPB 10 sold more than 300,000 copies.

== 2011: XSPB 11 - Sustentabilidade ==
Xuxa só para Baixinhos 11 or Sustentabilidade (also known as XSPB 11) is the thirty-fourth studio album and the twenty-seventh in Portuguese by Brazilian singer and TV host Xuxa Meneghel, is the eleventh album of the "Só Para Baixinhos" collection, was released in the September 18, 2011. This was the first 3D DVD produced in Brazil. There are two clips in 3D to be displayed in Blu-ray format. A total of $1 million was invested - the highest in Sony's history for the recording of a DVD. The album sold over 150,000 copies, winning the triple platinum disc. XSPB 11 was nominated for Latin Grammy Award for Best Latin Children's Album in 2012.

== 2013: XSPB 12 - É Pra Dançar ==
Xuxa só para Baixinhos 12 or É Para Dançar (also known as XSPB 12) is the thirty-fifth studio album and the twenty-eighth in Portuguese by Brazilian singer Xuxa, is the twelfth album of the "Só Para Baixinhos" collection, was released on June 29, 2013. XSPB 12 sold in three months 50,000 copies, getting certified platinum. "É Pra Dançar" was nominated for the Latin Grammy Award for Best Latin Children's Album in 2014.

== 2016: XSPB 13 - ABC do XSPB ==
Xuxa só para Baixinhos 13 or ABC do XSPB (also known as XSPB 13) is the thirty sixth studio album and the twenty-ninth in Portuguese by Brazilian singer Xuxa, is the thirteenth album of the "Só Para Baixinhos" collection, was released on December 16, 2016.
