= Naba =

Naba may refer to: নব

== Places ==
- Al Naba'ah, an area of the emirate of Sharjah in the United Arab Emirates
- Mong-Naba, a village in the Zoaga Department of Boulgou Province in south-eastern Burkina Faso
- Naba, Sagaing, Burma
- Naba-Sougdin, a village in the Tenkodogo Department of Boulgou Province in south-eastern Burkina Faso
- Angkringan NaBa,

== Others ==
- An-Naba, the 78th sura (chapter) of the Qur'an
- Al-Naba, a newspaper of the Islamic State of Iraq and the Levant
- Mogho Naba, King of the Mossi, an ethnic group in Burkina Faso
- Moro-Naba Ceremony, a weekly event in Ouagadougou, Burkina Faso
- Naba language, a language spoken in Chad
- "Taba naba", a children's song from the Torres Strait Islands north of Australia
- An older name for Naha, Okinawa, Japan

== Acronym ==
- National Adult Baseball Association
- National Air Barrier Association
- North American Boxing Association, an affiliate of the World Boxing Association
- North American Broadcasters Association
- North American Butterfly Association
- Nuova Accademia di Belle Arti, a privately run university in Milan, Italy
- National Association of Black Accountants

== See also ==
- Nabaa (disambiguation)
- Nabas (disambiguation)
