= Framing (construction) =

Construction technique

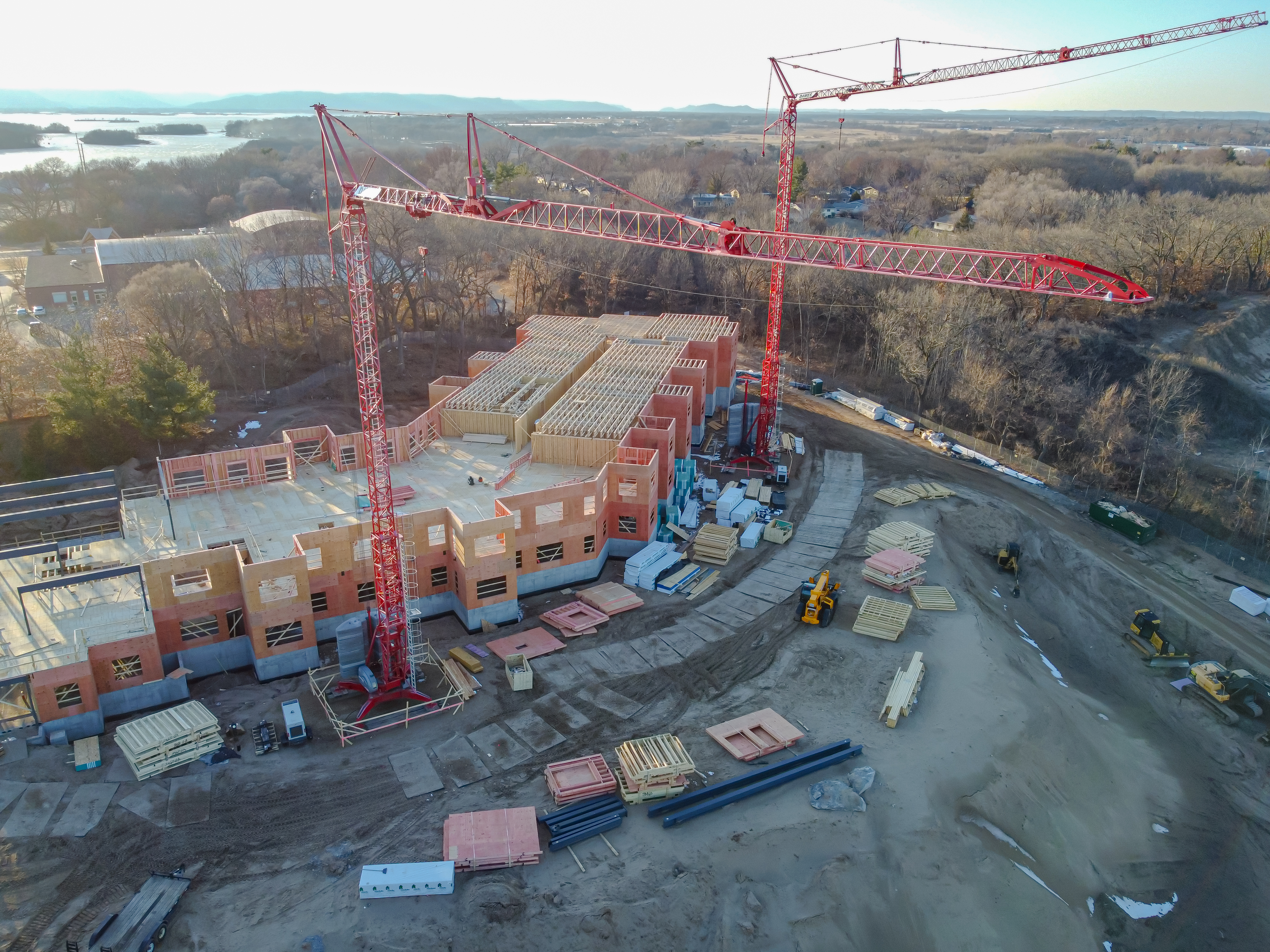
Prefabricated framing walls at a construction site with tower cranes

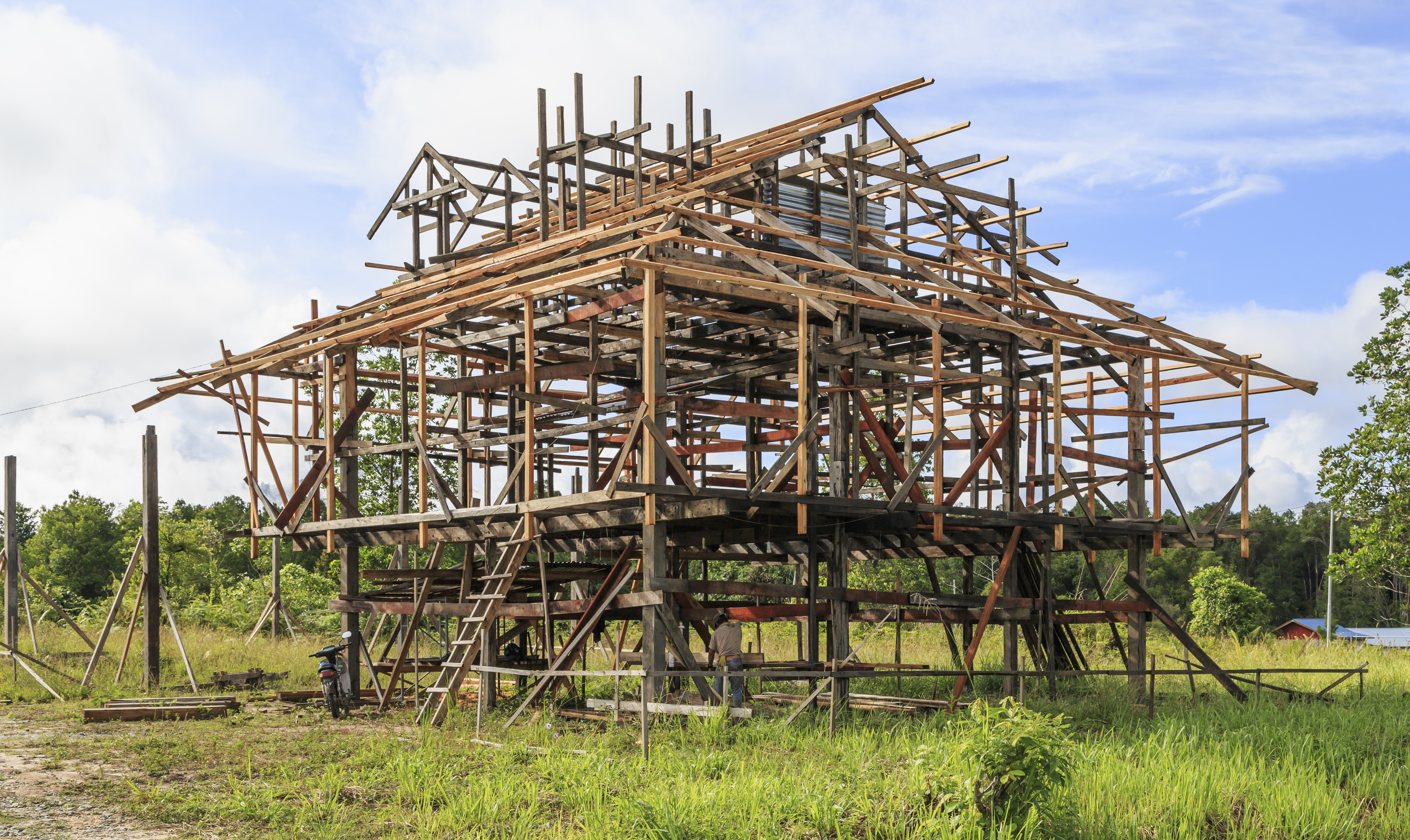
The erection of a wooden frame in Sabah, Malaysia

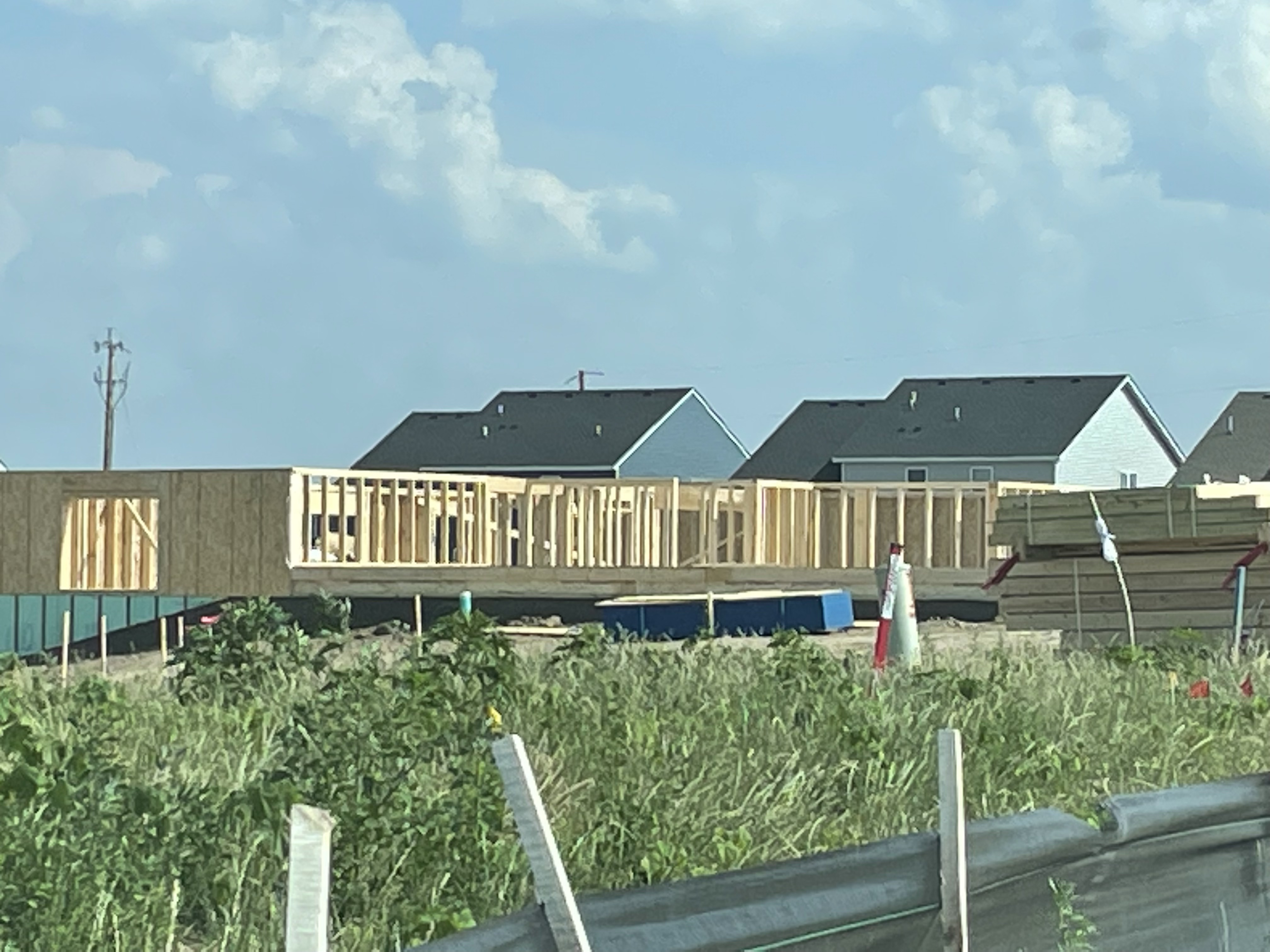
The construction frames of a residential subdivision in Rogers, Minnesota in 2023

Framing, in construction, is the fitting together of pieces to give a structure, particularly a building, support and shape. Framing materials are usually wood, engineered wood, or structural steel. The alternative to framed construction is generally called mass wall construction, where horizontal layers of stacked materials such as log building, masonry, rammed earth, adobe, etc. are used without framing.

Building framing is divided into two broad categories, heavy-frame construction (heavy framing) if the vertical supports are few and heavy such as in timber framing, pole building framing, or steel framing; or light-frame construction (light-framing) if the supports are more numerous and smaller, such as balloon, platform, light-steel framing and pre-built framing. Light-frame construction using standardized dimensional lumber has become the dominant construction method in North America and Australia due to the economy of the method; use of minimal structural material allows builders to enclose a large area at minimal cost while achieving a wide variety of architectural styles.

Modern light-frame structures usually gain strength from rigid panels (plywood and other plywood-like composites such as oriented strand board (OSB) used to form all or part of wall sections), but until recently carpenters employed various forms of diagonal bracing to stabilize walls. Diagonal bracing remains a vital interior part of many roof systems, and in-wall wind braces are required by building codes in many municipalities or by individual state laws in the United States. Special framed shear walls are becoming more common to help buildings meet the requirements of earthquake engineering and wind engineering.

== History ==
Historically, people fitted naturally shaped wooden poles together as framework and then began using joints to connect the timbers, a method today called traditional timber framing or log framing. In the United States, timber framing was superseded by balloon framing beginning in the 1830s. Balloon framing makes use of many lightweight wall members called studs rather than fewer, heavier supports called posts; balloon framing components are nailed together rather than fitted using joinery. The studs in a balloon frame extend two stories from sill to plate. Platform framing superseded balloon framing and is the standard wooden framing method today. The name comes from each floor level being framed as a separate unit or platform. The use of factory-made walls and floors has shown an increase in popularity due to the time-saving and cost-efficiency. (Pre-fabrication) Walls are made usually in facilities and then shipped to the different job sites. This process of framing has improved the speed of framing on site.

Framed construction was rarely used in Scandinavia before the 20th century because of the abundant availability of wood, an abundance of cheap labour, and the superiority of the thermal insulation of logs. Hence timber framing was used first for unheated buildings such as farm buildings, outbuildings and summer villas, but for houses only with the development of wall insulation.

Timber frame construction

Balloon frame construction

Platform frame construction

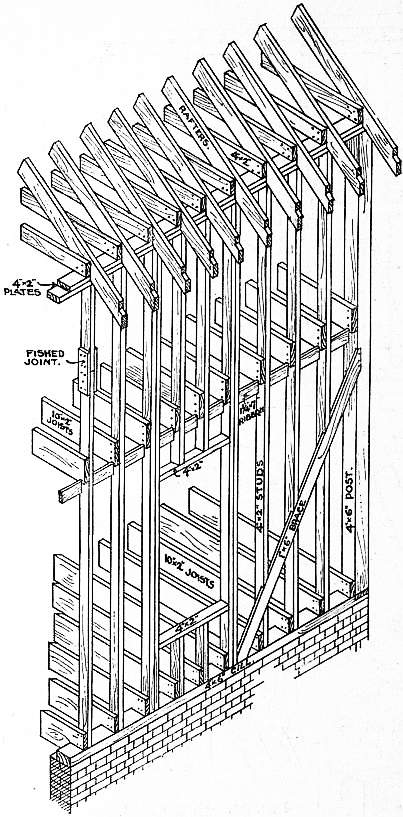
Elements of a balloon frame

== Walls ==
Wall framing in house construction includes the vertical and horizontal members of exterior walls and interior partitions, both of bearing walls and non-bearing walls. These stick members, referred to as studs, wall plates and lintels (sometimes called headers), serve as a nailing base for all covering material and support the upper floor platforms, which provide the lateral strength along a wall. The platforms may be the boxed structure of a ceiling and roof, or the ceiling and floor joists of the story above. In the building trades, the technique is variously referred to as stick framing, stick and platform, or stick and box, as the sticks (studs) give the structure its vertical support, and the box-shaped floor sections with joists contained within length-long post and lintels (more commonly called headers), support the weight of whatever is above, including the next wall up and the roof above the top story. The platform also provides lateral support against wind and holds the stick walls true and square. Any lower platform supports the weight of the platforms and walls above the level of its component headers and joists.

In some countries, framing lumber is subject to regulated standards that require a grade-stamp, and a moisture content not exceeding 19%.

There are four historically common methods of framing a house.

- Post and beam, which is now used predominantly in barn construction.
- Braced frame construction, also known as full frame, half frame, New England braced frame, combination frame an early form of light framing which survived into the 1940s in the northeastern United States, defined by the continued use of girts, corner posts, and braces, most often mortised, tenoned, and pegged with nailed studs.
- Balloon framing using a technique suspending floors from the walls was common until the late 1940s, but since that time, platform framing has become the predominant form of house construction.
- Platform framing often forms wall sections horizontally on the sub-floor prior to erection, easing positioning of studs and increasing accuracy while cutting the necessary manpower. The top and bottom plates are end-nailed to each stud with two nails at least 3 1/4 in (83 mm) in length (16d or 16-penny nails). Studs are at least doubled (creating posts) at openings, the jack stud being cut to receive the lintels (headers) that are placed and end-nailed through the outer studs.

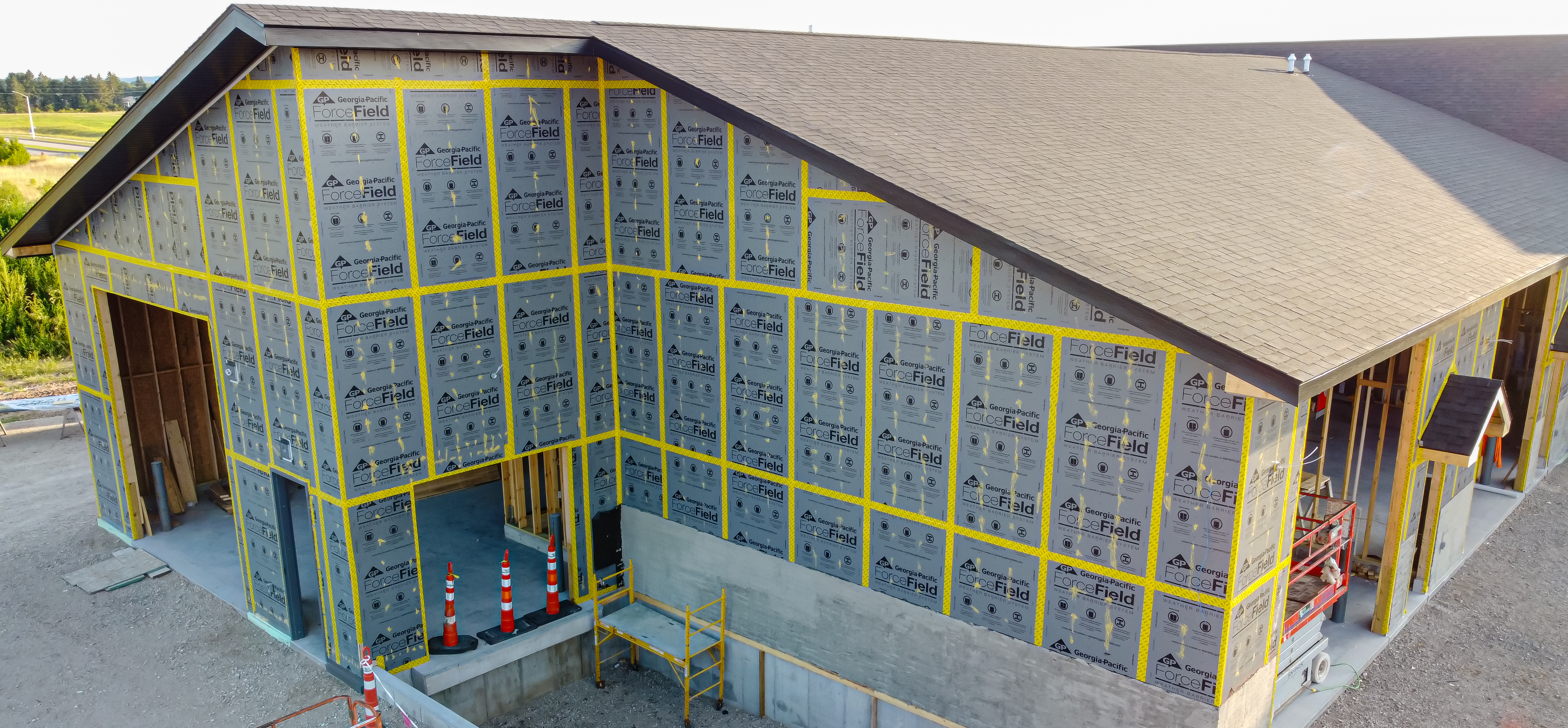
Moisture barrier sheathing with flashing tape

Wall sheathing, usually a plywood or other laminate, is usually applied to the framing prior to erection, thus eliminating the need to scaffold, and again increasing speed and cutting manpower needs and expenses. Some types of exterior sheathing, such as asphalt-impregnated fiberboard, plywood, oriented strand board and waferboard, will provide adequate bracing to resist lateral loads and keep the wall square (construction codes in most jurisdictions require a stiff plywood sheathing). Others, such as rigid glass-fiber, asphalt-coated fiberboard, polystyrene or polyurethane board, will not. In this latter case, the wall should be reinforced with diagonal wood or metal bracing inset into the studs. In jurisdictions subject to strong wind storms (hurricane countries, Tornado Alley) local codes or state law will generally require both the diagonal wind braces and the stiff exterior sheathing regardless of the type and kind of outer weather resistant coverings.

Finally, the outside of the wall sheathing will usually be covered with siding, to protect it from the elements and for decorative reasons.

=== Corners ===
A multiple-stud post of at least 3 three studs, is generally used at exterior corners and intersections to secure a good tie between adjoining walls. It provides nailing support for interior finishes and exterior sheathing. Corners and intersections, however, must be framed with at least two studs.

Nailing support for the edges of the ceiling is required at the junction of the wall and ceiling where partitions run parallel to the ceiling joists. This material is commonly referred to as dead wood or backing.

=== Exterior wall studs ===
Wall framing in house construction includes the vertical and horizontal members of exterior walls and interior partitions. These members, referred to as studs, wall plates and lintels, serve as a nailing base for all covering material and support the upper floors, ceiling and roof.

Exterior wall studs are the vertical members to which the wall sheathing and cladding are attached. They are supported on a bottom plate or foundation sill and in turn support the top plate. Studs usually consist of 1 1/2-by-3 1/2-inch (38 mm × 89 mm) or 1 1/2-by-5 1/2-inch (38 mm × 140 mm) lumber and are commonly spaced at 16 inches (410 mm) on center. This spacing may be changed to 12 or 24 inches (300 or 610 mm) on center depending on the load and the limitations imposed by the type and thickness of the wall covering used. Wider 1 1/2-by-5 1/2-inch studs may be used to provide space for more insulation. Insulation beyond that which can be accommodated within a 3 1/2-inch stud space can also be provided by other means, such as rigid or semi-rigid insulation or batts between 1 1/2-by-1 1/2-inch horizontal furring strips, or rigid or semi-rigid insulation sheathing to the outside of the studs. The studs are attached to horizontal top and bottom wall plates of 1 1/2-inch lumber that are the same width as the studs.

=== Interior partitions ===
Interior partitions supporting floor, ceiling or roof loads are called loadbearing walls; others are called non-loadbearing or simply partitions. Interior loadbearing walls are framed in the same way as exterior walls. Studs are usually 1 1/2 in × 3 1/2 in (38 mm × 89 mm) lumber spaced at 16 in (410 mm) on center. This spacing may be changed to 12 or 24 in (300 or 610 mm) depending on the loads supported and the type and thickness of the wall finish used.

Partitions can be built with 1 1/2 in × 2 1/2 in (38 mm × 64 mm) or 1 1/2 in × 3 1/2 in (38 mm × 89 mm) studs spaced at 16 or 24 in (410 or 610 mm) on center depending on the type and thickness of the wall finish used. Where a partition does not contain a swinging door, 1 1/2 in × 3 1/2 in (38 mm × 89 mm) studs at 16 in (410 mm) on center are sometimes used with the wide face of the stud parallel to the wall. This is usually done only for partitions enclosing clothes closets or cupboards to save space. Since there is no vertical load to be supported by partitions, single studs may be used at door openings. The top of the opening may be bridged with a single piece of 1 1/2 in (38 mm) lumber the same width as the studs. These members provide a nailing support for wall finish, door frames and trim.

=== Lintels (headers) ===
Lintels (or, headers) are the horizontal members placed over window, door and other openings to carry loads to the adjoining studs. Lintels are usually constructed of two pieces of 2 in (nominal) (38 mm) lumber separated with spacers to the width of the studs and nailed together to form a single unit. Lintels are predominately nailed together without spacers to form a solid beam and allow the remaining cavity to be filled with insulation from the inside. The preferable spacer material is rigid insulation. The depth of a lintel is determined by the width of the opening and vertical loads supported.

=== Wall sections ===
A typical wall section in platform framing: 1. Cripple; 2. Window header; 3. Top plate / upper wall plate; 4. Window sill; 5. Stud; 6. Sill plate / sole plate / bottom plate

The complete wall sections are then raised and put in place, temporary braces added and the bottom plates nailed through the subfloor to the floor framing members. The braces should have their larger dimension on the vertical and should permit adjustment of the vertical position of the wall.

Once the assembled sections are plumbed, they are nailed together at the corners and intersections. A strip of polyethylene is often placed between the interior walls and the exterior wall, and above the first top plate of interior walls before the second top plate is applied to attain continuity of the air barrier when polyethylene is serving this function.

A second top plate, with joints offset at least one stud space away from the joints in the plate beneath, is then added. This second top plate usually laps the first plate at the corners and partition intersections and, when nailed in place, provides an additional tie to the framed walls. Where the second top plate does not lap the plate immediately underneath at corner and partition intersections, these may be tied with 0.036 in (0.91 mm) galvanized steel plates at least 3 in (76 mm) wide and 6 in (150 mm) long, nailed with at least three 2 1/2 in (64 mm) nails to each wall.

== Braced frame ==
Braced frame construction, also known as full frame, half frame, New England braced frame, combination frame, is an early form of light framing developed from the heavier timber framing which preceded it. It is defined by the continued use of girts, corner posts, and braces. The pieces are mortised, tenoned, and pegged with the studs nailed to the girts and sills. Due to the early introduction of sawmills (as early as 1635 in New Hampshire), as early as 1637 timber frames in the northeastern English colonies in North America made use of light studs between the heavier corners. Norman Isham wrote, "sometimes the frame was covered with vertical boarding applied to the sills, plates, and girts without any intermediate framing, but in a greater number of houses the spaces between the heavier timbers are filled with lighter vertical sticks called studs." The growth of a nail-making industry in the early 19th century made the frame even faster to assemble, with some of the first machines developed in the late 1700s in Massachusetts. Jacob Perkins of Newburyport, Massachusetts, invented a machine which could produce 10,000 nails a day.

Three-decker buildings in New England were commonly constructed with this form, which is noted on period building permits as "mortised frame."

Its use survived into the 1940s in the northeastern United States, when it was gradually replaced by the platform frame.

== Balloon framing ==
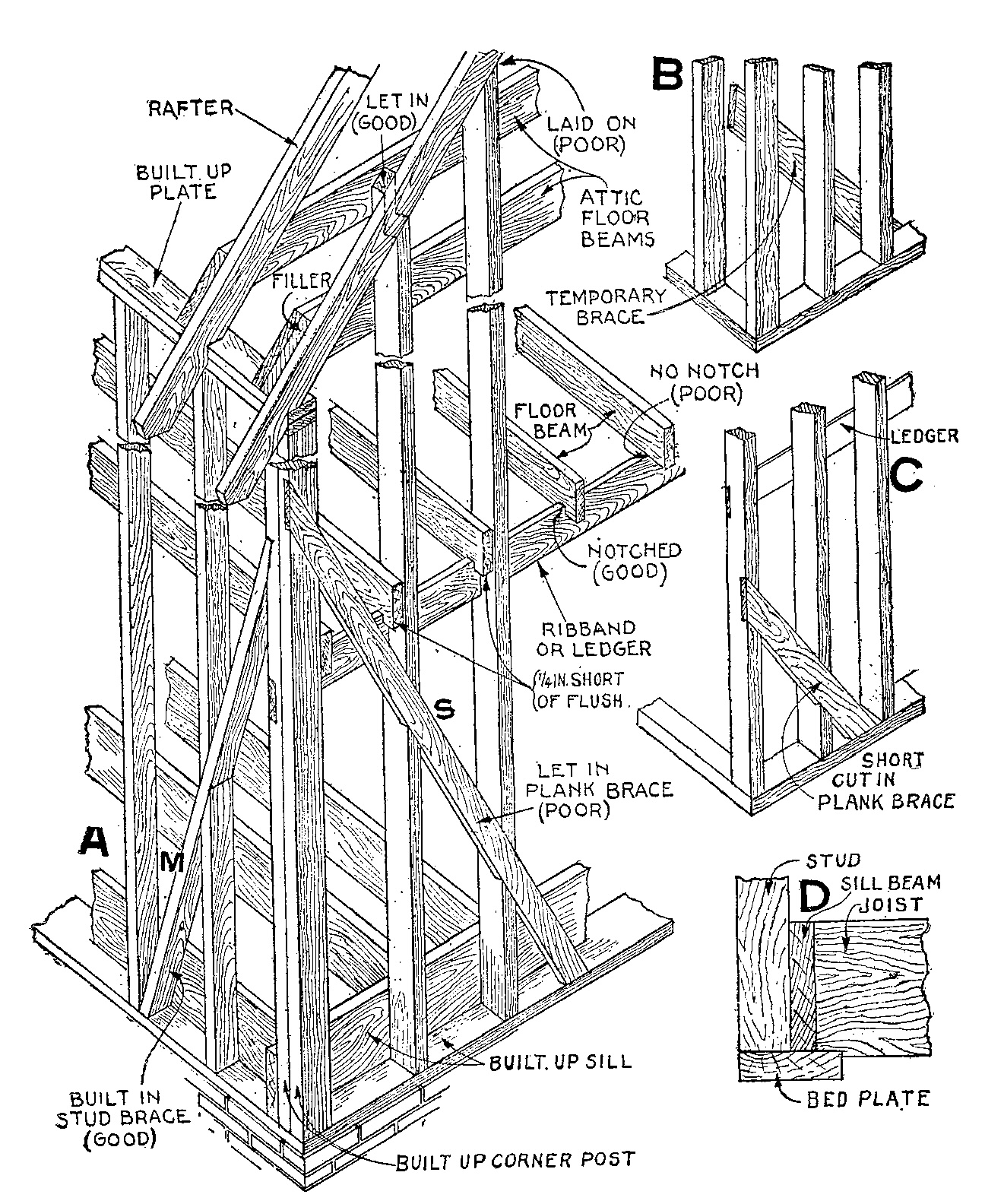
Drawing showing the layout of wood in a balloon framed house (1923)

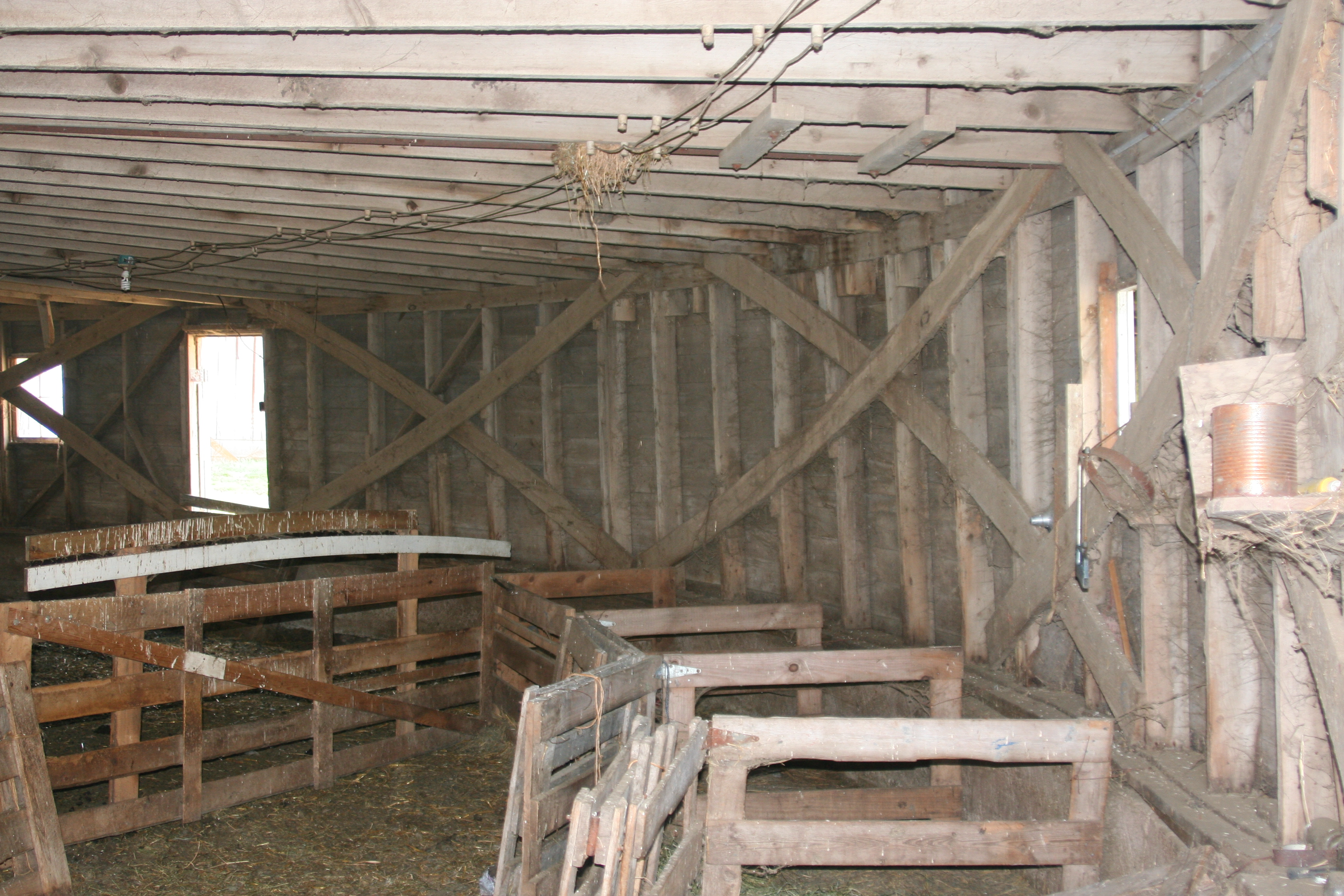
An unusual example of balloon framing: The Jim Kaney Round Barn, Adeline, Illinois, U.S.

Balloon framing is a method of wood construction used primarily in areas rich in softwood forests such as Scandinavia, Canada, the United States (up until the mid-1950s), and around Thetford Forest in Norfolk, England. The name comes from a French Missouri type of construction, maison en boulin, boulin being a French term for a horizontal scaffolding support. It was also known as "Chicago construction" in the 19th century.

Balloon framing uses long continuous framing members (wall studs) that run from the sill plate to the top plate, with intermediate floor structures let into and nailed to them. The heights of window sills, headers and next floor height would be marked out on the studs with a story pole. Once popular when long lumber was plentiful, balloon framing has been largely replaced by platform framing.

It is not certain who introduced balloon framing in the United States. Early 19th century buildings in Ste. Genevieve, Missouri, may be precursors to the balloon frame. The first building clearly using balloon framing was a warehouse constructed in 1832 in Chicago by George Washington Snow or Augustine Deodat Taylor. Both men arrived in Chicago from New England, where the use of light framing timber was already common. Architectural critic Sigfried Giedion cites Chicago architect John M. Van Osdel's 1880s attribution, as well as A. T. Andreas' 1885 History of Chicago, to credit Snow as 'inventor of the balloon frame method'. In 1833, Taylor constructed the first Catholic church in Chicago, St. Mary's, using the balloon framing method; this building was moved and reconstructed multiple times before burning in the Great Chicago Fire in 1871.

In the 1830s, Solon Robinson published articles about a revolutionary new framing system, called "balloon framing" by later builders. Robinson's system calls for standard 2×4 lumber nailed together to form a sturdy, light skeleton. Builders were reluctant to adopt the technology; however, by the 1880s, some form of 2×4 framing was standard.

Although lumber was plentiful in 19th-century America, skilled labor was not. The advent of cheap machine-made nails, along with hydo-powered sawmills in the early 19th century made balloon framing highly attractive, because it did not require highly skilled carpenters, as did the dovetail joints, mortises and tenons required by post-and-beam construction. For the first time, any farmer could build his own buildings without a time-consuming learning curve.

It has been said that balloon framing populated the western United States and the western provinces of Canada. Without it, western boomtowns certainly could not have blossomed overnight. However, balloon framing did require very long studs, and as tall trees were exhausted in the 1920s, platform framing became prevalent.

Balloon framing presents challenges in firefighting, since many older balloon-framed buildings lack firestops or fire blocking in the open framing cavities, and a fire can spread vertically in a short time. Since the floor framing and wall framing cavities interconnect, fire can rapidly spread throughout the structure. Many balloon-framed buildings predate the introduction of building codes that mandate fire blocking, and a fire can spread from basement to attic in minutes.

The main difference between platform and balloon framing is at the floor lines. The balloon wall studs extend from the sill of the first story all the way to the top plate or end rafter of the second story. The platform-framed wall, on the other hand, is independent for each floor.

== Materials ==
Light-frame materials are most often wood or rectangular steel, tubes or C-channels. Wood pieces are typically connected with nail fasteners, nails, or screws; steel pieces are connected with pan-head framing screws, or nuts and bolts. Preferred species for linear structural members are softwoods such as spruce, pine and fir. Light frame material dimensions range from 38 by 89 mm (1.5 by 3.5 in); i.e., a dimensional number two-by-four to 5 cm by 30 cm (two-by-twelve inches) at the cross-section, and lengths ranging from 2.5 metres (8.2 ft) for walls to 7 metres (23 ft) or more for joists and rafters. Recently, architects have begun experimenting with pre-cut modular aluminum framing to reduce on-site construction costs.

Wall panels built of studs are interrupted by sections that provide rough openings for doors and windows. Openings are typically spanned by a header or lintel that bears the weight of the structure above the opening. Headers are usually built to rest on trimmers, also called jacks. Areas around windows are defined by a sill beneath the window, and cripples, which are shorter studs that span the area from the bottom plate to the sill and sometimes from the top of the window to a header, or from a header to a top plate. Diagonal bracings made of wood or steel provide shear (horizontal strength) as do panels of sheeting nailed to studs, sills and headers.

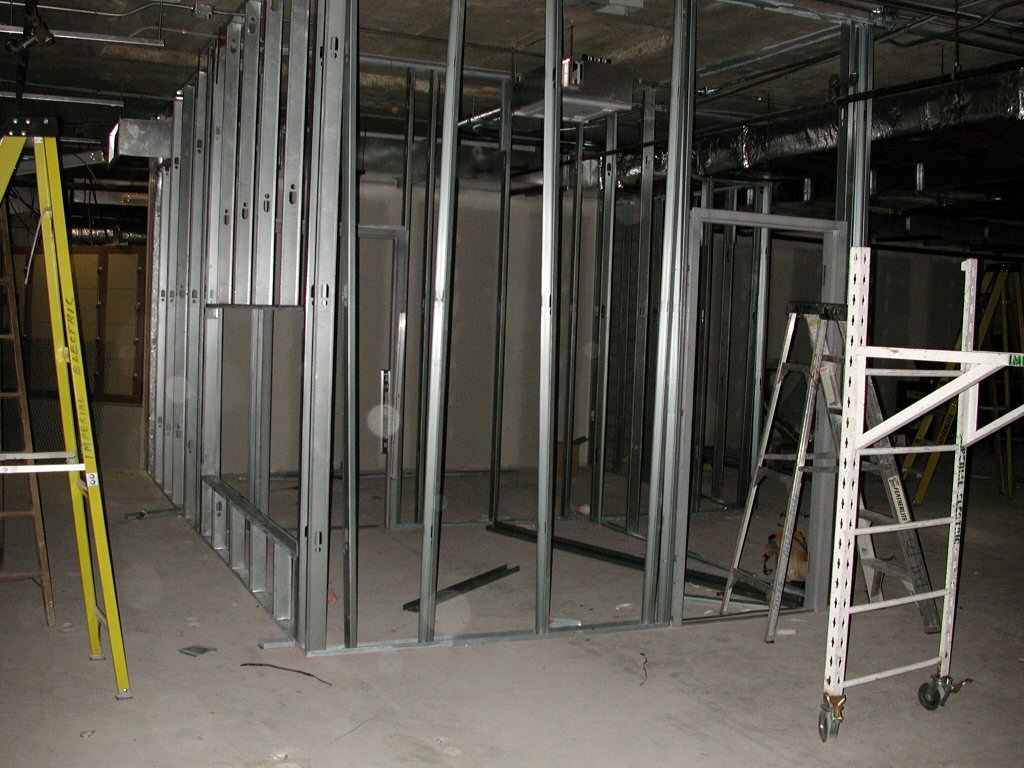
Light-gauge metal stud framing

Wall sections usually include a bottom plate which is secured to the structure of a floor, and one, or more often two top plates that tie walls together and provide a bearing for structures above the wall. Wood or steel floor frames usually include a rim joist around the perimeter of a system of floor joists, and often include bridging material near the center of a span to prevent lateral buckling of the spanning members. In two-story construction, openings are left in the floor system for a stairwell, in which stair risers and treads are most often attached to squared faces cut into sloping stair stringers.

Interior wall coverings in light-frame construction typically include wallboard, lath and plaster or decorative wood paneling.

Exterior finishes for walls and ceilings often include plywood or composite sheathing, brick or stone veneers, and various stucco finishes. Cavities between studs, usually placed 40–60 cm (16–24 in) apart, are usually filled with insulation materials, such as fiberglass batting, or cellulose filling sometimes made of recycled newsprint treated with boron additives for fire prevention and vermin control.

In natural building, straw bales, cob and adobe may be used for both exterior and interior walls.

The part of a structural building that goes diagonally across a wall is called a T-bar. It stops the walls from collapsing in gusty winds.

Pressure-treated wood is used when a bottom plate is exposed to outside moisture, even when in contact with concrete.

== Roofs ==
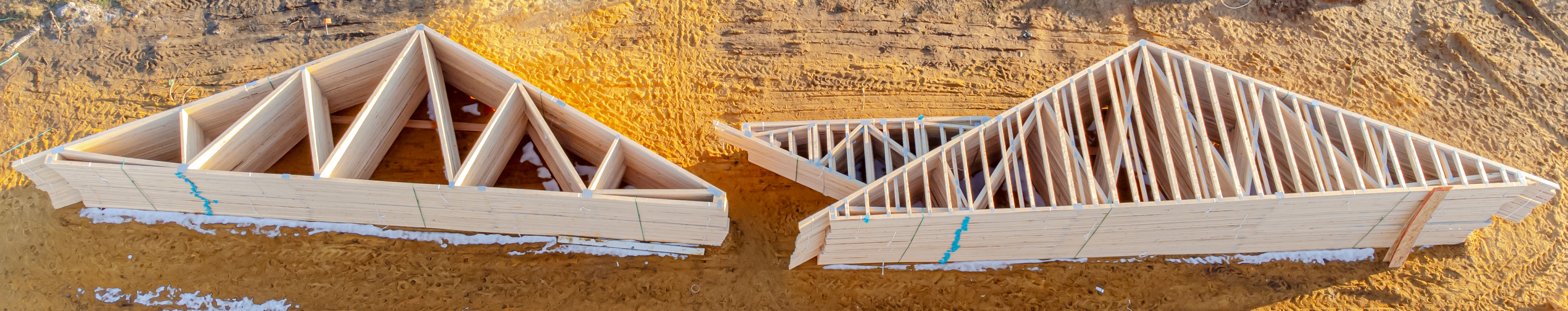
Trusses lying on the ground

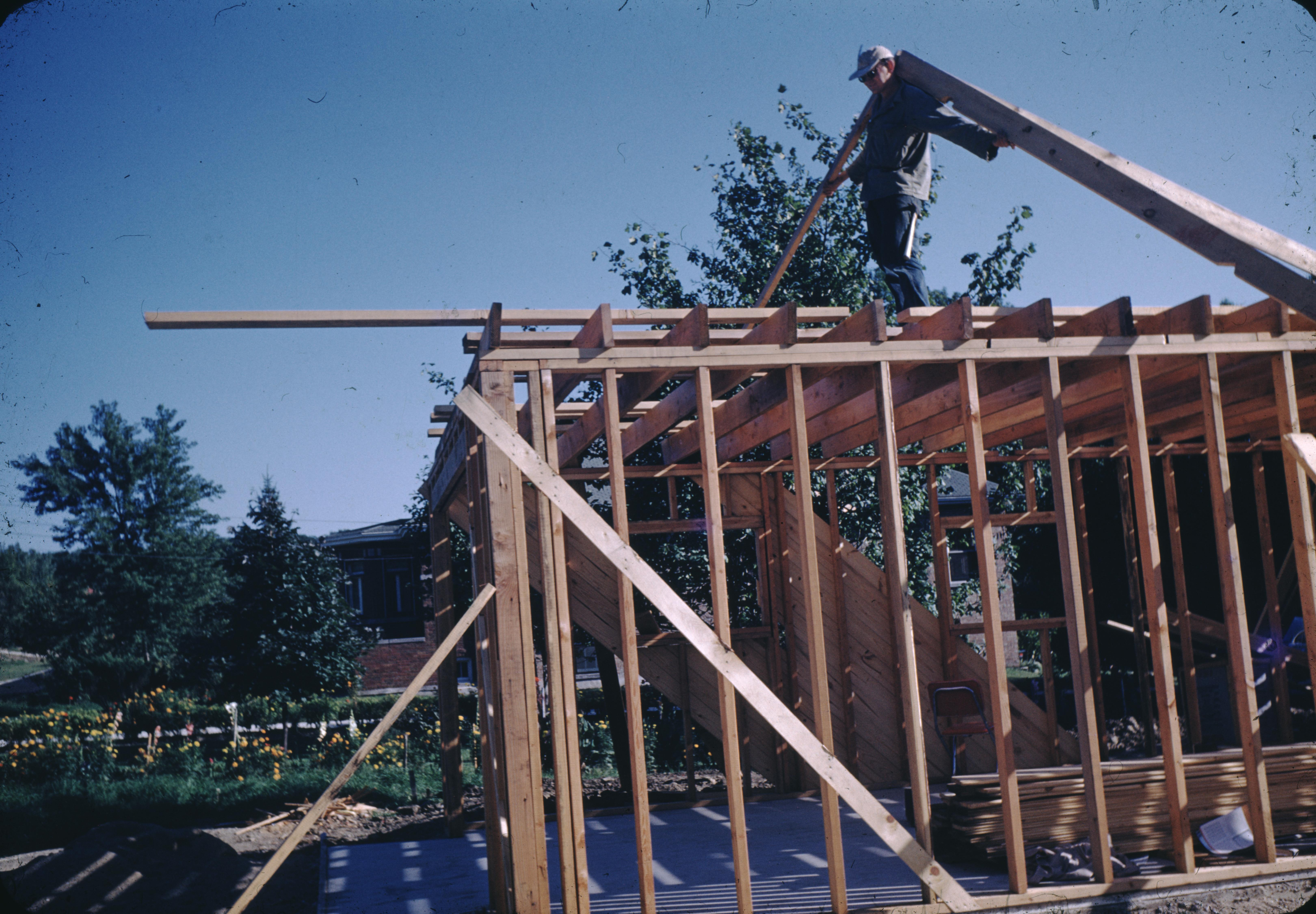
An early step in framing a roof in the United States c. 1955. The carpenter is carrying two roof rafters joined to a ridge pole to set them in place on the far end of the structure.

Roofs are usually built to provide a sloping surface intended to shed rain or snow, with slopes ranging from 1:15 (less than an inch per linear foot of horizontal span), to steep slopes of more than 2:1. A light-frame structure built mostly inside sloping walls which also serve as a roof is called an A-frame.

In North America, roofs are often covered with shingles made of asphalt, fiberglass and small gravel coating, but a wide range of materials are used. Molten tar is often used to waterproof flatter roofs, but newer materials include rubber and synthetic materials. Steel panels are popular roof coverings in some areas, preferred for their durability. Slate or tile roofs offer more historic coverings for light-frame roofs.

Light-frame methods allow easy construction of unique roof designs; hip roofs, for example, slope toward walls on all sides and are joined at hip rafters that span from corners to a ridge. Valleys are formed when two sloping roof sections drain toward each other. Dormers are small areas in which vertical walls interrupt a roof line, and which are topped off by slopes at usually right angles to a main roof section. Gables are formed when a length-wise section of sloping roof ends to form a triangular wall section. Clerestories are formed by an interruption along the slope of a roof where a short vertical wall connects it to another roof section. Flat roofs, which usually include at least a nominal slope to shed water, are often surrounded by parapet walls with openings (called scuppers) to allow water to drain out. Sloping crickets are built into roofs to direct water away from areas of poor drainage, such as behind a chimney at the bottom of a sloping section.

== Structure ==
Light-frame buildings in areas with shallow or nonexistent frost depths are often erected on monolithic concrete-slab foundations that serve both as a floor and as a support for the structure. Other light-frame buildings are built over a crawlspace or a basement, with wood or steel joists used to span between foundation walls, usually constructed of poured concrete or concrete blocks.

Engineered components are commonly used to form floor, ceiling and roof structures in place of solid wood. I-joists (closed-web trusses) are often made from laminated woods, most often chipped poplar wood, in panels as thin as 1 cm (0.39 in), glued between horizontally laminated members of less than 4 cm by 4 cm (two-by-twos), to span distances of as much as 9 m (30 ft). Open web trussed joists and rafters are often formed of 4 cm by 9 cm (two-by-four) wood members to provide support for floors, roofing systems and ceiling finishes.

Platform framing was traditionally limited to four floors but some jurisdictions have modified their building codes to allow up to six floors with added fire protection.

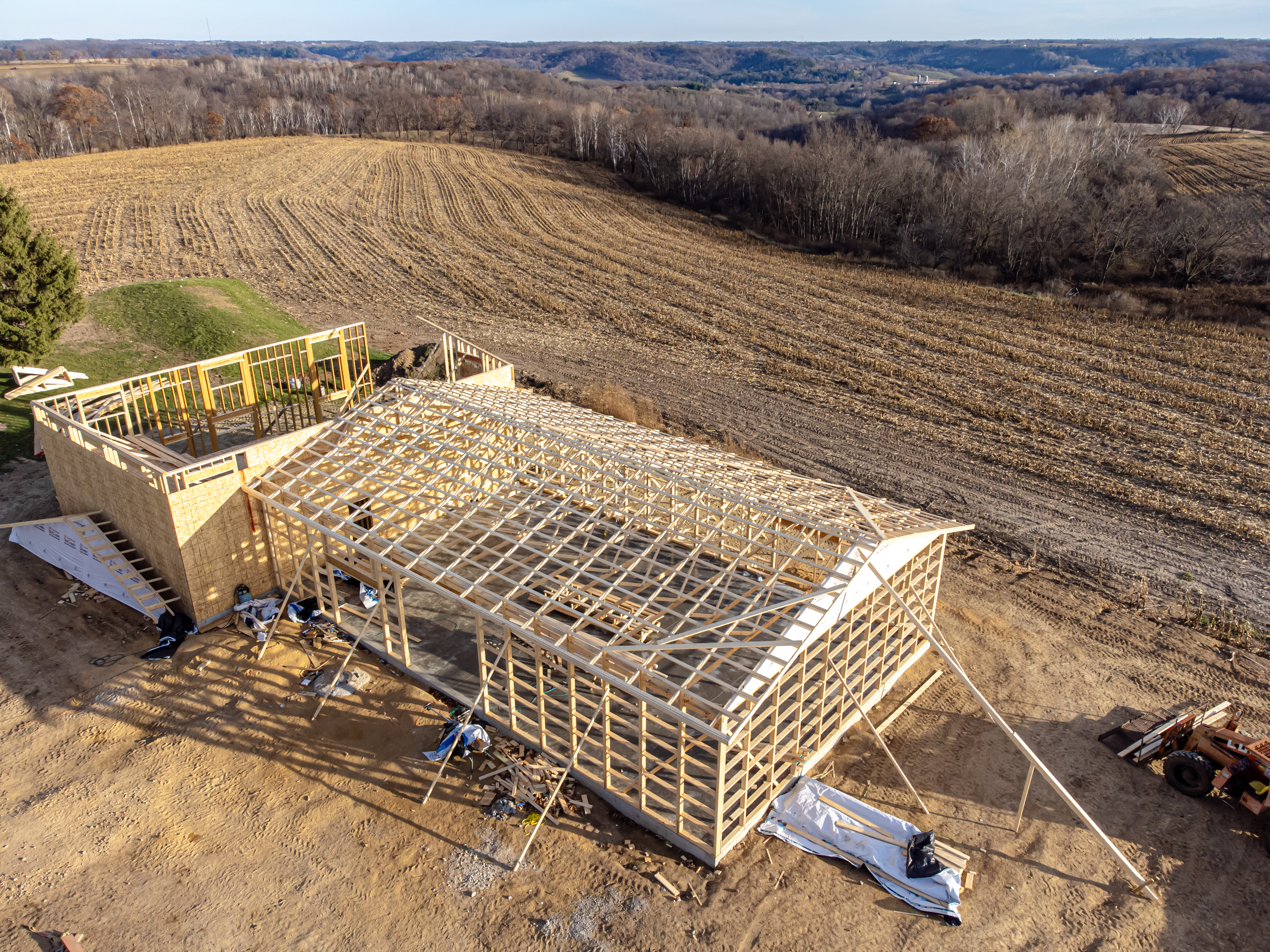
Post frame garage connected to traditional frame house

== See also ==
- Concrete frame
- Framer
- Light timber construction schools
- Log building
- Steel frame
- Termite shield
- Tessellated roof
- Timber framing

== Literature ==
- Canada Mortgage and Housing Corporation (2005). Canadian Wood-Frame House Construction. ISBN 0-660-19535-6.
