= Termite barrier =

Material for termite protection

Termite barriers are materials that have been specifically designed to prevent subterranean termites from gaining access to a structure. Physical termite barriers are free of pesticides and physically block termite foraging activity. Development of physical barriers to effectively exclude subterranean termites makes it possible to design and build structures with a far lower possibility of termite invasion and damage over the life of the building. Because of their small size (0.02 inches (0.51 mm) long), impressive reproductive capability (a termite queen produces one egg every 3 seconds, or over 10 million eggs per year), and ability to eat through many construction materials, termites are the most destructive of all insects.

Termite shields, an early physical barrier, are sheet metal fabrications used for decades in light frame construction. Termite shields are often applied underneath wood sill plates. They are designed to force termites to build their mud tubes outside of the structure, where they become visible to a trained pest management professional. (See Termite shield)

== Membranes ==
Termite membrane barriers consist of elastomeric sealants adhered to a high-strength backing. When included in the building envelope, membrane barriers perform multiple functions. In addition to excluding termites and insects, they act as waterproofing, air barrier, and vapor barrier.

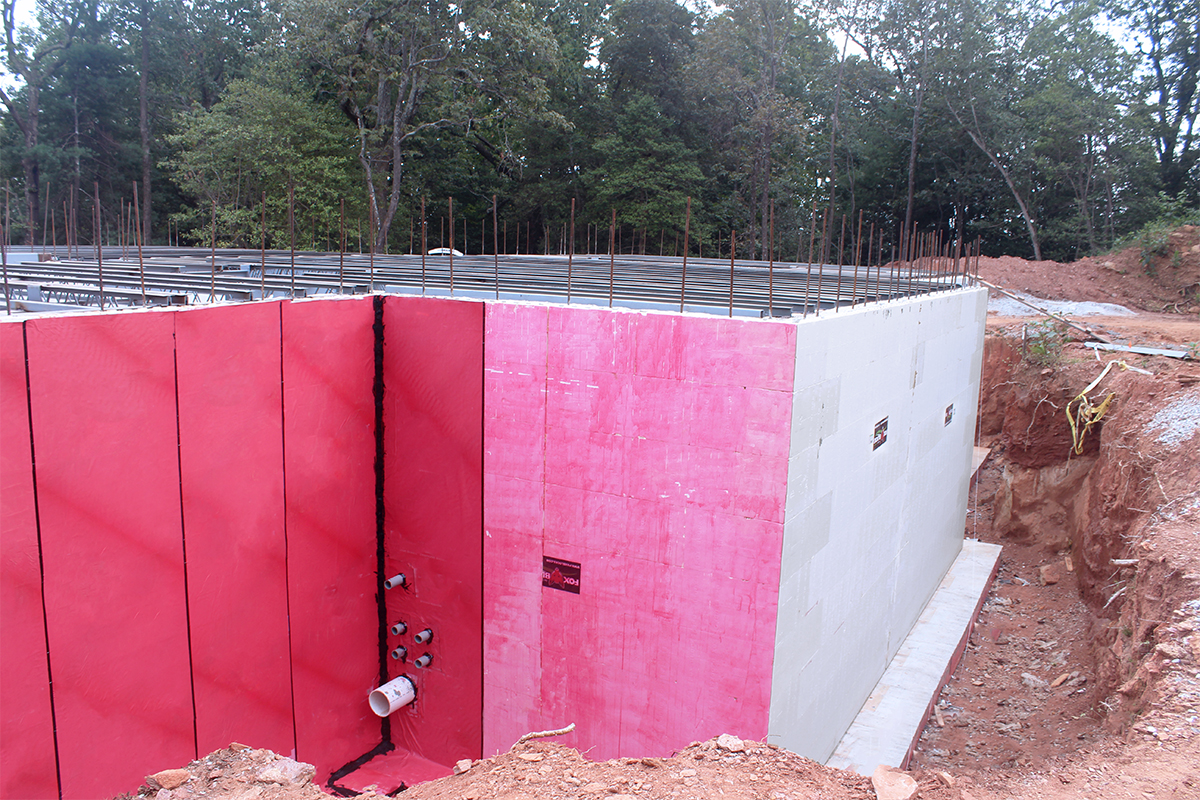
A Formosan termite and waterproofing barrier installed on a foundation in Greenville, SC

Applications for termite membranes include on concrete foundation walls, ICF insulated concrete forms, under-slab waterproofing, under-sill plates, flooring underlayments, and as wall, window, and door flashings, among others. Most termite membranes must be implemented during the construction process.

== Sealants ==
Termite sealant materials are the basic component of termite membranes described above. Sealants are elastomeric, meaning they move with the structure without tearing, and are available in a caulk or spreadable formulation. When caulked around a plumbing penetration in a structure, termite sealant barriers adhere to both the pipe and the concrete. As the structure moves during settling or due to expansive soils, the sealant barrier material maintains a barrier impenetrable by termites and other insects.

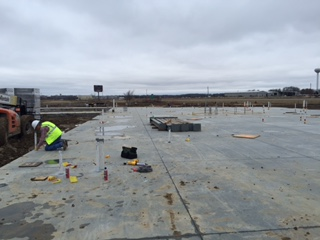
default

== Stainless steel screens ==
To effectively exclude subterranean termites, screen apertures smaller than 0.02 inches (0.5 mm) are required. Application areas for screens in the building envelope include weep holes, soffits, gable and ridge vents, among others.

== Particle barriers ==
Particulate termite barriers are widely used around the Pacific Basin. Developed commercially by University of Hawaii scientist Minord Tamashiro in the 1980s. However, particle barriers only recently became commercially available in the mainland United States. The principle behind particle barriers has been well researched by Ebeling and Pence (1957), Su et al. (1991), Su and Scheffrahn (1992), Yates et al. (2003), and Keefer et al. (2013). Basaltic termite particle barriers are used in Hawaii, but hardly any place else, because basaltic rock comes from volcano activity, which only takes place in isolated areas of the world. Any hard mineral, such as granite which is used in Australia, will work as a termite barrier if it has the requisite size and shape properties.

Research with particle barriers began at Texas A&M University in 2003. Various particle characteristics were evaluated, including size, angularity, and interstitial space between particles. This material can be installed around the exposed perimeter of a home or structure in a wedge formation that measures 4 inches (100 mm) across and 5 inches (130 mm) down, directly against the foundation.

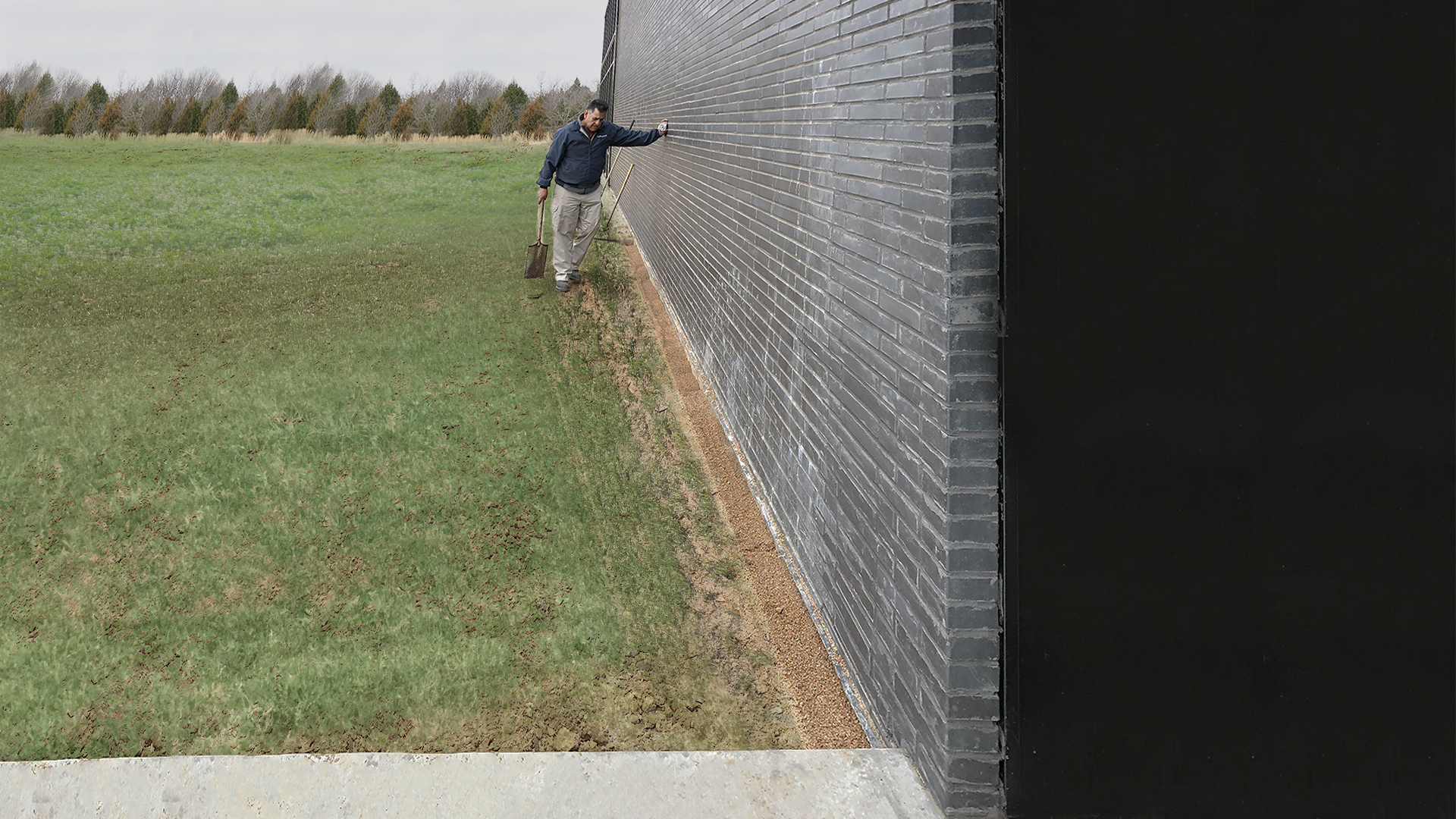
Stone particle barrier at exposed concrete foundation

Aggregate barriers have also shown success when installed in bath traps or slab leave-outs. During construction and after the foundation is poured, cardboard and other debris is removed from bath trap areas and the particle barrier is installed. Application of this material protects the structure from termite intrusion in a vulnerable entry point.

One problem with particle barriers is that there are erroneous references on the Web to the use of particle barriers to stop termites. One source says "use a sand barrier". Another says that "16 grit sand is acceptable". Although this loose specification is appreciated by some building contractors who can purchase "sand" or "16 grit sand" inexpensively at lumberyards and other outlets, it has the effect of damaging the credibility of particle barriers as a termite protection method. All of the research listed above, which took place at universities of California-Berkeley (1956), Hawaii (1982 - 2003), Florida (1992), and Texas A&M (2003 - 2013)pointed to sizes between 8 and 14 as being most effective.
