= Xuxa só para Baixinhos 4 – Praia =

Xuxa só para Baixinhos Vol. 4 – Praia

Studio album by Xuxa
- Released: 25 July 2003
- Recorded: 2003
- Genre: Children's music
- Length: 51:21
- Label: Som Livre
- Producer: Ary Sperling

Xuxa chronology
Só para Baixinhos Vol. 3 (2002)	Xuxa só para Baixinhos Vol. 4 – Praia (2003)	Só para Baixinhos Vol. 5 (2004)

Singles from Xuxa só para Baixinhos 4
- 1. "Estátua" Released: 2003; 2. "Hula-Hula da Xuxinha" Released: 2003; 3. "Taba Naba" Released: 2003; 4. "Skinimarinki" Released: 2003; 5. "Nadando com o Teddy" Released: 2003

Xuxa só para Baixinhos 4 – Praia (also known as XSPB 4) (transl. Only for Children Four – Beach) is the twenty-sixth studio album by Brazilian recording artist Xuxa, released on 25 July 2003 by Som Livre as the fourth album in the collection Só Para Baixinhos.

== Release and reception ==
Xuxa only for Baixinhos 4 - Praia, was released on July 25, 2003, first in the CD and VHS version and released on DVD on November 26, 2003, it was remastered and released on CD in 2008 in an economic version. The singles were "Estátua", "Hula Hula da Xuxinha", "Taba Naba", "Skinimarinki" and "Nadando Com o Teddy". This album reached the 3rd position among the best sold in Brazil in 2003, and 18th in the list of best selling DVDs in Brazil in 2003, according to the Associação Brasileira de Produtores de Discos (ABPD).

== Track listing ==
Xuxa só para Baixinhos 4 – CD edition
No.	Title	Writer(s)	Length
1.	"Dirigindo Meu Carro" (Driving in my Car)	Ralph Covert; Version: Vanessa Alves	1:39
2.	"Hula-Hula da Xuxinha" (Dance The Ooby Doo)	The Wiggles (M Cook, J Fatt, A Field and G Page) and J Field; Version: Vanessa Alves	1:48
3.	"Surfar" (Do The Flap)	The Wiggles (M Cook, J Fatt, A Field and G Page), J Field and T Henry; Version: Vanessa Alves	1:39
4.	"Nadando Com o Teddy" (Swim Henry Swim)	The Wiggles (M Cook, J Fatt, A Field and G Page); Version: Vanessa Alves	1:57
5.	"Sr. Batedecábatedelá" (Mr. Knickerbocker))	D.P., arranged by David Bernard Wolf; Adaptation: Vanessa Alves and Xuxa	1:32
6.	"Ele é o Txutxucão" (Wags Loves to Shake Shake)	The Wiggles (M Cook, J Fatt, A Field and G Page) and J Field; Version: Vanessa Alves	2:19
7.	"Shake Com o pé" (Shake a Leg)	Norman Foote; Version: Vanessa Alves	1:36
8.	"Sem Parar" (Clap Your Hands)	D.P., arranged by Matt Huesmann; Adaptation: Vanessa Alves	1:57
9.	"Estátua"	Vanessa Alves; Ary Sperling	1:46
10.	"Toque o Dedo" (If You're Happy and You Know It)	D.P., arranged by Cal Scott; Adaptation: Vanessa Alves	1:11
11.	"Cinco na Cama" (Five In The Bed)	D.P., arranged by Cal Scott; Adaptation: Vanessa Alves	1:11
12.	"Roda Roda" (Ring Around The Rosie)	D.P., arranged by Cal Scott; Adaptation: Vanessa Alves	1:13
13.	"Se..." (If All The Raindrops)	D.P., arranged by Bob Singleton; Arrangement and Adaptation: Vanessa Alves	1:34
14.	"Dedo Das Mãos, Dedo Dos Pés" (Finger and Toes)	Gary Driskell; Ron Kingery; Stephen Elkins; Arrangement and Adaptation: Vanessa Alves	1:36
15.	"Skinimarinki"	D.P., arranged by Matt Huesmann; Adaptation: Vanessa Alves and Xuxa	1:23
16.	"A História da Cabana" (Little Cabin in the Woods)	D.P., arranged by Matt Huesmann; Adaptation: Vanessa Alves and Xuxa	1:06
17.	"Linda Sereia"	Vanessa Alves; Maurício Gaetani	2:20
18.	"Taba Naba"	D.P., arranged by The Wiggles (M Cook, J Fatt, A Field and G Page) and Christine Anu with Dominic Lindsay	2:04
19.	"Porquinho" (This Little Pig)	D.P.; Arrangement and Adaptation: Vanessa Alves	0:42
20.	"Hora de Dormir" (Go to Bed, Sleepy Head)	Peter Lurye and Mitchell Kriegman; Version: Vanessa Alves and Xuxa	2:25
21.	"Aloha'Oe"	Queen Lili' Uokalani; Arrangement and Adaptation: Vanessa Alves	2:47
Total length:			37:34

Xuxa só para Baixinhos 4 – DVD and VHS editing
No.	Title	Writer(s)	Length
1.	"Introdução"		0:20
2.	"Dirigindo Meu Carro" (Driving in my Car)	Ralph Covert; Version: Vanessa Alves	1:39
3.	"Passage (Palm Trees)"		0:20
4.	"Estátua"	Vanessa Alves; Ary Sperling	1:50
5.	"Passage (Octopus)"		0:10
6.	"Nadando Com o Teddy" (Swim Henry Swim)	The Wiggles (M Cook, J Fatt, A Field and G Page); Version: Vanessa Alves	2:05
7.	"Passage (Vogais)"		0:20
8.	"Se..." (If All The Raindrops)	D.P., arranged by Bob Singleton; Adaptation: Vanessa Alves	2:14
9.	"Passage (How Many Fingers Do We Have?)"		0:27
10.	"Dedo Das Mãos, Dedo Dos Pés" (Finger and Toes)	Gary Driskell; Ron Kingery; Stephen Elkins; Arrangement and Adaptation: Vanessa Alves	1:36
11.	"Toque o Dedo" (If You're Happy and You Know It)	D.P., arranged by Cal Scott; Adaptation: Vanessa Alves	1:14
12.	"Passage (Waves)"		0:14
13.	"Surfar" (Do The Flap)	The Wiggles (M Cook, J Fatt, A Field and G Page), J Field and T Henry; Version: Vanessa Alves	1:39
14.	"Ele é o Txutxucão" (Wags Loves to Shake Shake)	The Wiggles (M Cook, J Fatt, A Field and G Page) and J Field; Version: Vanessa Alves	2:19
15.	"Passage (Introduction of "Cinco na Cama")"		0:10
16.	"Cinco na Cama" (Five In The Bed)	D.P., arranged by Cal Scott; Adaptation: Vanessa Alves	1:13
17.	"Passage (Horse)"		0:13
18.	"Sem Parar" (Clap Your Hands)	D.P., arranged by Matt Huesmann; Arrangement and Adaptation: Vanessa Alves	1:58
19.	"Sr. Batedecábatedelá" (Mr. Knickerbocker)	D.P., arranged by David Bernard Wolf; Adaptation: Vanessa Alves and Xuxa	2:09
20.	"Passage (Vowels in Signs)"		0:20
21.	"Shake Com o pé" (Shake a Leg)	Norman Foote; Version: Vanessa Alves	1:37
22.	"A História da Cabana" (Little Cabin in the Woods)	D.P., arranged by Matt Huesmann; Adaptation: Vanessa Alves and Xuxa	1:11
23.	"Skinimarinki"	D.P., arranged by Matt Huesmann; Adaptation: Vanessa Alves and Xuxa	1:29
24.	"Hula-Hula da Xuxinha" (Dance The Ooby Doo)	The Wiggles (M Cook, J Fatt, A Field and G Page) and J Field; Version: Vanessa Alves	2:58
25.	"Passage (Introduction of "Linda Sereia")"		0:18
26.	"Linda Sereia"	Vanessa Alves; Maurício Gaetani	2:20
27.	"Passage (Vowels in the Sand)"		0:21
28.	"Taba Naba"	D.P., arranged by The Wiggles (M Cook, J Fatt, A Field and G Page) and Christine Anu with Dominic Lindsay	2:09
29.	"Porquinho" (This Little Pig)	D.P.; Arrangement and Adaptation: Vanessa Alves	0:47
30.	"Hora de Dormir" (Go to Bed, Sleepy Head)	Peter Lurye and Mitchell Kriegman; Version: Vanessa Alves and Xuxa	2:28
31.	"Aloha'Oe" (Credits)	Queen Lili' Uokalani; Arrangement and Adaptation: Vanessa Alves	4:05
Total length:			51:21

== Personnel ==
- General and Artistic Direction: Xuxa Meneghel
- Executive production: Luiz Cláudio Moreira and Mônica Muniz
- Musical production: Ary Sperling
- Musical Coordination: Vanessa Alves (Vavá)
- Recording Engineers: Val Andrade (Valvulado)
- Mixing Engineers: Guilherme Reis
- Version: Vanessa Alves (Vavá)
- Production: Xuxa Produções and Som Livre
- Direction: Blad Meneghel
- Director of photography: Luiz Leal (Luizinho)
- Production director: Junior Porto
- Production Coordination: Ana Paula Guimarães (Catu)
- Production assistant: Andrezza Cruz
- Cameraman: Osvaldo Rogério (Gaúcho)

== Certifications ==
Certifications for "Xuxa só para Baixinhos 4 – Praia"
Region	Certification	Certified units/sales
Brazil (Pro-Música Brasil)	Platinum	250,000^{‡}
^{‡} Sales+streaming figures based on certification alone.
