= El Mundo Es de los Dos =

Studio album by Xuxa
- Released: June 22, 1999
- Recorded: 1998–1999
- Genre: Dance-pop
- Length: 38:09
- Label: Polygram; Mercury
- Producer: Francesc Pellicer

Xuxa chronology
Xuxa Dance (1996)	El Mundo Es de los Dos (1999)	Solamente para Bajitos (2005)

Singles from El Mundo Es de los Dos
- 1. "El Mundo Es De Los Dos" Released: 1999; 2. "Besamé Poquito" Released: 1999

El Mundo Es de los Dos (English: The World Is Of The Two) is the sixth studio album in the Spanish language album by Brazilian recording artist Xuxa. It was released on June 22, 1999, by PolyGram.

== Production ==
The album was produced by Francesc Pellicer and co-produced by Elio de Mallorca and Richard Roman. Graphic design is to Carmo Valerio. It was recorded at Studios Code. El Mundo és de los Dos the last work directed to the Hispanic teenage public of the singer. The lyrics of the songs present a more mature Xuxa, but without losing the youthful touch that characterizes it. She would only record another international album six years later, when she released Solamente para Bajitos (2005), the only Só Para Baixinhos recorded in Spanish language. This album closed the adolescent stage of Xuxa abroad. It was the last album of the presenter in the language to be released in cassette format.

== Release ==
It was released on June 22, 1999, in Argentina, then in the United States and Mexico. El Mundo és de los Dos became the last work directed to the Hispanic teenage audience the singer.

== Promotion ==
In Mexico, Xuxa was invited by Televisa network to perform at the "Festival Acapulco Milenio", released his album.

== Track list ==
El Mundo és de los Dos — Standard edition
No.	Title	Writer(s)	Producer (es)	Length
1.	"Besamé Poquito"	Richard Roman; Luis Gómez-Escolar	Francesc Pellicer	3:34
2.	"Convecente"	Richard Roman	Francesc Pellicer	3:41
3.	"Loca Por ti"	Richard Roman; Andrés del Val; Oscar de Palma	Francesc Pellicer	3:53
4.	"El Mundo es de Los Dos"	Richard Roman; Andrés del Val; Oscar de Palma	Francesc Pellicer	3:37
5.	"Dejame Bailar"	Richard Roman; Oscar de Palma; Andrés del Val	Francesc Pellicer	3:26
6.	"Dictador"	Richard Roman; Luis Gómez-Escolar	Francesc Pellicer	4:12
7.	"Mi Niña Bonita"	Richard Roman	Francesc Pellicer	3:24
8.	"La Puerta del Corazón"	Richard Roman; Andrés del Val	Francesc Pellicer	4:06
9.	"Libre"	Elio de Palma; Oscar de Palma	Francesc Pellicer	3:52
10.	"El Mundo es de Los Dos" (Remix)	Elio de Palma; Andrés del Val; Oscar de Palma	Francesc Pellicer	3:35
Total length:				38:09

== Personnel ==
- Photos: André Schilliró
- Stylist: Willis Ribeiro
- Makeup Department: Roberto Fernandes
- Chorus: Susana Ribalta and Elio de Palma
- Co-production: Elio de Palma, Richard Roman
- Mastering: Jesus N. Gómez, on the CD Master
- Production: Francesc Pellicer
- Graphic design: Valério do Carmo
- Direction of vocals and backing vocals: Graciela Carballo
- Musical arrangements and programming: Elio de Palma (except "Mi niña bonita" by Marco Rasa)
- Vocals recorded on: AR Stúdios
- Voice recording engineer: Marcelo Saboia
- Voice Recording Assistant: Doubt
- Recorded and mixed on: Code Studios
- Recording Engineers: Elio de Palma, Santi Maspons and Mard Martin

== Release history ==
Region	Date	Label	Format
Argentina	1999	CD; K7	Polygram (Universal Music); Mercury
EUA	1999	CD	Polygram (Universal Music); Mercury
