= It's a Wiggly Wiggly World =

2000 album/video by The Wiggles

Studio album by the Wiggles
- Released: 16 March 2000
- Recorded: 1999–2000
- Studios: Albert Studios, Sydney, Australia
- Genre: Children's music
- Length: 42:00
- Labels: ABC (AUS); HIT Entertainment (US & UK); Koch (US)
- Producer: The Wiggles

The Wiggles chronology
Toot Toot! (1998)	It's a Wiggly Wiggly World (2000)	Wiggle Time! (2000)

It's a Wiggly Wiggly World is the tenth album by Australian band The Wiggles, released in 2000 by ABC Music distributed by EMI. It was nominated for the 2000 ARIA Music Award for Best Children's Album but lost to Hi-5's Jump and Jive with Hi-5.

== Track listing ==
All tracks are written by Murray Cook, Jeff Fatt, Anthony Field, Greg Page except spoken and listed below.

No.	Title	Writer(s)	Length
1.	"In the Wiggles' World"	Cook, Fatt, Field, Page, John Field	1:11
2.	"Here Come the Wiggles"	Cook, Fatt, Field, Page, Dominic Lindsay	2:54
3.	"In the Big Red Car We Like To Ride"		1:48
4.	"Let's Meet Slim Dusty" (spoken intro)		0:17
5.	"I Love To Have A Dance With Dorothy" (featuring Slim Dusty)	Pat Alexander	2:32
6.	"Let's Meet Christine Anu" (spoken intro)		0:27
7.	"Taba Naba" (featuring Christine Anu)	Trad	1:53
8.	"Let's Meet Rolf Harris (Note: "Tie Me Kangaroo Down, Sport" and its introduction were removed from digital download in July 2014 after Rolf Harris was convicted of indecent assault.)" (spoken intro)		0:29
9.	"Tie Me Kangaroo Down, Sport" (featuring Rolf Harris)	Rolf Harris	1:38
10.	"Let's Meet Kamahl" (spoken intro)		0:15
11.	"Sing With Me" (featuring Kamahl)	Johnny Edward, Susan Edward	2:17
12.	"Let's Meet Human Nature" (spoken intro)		0:44
13.	"One Little Coyote" (featuring Human Nature)	Douglas B. Green	4:57
14.	"Hey, Hey, Hey We're All Pirate Dancing"	Cook, Fatt, Field, Page, John Field	2:38
15.	"Another Cuppa"	Edward, Susan Edward	2:47
16.	"Let's Meet Tim Finn" (spoken intro)		0:23
17.	"Six Months in a Leaky Boat (Wiggly Version)" (featuring Tim Finn)	Tim Finn	2:50
18.	"Blow Me Down"	John Field, Greg Truman	2:00
19.	"Let's Go (We're Riding in the Big Red Car)"	Cook, Fatt, Field, Page, John Field	2:09
20.	"Porcupine Pie"	Neil Diamond	1:49
21.	"Let's Meet Jimmy Little" (spoken intro)		0:32
22.	"Morningtown Ride" (featuring Jimmy Little)	Malvina Reynolds	2:29
23.	"Intro To Haru Ga Kita" (spoken)		0:55
24.	"Haru Ga Kita" (featuring Atsuko Arai)	Trad	1:20

== Personnel ==
The Wiggles

- Murray Cook – guitar, bass, backing vocals
- Jeff Fatt – backing vocals
- Anthony Field – backing vocals
- Greg Page – lead and backing vocals

Additional musicians

- Terry Murray – guitar
- John O'Grady – double bass
- Tony Henry – drums
- Maria Schattovits – violin
- Margaret Lindsay – cello
- Dominic Lindsay – trumpet
- Mark Punch – backing vocals
- Rick Price – backing vocals
- Paul Field – backing vocals
- Paul Paddick – backing vocals

== Charts ==
Chart performance for It's a Wiggly Wiggly World
Chart (2000)	Peak position
Australian Albums (ARIA)	39

== Certifications ==
Certifications for It's a Wiggly Wiggly World
Region	Certification	Certified units/sales
Australia (ARIA)	Gold	35,000^{^}
^{^} Shipments figures based on certification alone.

== Video ==
It's a Wiggly Wiggly World
- Directed by: Chisholm McTavish
- Produced by: Paul Field
- Starring: Greg Page; Anthony Field; Murray Cook; Jeff Fatt; Paul Paddick; Christine Anu; Kamahl; Rolf Harris; Slim Dusty; Jimmy Little; Tim Finn; Atsuko Arai
- Music by: The Wiggles
- Distributed by: Roadshow/ABC Video
- Release date: 25 July 2000
- Country: Australia

It's a Wiggly Wiggly World is a video released by Australian children's band the Wiggles in July 2000.

=== Song list ===
1. "In the Wiggles World"
2. "Here Comes the Wiggles"
3. "In the Big Red Car We Like To Ride"
4. "I Love To Have A Dance With Dorothy (featuring Slim Dusty)"
5. "Taba Naba (featuring Christine Anu)"
6. "Tie Me Kangaroo Down, Sport (featuring Rolf Harris)"
7. "Sing With Me (featuring Kamahl)"
8. "Hey Hey Hey We're all Pirate Dancing"
9. "Another Cuppa"
10. "Starry Night"
11. "Six Months in a Leaky Boat (featuring Tim Finn)"
12. "One Little Coyote"
13. "Blow Me Down"
14. "Let's Go (We're Riding in the Big Red Car)"
15. "Morningtown Ride (featuring Jimmy Little)"
16. "Haru Ga Kita (featuring Atsuko Arai)"

=== Releases ===
==== VHS ====
- Australia: 25 July 2000
- United States: 22 January 2002

==== DVD ====
- United States: 26 April 2005
- Australia: 14 June 2005
- United Kingdom: 12 September 2005

==== Other ====
In 2020, the video was released in multiple segments on their YouTube channel. The sections pertaining to Rolf Harris were removed.

=== Cast ===
The Wiggles

- Murray Cook
- Jeff Fatt
- Anthony Field
- Greg Page

Cast

- Leeanne Ashley as Dorothy the Dinosaur
- Paul Paddick as Captain Feathersword
- Cameron Lewis as Wags the Dog
- Reem Hanwell as Henry the Octopus
- Leanne Halloran as Officer Beaples
