= Storey pole =

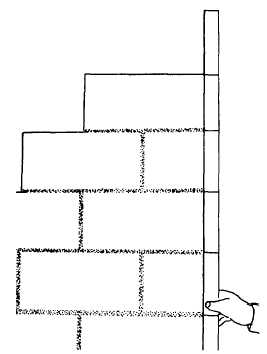
Storey pole used in masonry

A storey pole (or story pole, storey rod, story stick, jury stick, scantling, scantillon) is a length of narrow board usually cut to the height of one storey. It is used as a layout tool for any kind of repeated work in carpentry including stair-building, framing, timber framing, siding, brickwork, and setting tiles. The pole is marked for the heights from (usually) the floor platform of a building for dimensions such as window sill heights, window top heights (or headers), exterior door heights (or headers), interior door heights, wall gas jet heights (for gas lamps) and the level of the next storey joists. It makes for quick, repeatable measurements without the need of otherwise calibrated measuring devices or workers skilled in using them.

Craftsmen use them to mark clapboard and brick courses so that, for example, a course ends neatly below a window sill or at a door's architrave. They are used in remodelling so that, for example, the new coursing of exterior siding on a wing will match the existing.

There is evidence of 'boning-rods' being used in building Egypt's Great Pyramid as counterparts of modern storey poles.
