= Nabaa =

Nabaa may refer to:

== Places ==
- Naba'a, a densely populated suburb in the municipality of Bourj Hammoud, in Matn District, Lebanon
- Ras el-Nabaa, a sector in the city of Beirut, Lebanon
- Nabaa Al Safa, village in Aley District, Lebanon

== Persons ==
- Naba'a, a powerful leader of Gonja people in the 1600s and its kingdom in northern Ghana
- Nazir Nabaa (born 1938), Syrian painter

== See also ==
- Naba (disambiguation)
