= Termite shield =

Fabrication to reduce termite movement

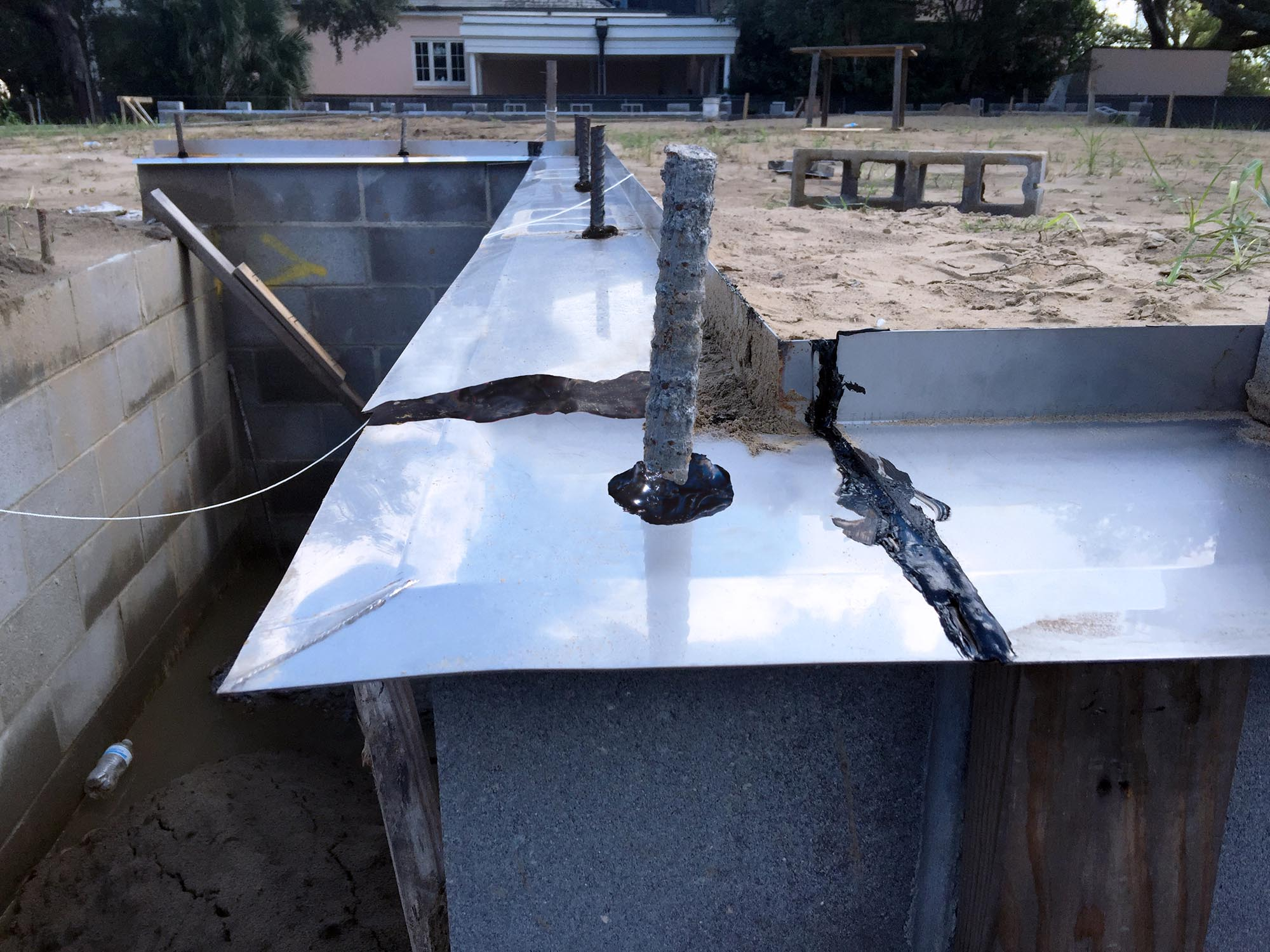
Metaire Louisiana construction using termite shield with termite barrier sealant at penetrations, seams, and underneath.

A termite shield is a sheet metal fabrication used in light frame construction to reduce the movement of termites from the soil into wood framing members such as floor joists and studs. Although there are several types of non chemical termite barriers now in use, termite shields are the original.

== Materials ==
Termite shields can be made up of various materials. One type of termite shield is made from various sheet metals including galvanized steel, terne, copper, or aluminum. The metal is formed to fit between the top of the foundation wall and the bottom of the wood sill plate. The edges of the termite shield are typically hemmed, extended slightly beyond the face of the wall, and turned down to form a drip edge which diverts water running down the face of the wall and reduce the movement of subterranean termites from the soil up into the wood framing members. Termite shields will not protect a building from termite activity, but help make termite activity more visible.

Lately, granite and Polyvinyl chloride (PVC) shield can be installed into tiny brick open spaces where termites can enter the building surrounding the whole perimeter of the property. The termite shield is too thick for the termites to chew and penetrate the material forcing the termites to migrate into the open where they can be more easily eradicated. The benefits of using this type of material is that they are sustainable to the environment being awarded Environmental Choice Declaration from the Environmental Labelling Association. Other benefits include being cheaper than metals, and can be coupled with other shield protection systems.

== Problems ==
One problem with termite shields is the gaps which exist at seams and at openings where steel reinforcing bars penetrate the metal shield. Since many species of subterranean termites can enter through openings >1/20 Inch (1.27 mm), these gaps must be sealed with a sealant known to block termites. Additionally, termite barrier sealant should be used underneath the shield, so termites are forced to go to the exterior of the structures.

== Other materials ==
There are two other materials called "termite barriers" rather than "termite shields" which have been evaluated by the International Code Council. One is a waterproofing membrane with non-chemical termite barrier sealant, and the other is a wire mesh. (See Termite barriers)
