= Xuxa só para Baixinhos 5 – Circo =

Circo

Studio album by Xuxa
- Released: 26 September 2004
- Recorded: 2004
- Genre: Children's music
- Length: 53:44
- Label: Som Livre
- Producer: Zé Henrique

Xuxa chronology
Só para Baixinhos Vol. 4 (2003)	Circo (2004)	Solamente para Bajitos (2005)

Singles from Xuxa só Para Baixinhos 5
- 1. "O Circo Já Chegou" Released: 2004; 2. "Piruetas" Released: 2004; 3. "Soco, Bate, Vira" Released: 2004

Xuxa só para Baixinhos 5 or Xuxa Circo (also known as XSPB 5) (transl. Only for Children Five – Circus) is the twenty-seventh studio album by Brazilian recording artist Xuxa, released on 26 September 2004 by Som Livre as the fifth album in the Só Para Baixinhos collection.

== Release and reception ==
Xuxa só para Baixinhos 5, was released on 26 September 2004, first in the version CD, cassette and VHS and released in DVD in November 2004, it was remastered and released in CD in 2008 in economic version. This album was one of the biggest hits of the series Xuxa só para Baixinhos. It reached the 8th position in the ranking of the most sold CDs and the 5th place among the DVDs, according to the Associação Brasileira dos Produtores de Discos. The album sold over 100,000 copies on DVD, yielding diamond certification. The singles were "Soco, Bate, Vira", "O Circo já Chegou" and "Piruetas".

The success of the Xuxa Circo, led to the launch of a tour that traveled Brazil and later released on DVD live.

== Track listing ==
Xuxa só para Baixinhos 5 – CD and cassette edition
No.	Title	Writer(s)	Length
1.	"O Circo já Chegou"	Ary Sperling; Vanessa Alves; Maurício Gaetani	1:38
2.	"Há, Há, Há" (Laugh With Me!)	David Bernard Wolf; Version: Vanessa Alves	1:48
3.	"Subindo, Descendo, Pirando" (Get Up, Get Down, Go Crazy)	Glenn Bennett; Version: Vanessa Alves	2:32
4.	"Mexe, Mexe" (Wiggle Song)	J Levine; Version: Vanessa Alves and Xuxa	1:32
5.	"Pra Frente, Pra Trás" (Jump Forward, Jump Back)	Chris Harriott and Sarah Boot; Version: Vanessa Alves	1:57
6.	"O Jogo das Palmas" (The Clapping Song)	Philip A Parker; Version: Vanessa Alves	2:14
7.	"Teddy Rock" (The Body Rock)	Greg Scelsa; Version: Vanessa Alves	2:34
8.	"Txu Txutxucão"	Vanessa Alves; Ary Sperling; João Andrade	1:59
9.	"A Elefanta Bila Bilú" (Wiggerly Woo)	M Cochrane and Don Spencer; Version: Vanessa Alves	1:38
10.	"O Palhacinho Atrapalhado"	Vanessa Alves; Ary Sperling; Rogério Meanda	2:08
11.	"Soco, Bate, Vira"	Vanessa Alves; Ary Sperling	1:49
12.	"Pot-Pourri: Ta-Ra-Ra-Bum-Di-Ei / Trés Ratinhos / O Grande Rei" (Ta-Ra-Ra-Boom-De-Ay), (Three Blind Mice) and (The Grand Old Duke Of York)	Traditional - Arrangement and Adaptation: Vanessa Alves	1:42
13.	"Pot-Pourri: Quem Pegou o Biscoito / Tic Tic Tac / Elefante Trombinha" (Who Stole The Cookies?), (Hickory, Dickory, Dock) and (Elefante Trompita)	Traditional - Arrangement and Adaptation: Vanessa Alves in "Quem Pegou o Biscoito?" e "Tic Tic Tac", Juan Alberto Ficchia; Version: Vanessa Alves in "Elefante Trombinha"	1:15
14.	"Pot-Pourri: A Chaleira / A Ram Sam Sam / Juca e Mel" (I'm A Little Teapot), (A Ram Sam Sam) and (Two Little Blackbirds)	Traditional - Arrangement and Adaptation: Vanessa Alves and Xuxa Meneghel	1:33
15.	"Eu Passo o Tênis" (Pass The Shoe)	Joe Francis; Version: Vanessa Alves and Xuxa Meneghel	1:29
16.	"Bichos" (So Many Animals)	Chris Harriott and Andrew Einspruch; Version: Vanessa Alves	1:36
17.	"Piruetas" (featuring Renato Aragão)	Sergio Bardotti, Luis Enriquez Bacalov and Chico Buarque; Arrangement: Xuxa	2:22
18.	"Um Lindo Arco-Íris" (The Rainbow Song)	Philip A Parker; Version: Vanessa Alves	1:25
19.	"Nosso Rosto" (One Fine Face)	Jeff Moss; Version: Vanessa Alves	2:09
20.	"É Hora do Banho" (Bathtime)	Raffi; Version: Vanessa Alves	2:06
21.	"Alguém" (Hold On), (sung by Sasha Meneghel Szafir)	Dave Cook and Judy Mackenzie-dunn; Version: Vanessa Alves	1:49
22.	"O Mágico Mundo dos Cavalinhos" (The Wonderful Dreamland Merry-go-Round)	David and Susan Jack; Version: Vanessa Alves	2:17
Total length:			40:20

Xuxa só para Baixinhos 5 – DVD and VHS edition
No.	Title	Writer(s)	Length
1.	"Intro"		1:25
2.	"O Circo já Chegou"	Ary Sperling; Vanessa Alves; Maurício Gaetani	1:38
3.	"Passage (Numbers)"		0:21
4.	"Bichos" (So Many Animals)	Chris Harriott and Andrew Einspruch; Version: Vanessa Alves	1:36
5.	"Três Ratinhos" (Three Blind Mice)	Traditional - Arrangement and Adaptation: Vanessa Alves	0:27
6.	"Há, Há, Há" (Laugh With Me!)	David Bernard Wolf; Version: Vanessa Alves	1:48
7.	"O Grande Rei" (The Grand Old Duke Of York)	Traditional - Arrangement and Adaptation: Vanessa Alves	0:28
8.	"Subindo, Descendo, Pirando" (Get Up, Get Down, Go Crazy)	Glenn Bennett; Version: Vanessa Alves	2:32
9.	"Passage (Rabbit and Clown: Zebra's Joke)"		0:30
10.	"Mexe, Mexe" (Wiggle Song)	J Levine; Version: Vanessa Alves and Xuxa	1:32
11.	"Passage (Dream of Txutxucão)"	J. Field	1:11
12.	"Txu Txutxucão"	Vanessa Alves; Ary Sperling; João Andrade	2:08
13.	"Passage (Drawing of Ice cream)"		0:14
14.	"Pra Frente, Pra Trás" (Jump Forward, Jump Back)	Chris Harriott and Sarah Boot; Version: Vanessa Alves	2:00
15.	"Tic Tic Tac" (Hickory, Dickory, Dock)	Traditional - Arrangement and Adaptation: Vanessa Alves	0:18
16.	"O Jogo das Palmas" (The Clapping Song)	Philip A Parker; Version: Vanessa Alves	2:16
17.	"Teddy Rock" (The Body Rock)	Greg Scelsa; Version: Vanessa Alves	3:01
18.	"A Ram Sam Sam"	Traditional - Arrangement and Adaptation: Vanessa Alves and Xuxa Meneghel	0:41
19.	"Soco, Bate, Vira"	Vanessa Alves; Ary Sperling	1:49
20.	"Passage (Clown singing Ta-Ra-Ra-Bum-Di-Ei)"		1:25
21.	"Ta-Ra-Ra-Bum-Di-Ei" (Ta-Ra-Ra-Boom-De-Ay)	Traditional - Arrangement and Adaptation: Vanessa Alves	0:57
22.	"Elefante Trombinha" (Elefante Trompita)	Juan Alberto Ficchia; Version: Vanessa Alves	0:33
23.	"A Elefanta Bila Bilú" (Wiggerly Woo)	M Cochrane and Don Spencer; Version: Vanessa Alves	1:40
24.	"Passagem (Rabbit and Clown: Elephant Joke)"	Vanessa Alves; Ary Sperling; Rogério Meanda	0:20
25.	"Quem Pegou o Biscoito" (Who Stole The Cookies?)	Traditional - Arrangement and Adaptation: Vanessa Alves	1:01
26.	"Um Lindo Arco-Íris" (The Rainbow Song)	Philip A Parker; Version: Vanessa Alves	1:27
27.	"Passage (Clown Puppets go Marching)"		0:27
28.	"Nosso Rosto" (One Fine Face)	Jeff Moss; Version: Vanessa Alves	2:10
29.	"Passage (Drawing of Popcorn)"		0:18
30.	"Eu Passo o Tênis" (Pass The Shoe)	Joe Francis; Version: Vanessa Alves and Xuxa Meneghel	0:56
31.	"Passage (Bunny)"		0:16
32.	"O Palhacinho Atrapalhado"	Vanessa Alves; Ary Sperling; Rogério Meanda	2:15
33.	"Passage (Disturb)"		0:23
34.	"Piruetas" (featuring Renato Aragão)	Sergio Bardotti, Luis Enriquez Bacalov and Chico Buarque; Arrangement: Xuxa	2:56
35.	"Sou Uma Chaleira" (I'm A Little Teapot)	Traditional - Arrangement and Adaptation: Vanessa Alves and Xuxa Meneghel	0:20
36.	"É Hora do Banho" (Bathtime)	Raffi; Version: Vanessa Alves	2:11
37.	"Juca e Mel" (Two Little Blackbirds)	Traditional - Arrangement and Adaptation: Vanessa Alves	0:38
38.	"Alguém" (Hold On), (sung by Sasha Meneghel Szafir)	Dave Cook and Judy Mackenzie-dunn; Version: Vanessa Alves	1:50
39.	"O Mágico Mundo dos Cavalinhos" (The Wonderful Dreamland Merry-go-Round)	David and Susan Jack; Version: Vanessa Alves	2:17
40.	"Credits" ("O Trapezista" (Instrumental) and "Alguém" (sung by Sasha Meneghel Szafir, Maria Mariana and Luma Antunes)		3:43
Total length:			51:38

== Personnel ==
- Art Direction: Xuxa Meneghel
- Production: Ary Sperling
- Vocal Preparation (Xuxa): Ângela de Castro
- Mixing: Discover Studio (Rio de Janeiro, Brasil)
- Recording Engineers: Val Andrade e Ary Sperling
- Mastering Engineer: Evren Goknar
- Mastering: Capitol Mastering (Los Angeles, USA)
- Musical Coordination: Vanessa Alves
- Recorded in studio: Viva Voz (Rio de Janeiro, Brasil)
- Production Engineer: Guilherme Reis, Arranjos, Regência
- Voices guide to Xuxa: Vanessa Alves
- Guiding Voice (Music "Alguém"): Ana Cecília Calderón
- Special participation (Music "Piruetas"): Renato Aragão

== Certifications ==
Region	Certification	Certified units/sales
Brazil (Pro-Música Brasil) DVD	Diamond	100,000^{*}
Brazil (Pro-Música Brasil) CD	Platinum	125,000^{*}
Brazil (Pro-Música Brasil)	2× Platinum	250,000^{‡}
^{*} Sales figures based on certification alone.^{‡} Sales+streaming figures based on certification alone.
