= Nabas =

Nabas may refer to:

- Nabas, Aklan, a municipality in the Philippines
- Nabas, Pyrénées-Atlantiques, a commune in southwestern France
- NABAS (National Association of Balloon Artists & Suppliers), an independent national trade association for the UK balloon industry

== See also ==
- Naba (disambiguation)
