= Solamente para Bajitos =

Studio album by Xuxa
- Released: February 12, 2005
- Recorded: 2004
- Genre: Children's music
- Length: 51:12
- Label: Sony BMG
- Producers: Mônica Muniz; Luiz Banda Fernandes

Xuxa chronology
| Xuxa só para Baixinhos 5 – Circo (2004) | Solamente para Bajitos (2005) | Xuxa só para Baixinhos 6 – Festa (2005) |

Solamente para Bajitos (English: Only For Children) is the twenty-eighth studio album and the seventh Spanish language album by Brazilian recording artist Xuxa Meneghel. It was released February 12, 2005 by Sony BMG. This album marks the return of Xuxa to her Hispanic audience, since El Mundo és de los Dos (1999). It includes Spanish-language versions of tracks from her audiovisual series Xuxa só para Baixinhos.

== Production ==
The album reunites re-recordings of the biggest hits of the first four albums of the series Xuxa só para Baixinhos. To perform only for Bajitos, there were seven months of production need. Two months only for recordings of songs per week during music videos recordings, two months to edit and three months to completion. In addition to a team of 80 professionals, including cast, technicians, video, audio, set designers, lighting and cameras. More than two tons of equipment were used in a 1,200 square meter studio.

== Release and reception ==
Solamente para Bajitos album reunites re-recordings of the biggest hits of the first four albums of the series Xuxa Só Para Baixinhos. To realize Solamente para Bajitos, there were seven months of need of production. Two months only for recordings of songs per week during recordings of music videos, two months to edit and three months to completion. In addition to a team of 80 professionals, including cast, video technicians, audio, set designers, lighting and cameras. More than two tons of equipment were used in a 1,200 square meter studio. The album was released in VHS, DVD, CD and also had a promotional version of the CD. To promote his new work, Xuxa went to Buenos Aires and made two presentations, in television programs La Noche del 10 hosted by Diego Maradona and Showmatch with Marcelo Tinelli. Curiously, the song El Trencito did not enter the CD version of "Só para Bajitos". Xuxa gained platinum certification by Argentine Chamber of Phonograms and Videograms Producers (CAPIF), after selling 40,000 copies in Argentina.

The first edition of Xuxa Só Para Baixinhos was released in 2001, winning not only the Brazilian market, but international recognition. The artist was appointed to three Latin Grammy for "Best Children's Album", winning in 2002 with Xuxa Só Para Baixinhos 2, and in 2003 with Xuxa Só Para Baixinhos 3.

== Track listing ==
Solamente para Bajitos – CD edition
| No. | Title | Writer(s) | Length |
|---|---|---|---|
| 1. | "Estatua" (Estátua) | Vanessa Alves; Ary Sperling; Version: Graciela Carballo | 1:46 |
| 2. | "Txutxucán" (Txu Txutxucão) | Vanessa Alves; Ary Sperling; João Andrade; Version: Graciela Carballo | 2:01 |
| 3. | "Baile Del Mono" (The Monkey Dance) | M. Cook; J. Fatt; A. Field; G. Page; J. Field; Version: Bárbara Noel Cudich | 1:49 |
| 4. | "Ven Que te Voy a Enseñar" (The Hokey Pokey) | D. P.; Version: Bárbara Noel Cudich | 2:35 |
| 5. | "Cinco Monitos" (Five Little Joeys) | D. P.; Version: Bárbara Noel Cudich | 1:40 |
| 6. | "Dos Pececitos" (Three Little Fishes) | D. P.; Version: Bárbara Noel Cudich and Graciella Carballo | 1:26 |
| 7. | "El Ómnibus" (The Wheels on the Bus) | D. P.; Version: Bárbara Noel Cudich | 1:30 |
| 8. | "Los Números / Cabeza, Hombro, Pierna y Pie" (John Bradlelum, Head, Shoulders and Knees and Toes) | J. Field; M. Cook; J. Fatt; A. Field; G. Page; Version: Bárbara Noel Cudich | 3:57 |
| 9. | "Mientras el Lobo no Está" (Juguemos en el Bosque) | Joe Mac Fuste; Oscar Banegas | 1:48 |
| 10. | "El Sapito Salió Para Pasear" (A Frog Went a Walking) | D. P.; Version: Bárbara Noel Cudich | 2:51 |
| 11. | "El Conejito Fufu" (Little Bunny Foo Foo) | D. P.; Version: Graciela Carballo | 3:03 |
| 12. | "Los Tres Corderitos" (Three Billy Goats Gruff) | Greg Scelsa; Mike Lewis; Version: Bárbara Noel Cudich; Graciela Carballo | 4:34 |
| 13. | "Dedo de Las Manos, Dedo de Los Pies" (Fingers and Toes) | D. P.; Version: Bárbara Noel Cudich | 1:37 |
| 14. | "Popurrí: El Sapo no se Lava el Pie / Oruga / Conejito" (O Sapo Não Lava o pé), (Minhoca) and (O Coelhinho) | D. P. - Arrangement and Adaptation: Xuxa in "El Sapo no se Lava el Pie" and "Oruga" and Duhilia Frazão Guimarães Madeira in "Conejito" - Version: Bárbara Noel Cudich | 2:26 |
| 15. | "Cinco Patitos" (Five Little Ducks) | M. Cook; J. Fatt; A. Field; G. Page; Version: Bárbara Noel Cudich | 2:07 |
| 16. | "La Muñequita" (A Bonequinha) | D. P.; Version: Xuxa | 2:25 |
| Total length: | | | 37:44 |

Xuxa só para Baixinhos 5 – DVD and VHS edition
| No. | Title | Writer(s) | Length |
|---|---|---|---|
| 1. | "Introduction" | | 1:25 |
| 2. | "Estatua" (Estátua) | Vanessa Alves; Ary Sperling; Version: Graciela Carballo | 1:46 |
| 3. | "Passage (Numbers)" | | 0:20 |
| 4. | "Ven Que te Voy a Enseñar" (The Hokey Pokey) | D. P.; Version: Bárbara Noel Cudich | 2:35 |
| 5. | "Passage (Rocky Dog)" | | 0:21 |
| 6. | "Txutxucán" (Txu Txutxucão) | Vanessa Alves; Ary Sperling; João Andrade; Version: Graciela Carballo | 2:01 |
| 7. | "Passage (Numbers)" | | 0:20 |
| 8. | "Dos Pececitos" (Three Little Fishes) | D. P.; Version: Bárbara Noel Cudich; Graciella Carballo | 1:26 |
| 9. | "Passage (Vowels)" | | 0:16 |
| 10. | "El Sapito Salió Para Pasear" (A Frog Went a Walking) | D. P.; Version: Bárbara Noel Cudich | 2:51 |
| 11. | "Popurrí: El Sapo no se Lava el Pie / Oruga / Conejito" (O Sapo Não Lava o Pé), (Minhoca) and (O Coelhinho) | D. P. - Arrangement and Adaptation: Xuxa in "El Sapo no se Lava el Pie" and "Oruga"; Duhilia Frazão Guimarães Madeira in "Conejito" - Version: Bárbara Noel Cudich | 2:26 |
| 12. | "No Maltrates el Gatito (Musical Passage)" (Não Atire o Pau no Gato-tô) | Version: Bárbara Noel Cudich | 0:35 |
| 13. | "El Conejito Fufu" (Little Bunny Foo Foo) | D. P.; Version: Graciela Carballo | 3:03 |
| 14. | "Passage (Vowels)" | | 0:20 |
| 15. | "Dedo de Las Manos, Dedo de Los Pies" (Fingers and Toes) | D. P.; Version: Bárbara Noel Cudich | 1:37 |
| 16. | "Passage (Numbers)" | | 0:20 |
| 17. | "Mientras el Lobo no Está" (Juguemos en el Bosque) | Joe Mac Fuste; Oscar Banegas | 1:48 |
| 18. | "Passage (Medical Dog)" | | 0:10 |
| 19. | "Cinco Monitos" (Five Little Joeys) | D. P.; Version: Bárbara Noel Cudich | 1:40 |
| 20. | "Passage (Drawing of Lambs)" | | 0:32 |
| 21. | "Los Tres Corderitos" (Three Billy Goats Gruff) | Greg Scelsa; Mike Lewis; Versão: Bárbara Noel Cudich; Graciela Carballo | 4:34 |
| 22. | "Passage (Numbers)" | | 0:28 |
| 23. | "Los Números / Cabeza, Hombro, Pierna y Pie" (John Bradlelum, Head, Shoulders and Knees and Toes) | J. Field; M. Cook; J. Fatt; A. Field; G. Page; Version: Bárbara Noel Cudich | 3:57 |
| 24. | "Passage (Numbers)" | | 0:28 |
| 25. | "Baile Del Mono" (The Monkey Dance) | M. Cook; J. Fatt; A. Field; G. Page; J. Field; Version: Bárbara Noel Cudich | 1:49 |
| 26. | "Passage (Numbers)" | | 0:28 |
| 27. | "El Ómnibus" (The Wheels on the Bus) | D. P.; Version: Bárbara Noel Cudich | 1:30 |
| 28. | "Passage (Numbers)" | | 0:28 |
| 29. | "El Trencito" (Pufferbillies) | G. Page; A. Field; M. Cook; J. Fatt; Version: Bárbara Noel Cudich | 1:19 |
| 30. | "Passage (Drawing of Ducklings)" | | 0:21 |
| 31. | "Cinco Patitos" (Five Little Ducks) | M. Cook; J. Fatt; A. Field; G. Page; Version: Bárbara Noel Cudich | 2:07 |
| 32. | "La Muñequita" (A Bonequinha) | D. P.; Version: Xuxa | 2:25 |
| 33. | "Credits" ("Estátua" / "El Sapito Salió Para Passear" / "Ven Que te Voy a Ensiñar" / "Txutxucán" (Instrumental) | | 3:20 |
| Total length: | | | 51:12 |

== Personnel ==
- Art Direction: Xuxa Meneghel
- General Direction: Xuxa Meneghel
- Produced: Luiz Banda Fernandes and Mônica Muniz
- Production Director: Junior Porto
- Direction of Special Effects: Jorge Banda Fernandes
- Production Coordination: Ana Paula Guimarães
- Music Production: Ary Sperling
- Directed by: Blad Meneghel
- Musical Coordination: Vanessa Alves
- Recording Engineer: Val Andrade
- General Supervision: Susana Piñar
- Vocal Preparation of Xuxa: Angela de Castro
- Cinematography by: Luiz Leal
- Set Design and Art Production: Lueli Antunes
- Production of Special Effects: André Lopes (Bokko)
- Technical Coordinator: Alfredo Campos
- Hair and Makeup: Angélica Gomes and Lau Viana
- Choreography: Vagner Meneses (Fly)
- Production Support: Eduardo Ramos
- Sonoplastia: Leonardo da Vinci (Mikimba)
- Edition: Paulo Campos and Isabella Raja Gaboglía
- Post Production: Otto Gama, Andrezza Cruzz and Carlos Waldek
