= National Air Barrier Association =

The National Air Barrier Association (NABA) began in the province of Manitoba. The Association includes a variety of stakeholders in the air barrier industry and was the first to utilize the Air Barrier Quality Assurance Program (QAP). While there is still an emphasis on Manitoba, projects have been specified NABA in Ontario, Saskatchewan, Alberta, and Nunavut. It is the goal of the association to see projects specified NABA in all regions of the country.
