= Taba Naba =

Children's song from the Torres Strait Islands

"Taba Naba" is a children's song originating in the Torres Strait Islands just north of the continent of Australia. This song is usually accompanied by a "sit-down dance" where the "dancers" perform traditional movements corresponding to the lyrics.

The song is a traditional song in Meriam Mir, a language of the Torres Strait Islanders.

== Lyrics ==
Taba naba naba norem,
Tugi penai siri, dinghy e naba we,
Miko keimi sere re naba we,
Taba naba norem.
(Style)

Translation:

Come on let's go to the reef,
Get into the dinghy when the morning tide is low,
Let us row to the edge of the reef,
Come on let's go to the reef.
(Style)

== Popular culture ==
Children’s band The Wiggles performed it with Australian pop singer and Eastern Torres Strait native Christine Anu on their 2000 album It's a Wiggly Wiggly World. On the related video Anu performed the sit-down dance to the song. The song would soon be featured again in two TV series (Lights, Camera, Action, Wiggles! and Ready, Steady, Wiggle!), Wiggle Town and Duets (with Christine Anu returning).

In Brazil, the Brazilian singer Xuxa recorded the song for her album Xuxa Só Para Baixinhos 4 (English: Xuxa only for kids 4)

== See also ==
- Torres Strait Islands
- The Wiggles
