= Air barrier =

Methods of controlling air leakage into and out of a building envelope

Air barriers control air leakage into and out of the building envelope. Air barrier products may take several forms:

- Mechanically-attached membranes, also known as housewraps, usually a polyethylene-fiber or spun-bonded polyolefin, such as Tyvek is a generally accepted moisture barrier and an air barrier (ASTM E2178).
- Self-adhered membranes, which are typically also a water-resistant barrier and a vapor barrier
- Fluid-applied membranes, such as heavy-bodied paints or coatings including polymeric based and asphaltic based materials
- Closed-cell medium density spray-applied polyurethane foam, which typically provides insulation as well
- Boardstock, which includes 12 mm plywood or OSB, 25 mm extruded polystyrene, etc.
- Some open-cell spray-applied polyurethane foam that are of high density

== Components ==
Air barriers are divided into air barrier materials, air barrier accessories, air barrier components, air barrier assemblies and air barrier systems.

Air barrier materials – Building materials that are designed and constructed to provide the principal plane of airtightness through an environmental separator, which has an air permeance rate no greater than 0.02 L/(s•m^{2}) at a pressure difference of 75 Pa when tested in accordance with ASTM E 2178. Air barrier materials meet the requirements of the CAN/ULC S741 Air Barrier Material Specification. The air barrier materials are typically the "big" pieces of material used in an air barrier assembly.

Air barrier accessories – Products designated to maintain air tightness between air barrier materials, assemblies and components, to fasten them to the structure of the building, or both (e.g., sealants, tapes, backer rods, transition membranes, nails/washers, ties, clips, staples, strapping, primers) and which has an air permeance rate no greater than 0.02 L/(s•m^{2}) at a pressure difference of 75 Pa when tested in accordance with ASTM E 2178. Air barrier components are used to connect and seal air barrier materials and/or air barrier assemblies together.

Air barrier components – Pre-manufactured elements such as windows, doors and service elements that are installed in the environmental separator and sealed by air barrier accessories and which have an air leakage rate no greater than 0.20 L/(s•m^{2}) at a pressure difference of 75 Pa when tested in accordance with ASTM E 2357.

Air barrier assemblies – Combinations of air barrier materials and air barrier accessories that are designated and designed within the environmental separator to act as a continuous barrier to the movement of air through the environmental separator and which has an air leakage rate no greater than 0.20 L/(s•m^{2}) at a pressure difference of 75 Pa when tested in accordance with ASTM E 2357.

Air barrier systems – Combinations of air barrier assemblies and air barrier components, connected by air barrier accessories, that are designed to provide a continuous barrier to the movement of air through an environmental separator, which has an air leakage rate no greater than 2.00 L/(s•m^{2}) at a pressure difference of 75 Pa when tested in accordance with ASTM E 779 or CAN/CGSB 149.10 or CAN/CGSB 149.15.

== Vapor barrier ==
Some air barriers may be water vapor permeable, while others perform the function of a vapor barrier. They may be vapor-permeable or non-permeable.

== See also ==
- National Air Barrier Association
