= Little Red Riding Hood =

European fairy tale

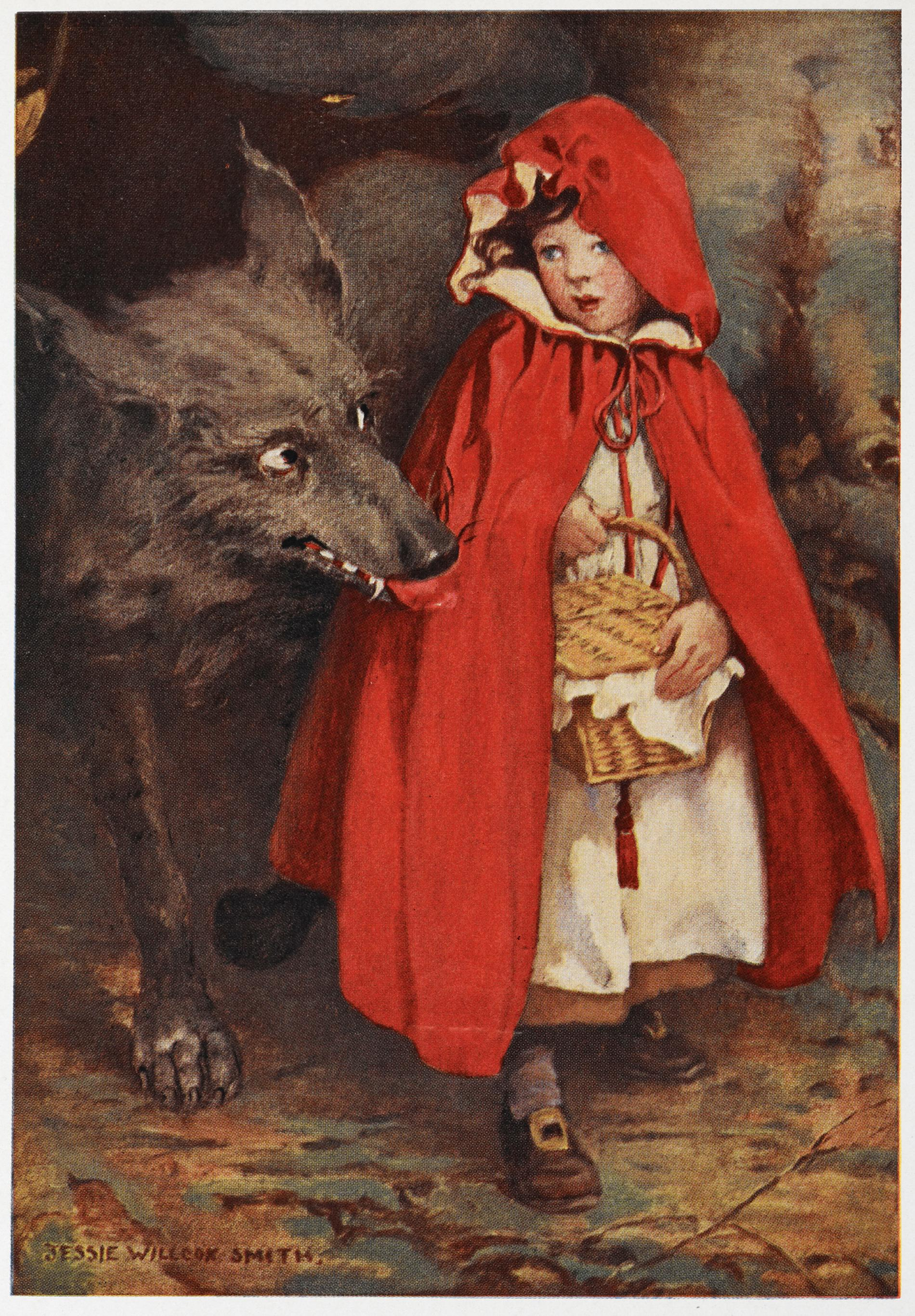
- Illustration by J. W. Smith

Folk tale
- Name: Little Red Riding Hood
- Aarne–Thompson grouping: 333
- Mythology: European
- Region: Western Europe
- Origin Date: 1697, 1812

Little Red Riding Hood
The version found in The Book of Fables and Folk Stories by Horace E. Scudder.

Little Red Riding Hood (French: Le Petit Chaperon rouge, German: Rotkäppchen, Italian: Cappuccetto Rosso) is a fairy tale about a young girl and a Big Bad Wolf. Some later versions include a woodsman. Its origins can be traced back to several pre-17th-century European folk tales (including in present-day France, Italy, and German-speaking regions), with parallels in ancient oral narratives and motifs; it was first recorded in literary form in French by Charles Perrault, and later retold in the 19th-century by the Brothers Grimm.

The story has varied considerably in different versions over the centuries, translations, and as the subject of numerous modern adaptations. Other names for the story are "Little Red Cap" or simply "Red Riding Hood". It is number 333 in the Aarne–Thompson classification system for folktales.

== Plot ==
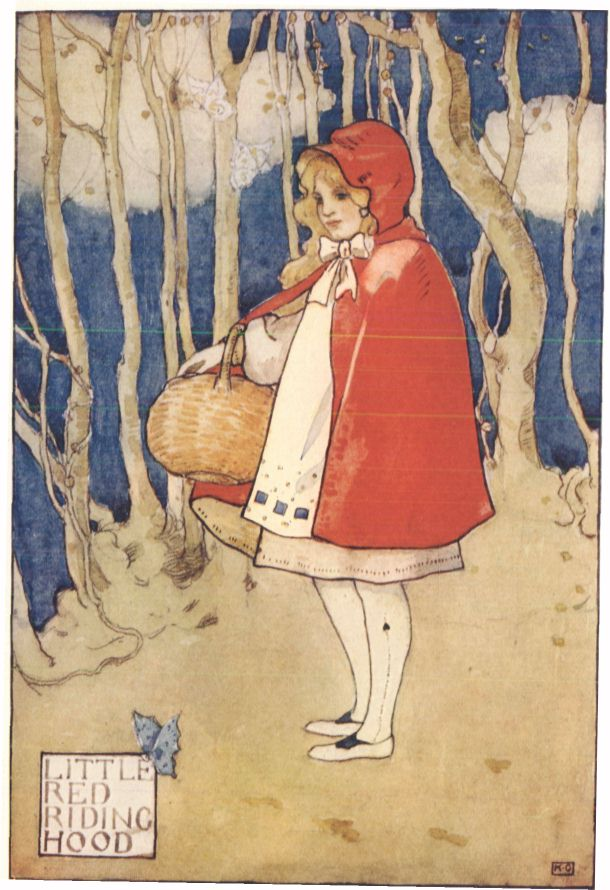
"Little Red Riding Hood" as illustrated in a 1927 story anthology

The story revolves around a girl named Little Red Riding Hood, named after the red hooded cape that she wears. The girl walks through the woods to deliver food to her sickly grandmother (wine and cake, depending on the translation).

A stalking wolf wants to eat the girl and the food in the basket. After he asks where she is going, he suggests that she pick some flowers as a present for her grandmother. While she goes in search of flowers, he goes to the grandmother's house and gains entry by pretending to be Riding Hood. He swallows the grandmother whole, climbs into her bed, and waits for the girl, disguised as the grandmother.

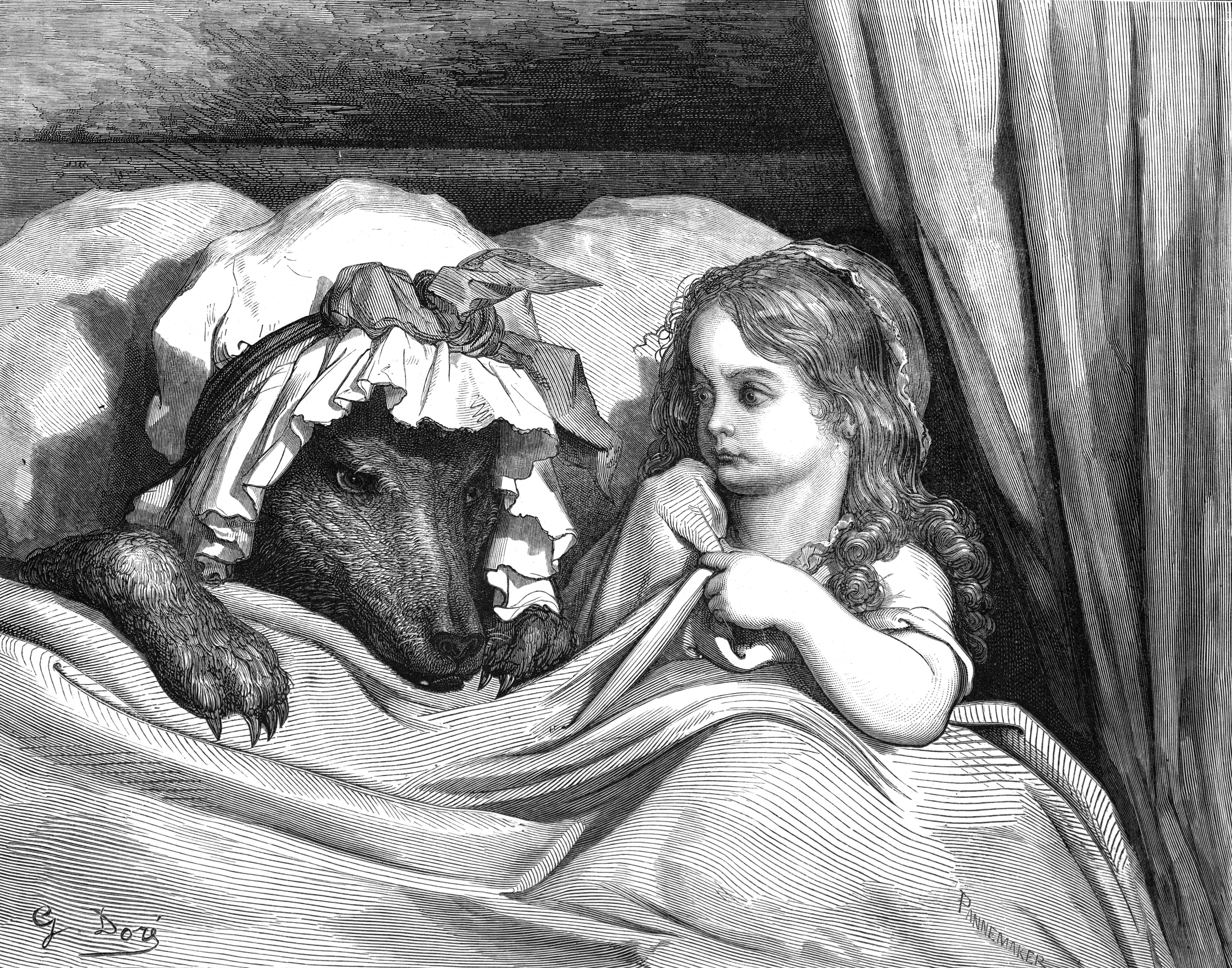
Gustave Doré's engraving of the scene "She was astonished to see how her grandmother looked."

When Riding Hood arrives, she notices the strange appearance of her "grandmother". After some back and forth, Riding Hood comments on the wolf's teeth, at which point the wolf leaps out of bed and eats her as well. In Charles Perrault's version of the story, the first to be published, the wolf falls asleep afterwards, whereupon the story ends.

In later versions, the story continues: A woodcutter (German: Jäger, lit. 'hunter') in the Brothers Grimm and traditional German versions comes to the rescue with an axe, and cuts open the sleeping wolf. Little Red Riding Hood and her grandmother emerge shaken, but unharmed. They then fill the wolf's body with heavy stones. The wolf awakens and attempts to flee, but the stones cause him to collapse and die. In the Grimms' version, the wolf leaves the house and tries to drink out of a well, but the stones in his stomach cause him to fall in and drown (similarly to the story of "The Wolf and the Seven Little Kids").

Sanitized versions of the story have the grandmother locked in the closet rather than being eaten (and also having the wolf eat the food Little Red Riding Hood brought rather than her) and some have Little Red Riding Hood saved by the lumberjack as the wolf advances on her rather than after she is eaten, where the woodcutter kills the wolf with his axe or simply chases away the wolf with his axe. The Brothers Grimm version had the woodcutter's rescue of Little Red Riding Hood replaced with a hunter who did the job.

== History ==
=== Relationship to other tales ===
Illustration by John Hassall (1898)

The story displays similarities to stories from classical Greece and Rome. It resembles a legend recounted by Pausanias in which, each year, a virgin girl was offered to a malevolent spirit dressed in the skin of a wolf, who raped the girl. Then, one year, the Olympic boxer Euthymus of Locri came along, slew the spirit, and married the girl who had been offered as a sacrifice. There are various stories in Greek literature involving a woman named Pyrrha (literally "fire") and a man with a name meaning "wolf". The Roman poet Horace alludes to a tale in which a male child is rescued alive from the belly of Lamia, an ogress in classical mythology.

The dialogue between the wolf and Little Red Riding Hood has analogies to the Norse Þrymskviða from the Elder Edda; the giant Þrymr had stolen Mjölnir, Thor's hammer, and demanded Freyja as his bride for its return. Instead, the gods dressed Thor as a bride and sent him. When the giants note Thor's unladylike eyes, eating, and drinking, Loki explains them as Freyja's not having slept, eaten, or drunk, out of longing for the wedding. A parallel to another Norse myth, the chase and eventual murder of the sun goddess by the wolf Sköll, has also been drawn.

A similar story also belongs to the North African tradition, namely in Kabylia, where a number of versions are attested. The theme of the little girl who visits her (grand)dad in his cabin and is recognized by the sound of her bracelets constitutes the refrain of a well-known song by the modern singer Idir, "A Vava Inouva":

I beseech you, open the door for me, father.
Jingle your bracelets, oh my daughter Ghriba.
I'm afraid of the monster in the forest, father.
I, too, am afraid, oh my daughter Ghriba.

The theme of the ravening wolf and of the creature released unharmed from its belly is also reflected in the Russian tale "Peter and the Wolf" and another Grimm tale "The Wolf and the Seven Young Goats", but its general theme of restoration is at least as old as the biblical story, "Jonah and the Whale". The Book of Jonah itself is dated to the Hellenistic period (332–167 BCE). The theme also appears in the story of the life of Saint Margaret, wherein the saint emerges unharmed from the belly of a dragon, and in the short story "The Red Path" by Jim C. Hines.

A Taiwanese story from the 16th century, known as Aunt Tiger bears several striking similarities. In this story there are two girls who are sisters. When the girls' mother goes out, the tigress comes to the girls' house and pretends to be their aunt, asking to come in. One girl says that the aunt's voice does not sound right, so the tigress attempts to disguise her voice. Then, the girl says that the aunt's hands feel too coarse, so the tigress attempts to make her paws smoother. When finally the tigress gains entry, she eats the girl's sister. The girl comes up with a ruse to go outside and fetch some food for her aunt. Aunt Tiger, suspicious of the girl, ties a rope to her leg. The girl ties a bucket to the rope to fool her, but Aunt Tiger realizes this and chases after her, whereupon she climbs into a tree. The girl tells the tigress that she will let her eat her, but first, she would like to feed her some fruit from the tree. The tigress comes closer to eat the fruit, whereupon the girl pours boiling hot oil down her throat, killing her.

According to Paul Delarue, a similar narrative is found in East Asian stories, namely, in China, Korea and Japan, with the title "The Tiger and the Children".

=== Earliest versions ===
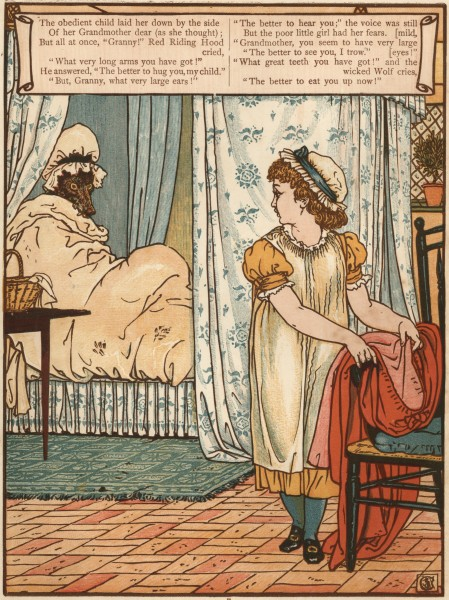
"The better to see you with!" woodcut by Walter Crane

The origins of the Little Red Riding Hood story can be traced to several likely pre-17th-century versions from various European countries. Some of these are significantly different from the currently known, Grimms-inspired version. It was told by French-speaking peasants in the 10th century and recorded by the cathedral schoolmaster Egbert of Liège. A 15th-century collection of folklore described an anecdote about a woman whose husband was a werewolf. However, it bears little resemblance to Perrault's text. In Italy, Little Red Riding Hood was told by peasants in the 14th century, where many versions exist, including La finta nonna (The False Grandmother), written among others by Italo Calvino in the Italian Folktales collection. It has also been called "The Story of Grandmother". It is also possible that this early tale has roots in very similar East Asian tales (e.g. "Grandaunt Tiger").

These early variations of the tale do differ from the currently known version in several ways. The antagonist is not always a wolf, but sometimes a 'bzou' (werewolf), making these tales relevant to the werewolf trials (similar to witch trials) of the time (e.g. the trial of Peter Stumpp). The wolf usually leaves the grandmother's blood and flesh for the girl to eat, who then unwittingly cannibalizes her grandmother. Furthermore, the wolf was also known to ask her to take off her clothing and throw it into the fire. In some versions, the wolf eats the girl after she gets into bed with him, and the story ends there. In others, she sees through his disguise and tries to escape, complaining to her "grandmother" that she needs to defecate and would not wish to do so in the bed. The wolf reluctantly lets her go, tied to a piece of string so she does not get away. The girl slips the string over something else and runs off. In these stories, she escapes with no help from any male or older female figure, instead using her own cunning, or in some versions, the help of a younger boy whom she happens to run into. Sometimes, though more rarely, the red hood is even non-existent.

In other tellings of the story, the wolf chases after Little Red Riding Hood. She escapes with the help of some laundresses, who spread a sheet taut over a river so she may escape. When the wolf follows Red over the bridge of cloth, the sheet is released, and the wolf drowns in the river. And in another version, the wolf is pushed into the fire, while he is preparing the flesh of the grandmother to be eaten by the girl.

=== Charles Perrault version ===
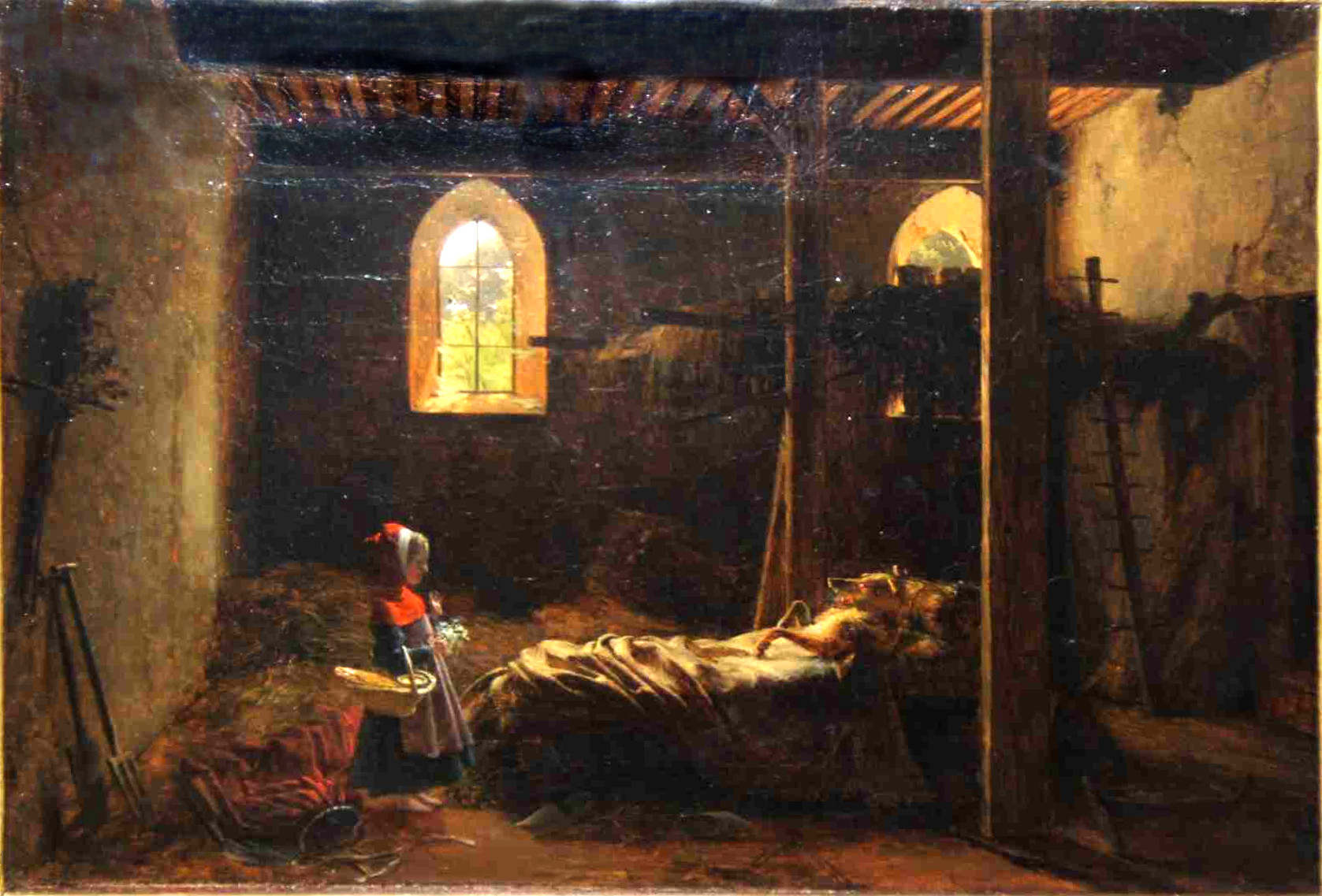
French images, like this 19th-century painting, show the much shorter red chaperon being worn.

The earliest known printed version was known as Le Petit Chaperon Rouge and may have had its origins in 17th-century French folklore. It was included in the collection Tales and Stories of the Past with Morals. Tales of Mother Goose (Histoires et contes du temps passé, avec des moralités. Contes de ma mère l'Oye), in 1697, by Charles Perrault. As the title implies, this version is both more sinister and more overtly moralized than the later ones. The redness of the hood, which has been given symbolic significance in many interpretations of the tale, was a detail introduced by Perrault.

The story had as its subject an "attractive, well-bred young lady", a village girl of the country being deceived into giving a wolf she encountered the information he needed to find her grandmother's house successfully and eat the old woman while at the same time avoiding being noticed by woodcutters working in the nearby forest. Then he proceeded to lay a trap for Red Riding Hood. Little Red Riding Hood ends up being asked to climb into the bed before being eaten by the wolf, where the story ends. The wolf emerges as the victor of the encounter, and there is no happy ending.

Charles Perrault explained the 'moral' at the end of the tale so that no doubt is left to his intended meaning:

From this story one learns that children, especially young lasses, pretty, courteous and well-bred, do very wrong to listen to strangers, And it is not an unheard thing if the Wolf is thereby provided with his dinner. I say Wolf, for all wolves are not of the same sort; there is one kind with an amenable disposition – neither noisy, nor hateful, nor angry, but tame, obliging and gentle, following the young maids in the streets, even into their homes. Alas! Who does not know that these gentle wolves are of all such creatures the most dangerous!

This, the presumed original version of the tale, was written for the late 17th-century French court of King Louis XIV. This audience, whom the King entertained with extravagant parties, presumably would take from the story's intended meaning.

=== The Brothers Grimm version ===
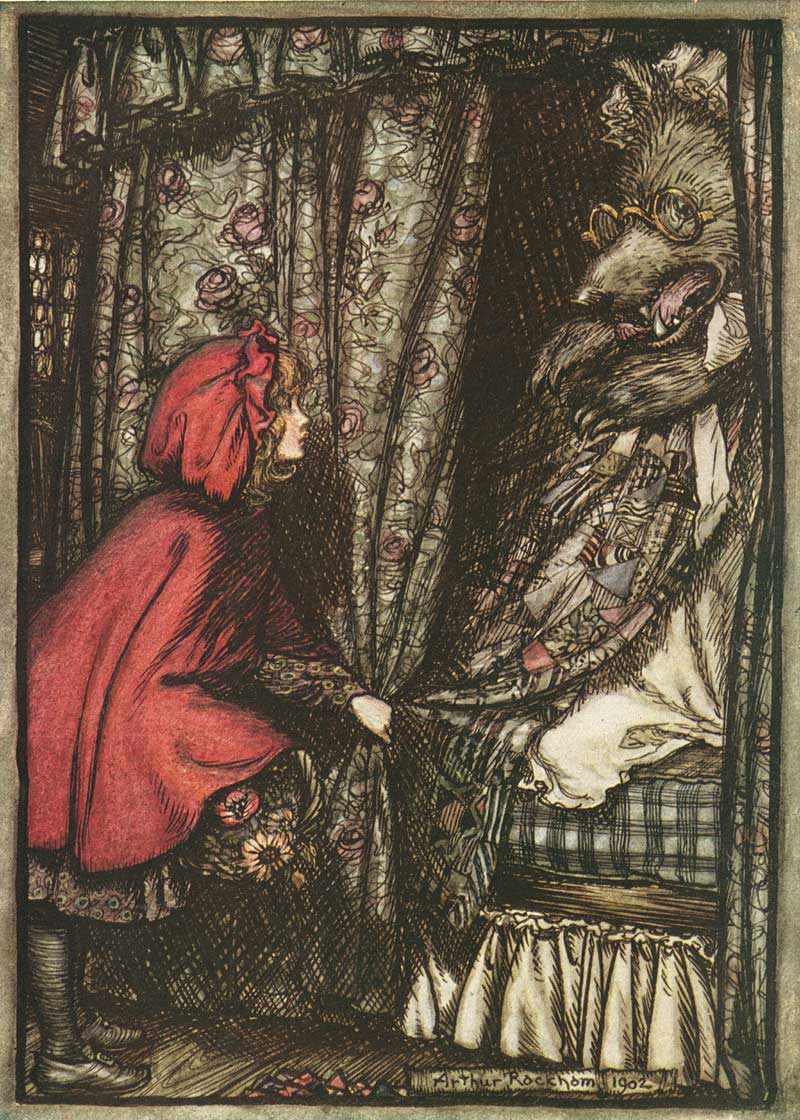
Illustration of "Little Red Riding Hood" by Arthur Rackham (1902)

In the 19th century two separate German versions were retold to Jacob Grimm and his younger brother Wilhelm Grimm, known as the Brothers Grimm, the first by Jeanette Hassenpflug (1791–1860) and the second by Marie Hassenpflug (1788–1856). The brothers turned the first version to the main body of the story and the second into a sequel of it. The story as Rotkäppchen was included in the first edition of their collection Kinder- und Hausmärchen (Children's and Household Tales (1812) – KHM 26).

The earlier parts of the tale agree so closely with Perrault's variant that it is almost certainly the source of the tale. This version ends with the girl and her grandmother saved by a huntsman who was after the wolf's skin; this ending mirrors that in the tale "The Wolf and the Seven Young Kids", which appears to be the source. The second part featured the girl and her grandmother trapping and killing another wolf, this time anticipating his moves based on their experience with the previous one. The girl did not leave the path when the wolf spoke to her, her grandmother locked the door to keep it out, and when the wolf lurked, the grandmother had Little Red Riding Hood put a trough under the chimney and fill it with water that sausages had been cooked in; the smell lured the wolf down, and it drowned.

The Brothers further revised the story in later editions and it reached the above-mentioned final and better-known version in the 1857 edition of their work. It is notably tamer than the older stories which contained darker themes.

=== Later versions ===
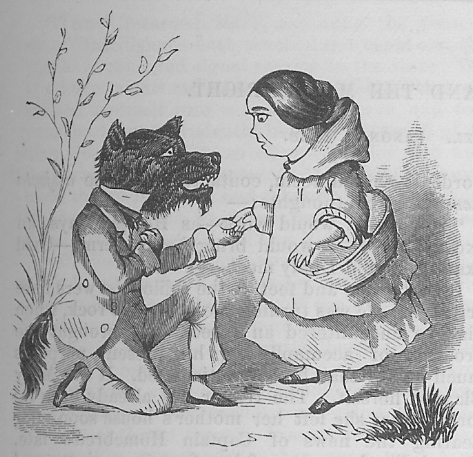
An engraving from the Cyclopedia of Wit and Humor

Numerous authors have rewritten, adapted, or collected variants of this tale.

Charles Marelle in his version of the fairy tale called "The True History of Little Goldenhood" (1888) gives the girl a real name – Blanchette.

Andrew Lang included a variant called "The True History of Little Goldenhood" in The Red Fairy Book (1890). He derived it from the works of Charles Marelles, in Contes of Charles Marelles. This version explicitly states that the story had been mistold earlier. The girl is saved, but not by the huntsman; when the wolf tries to eat her, its mouth is burned by the golden hood she wears, which is enchanted.

James N. Barker wrote a variation of Little Red Riding Hood in 1827 as an approximately 1000-word story. It was later reprinted in 1858 in a book of collected stories edited by William E Burton, called the Cyclopedia of Wit and Humor. The reprint also features a wood engraving of a clothed wolf on a bended knee holding Little Red Riding Hood's hand.

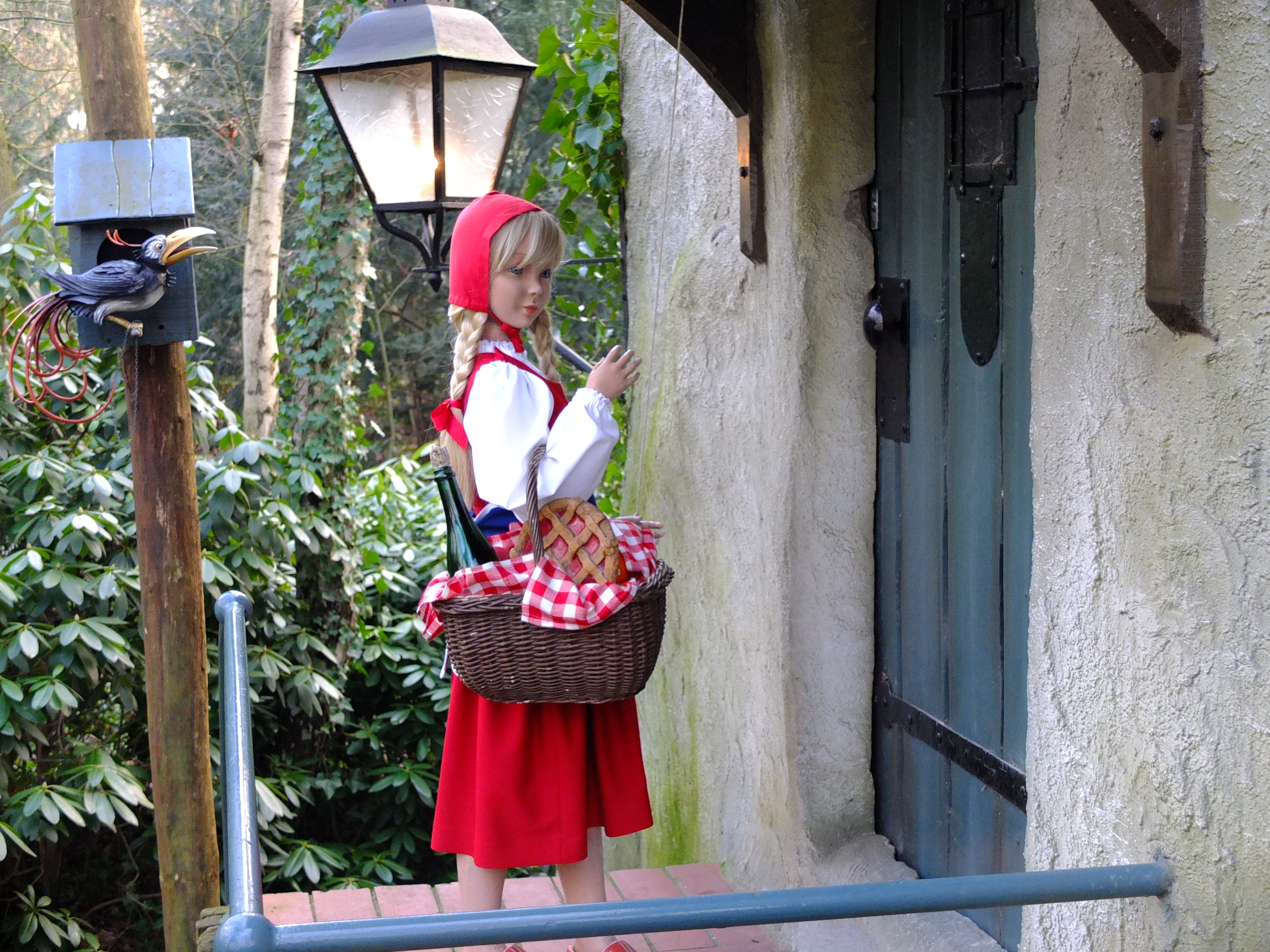
Little Red Riding Hood in Fairytale Themapark Efteling in North-Brabant

Jack Zipes anthologized several 19th-century variants.

Northcote Whitridge Thomas included a variant with a male protagonist in his report of the Igbo people.

An Iranian variant, featuring a little boy and the disrobing motif, appears in a 20th-century French anthology.

Geneviève Massignon recorded a variant called "Boudin-Boudine" from an informant in Le Gué-de-Velluire. In this version, a little boy is protected from the wolf by his grandmother and father.

== Interpretations ==
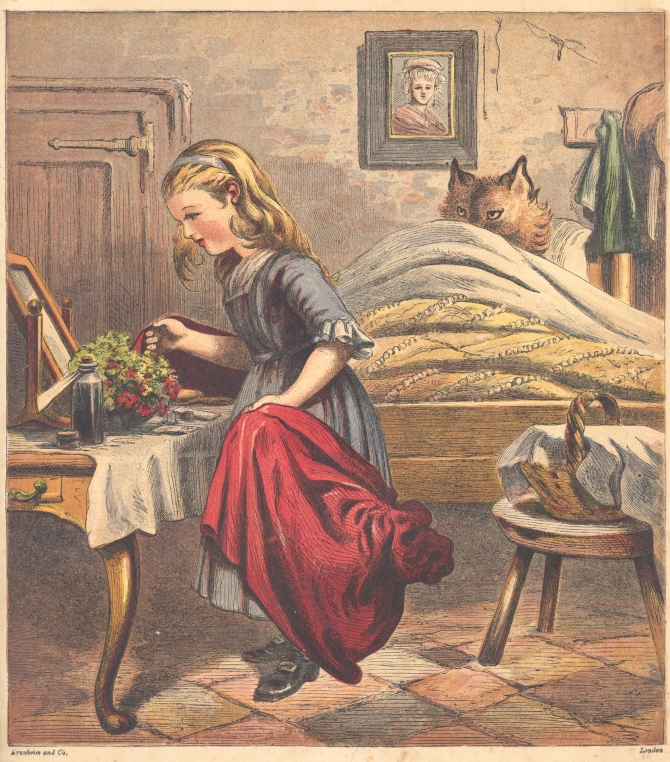
Illustration for a Dutch edition (1868)

Apart from the overt warning about talking to strangers, there are many interpretations of the classic fairy tale, many of them sexual. Some are listed below.

=== Natural cycles ===
Folklorists and cultural anthropologists, such as P. Saintyves and Edward Burnett Tylor, saw "Little Red Riding Hood" in terms of solar myths and other naturally occurring cycles. Her red hood could represent the bright sun which is ultimately swallowed by the terrible night (the wolf), and the variations in which she is cut out of the wolf's belly represent the dawn. In this interpretation, there is a connection between the wolf of this tale and Sköll, the wolf in Norse mythology that will swallow the personified Sun at Ragnarök, or Fenrir. Alternatively, the tale could be about the season of spring or the month of May, escaping the winter.

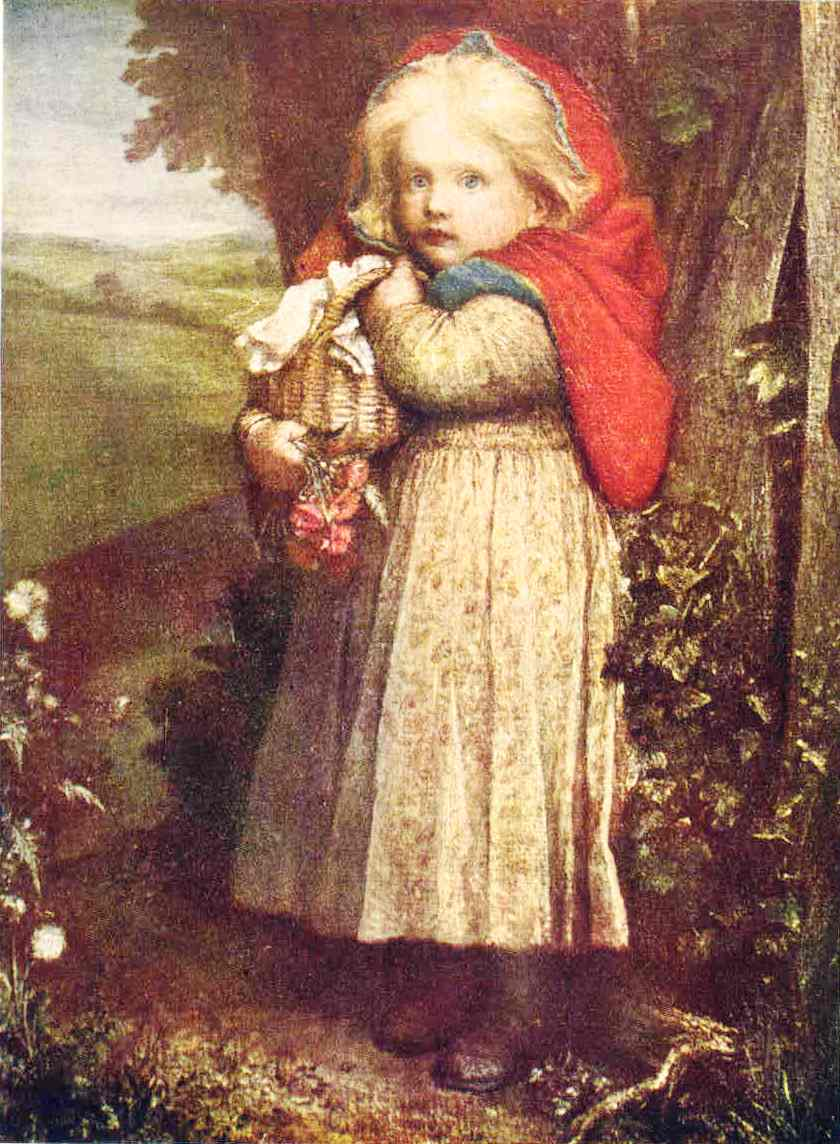
Red Riding Hood by George Frederic Watts

=== Rite ===
The tale has been interpreted as a puberty rite, stemming from a prehistoric origin (sometimes an origin stemming from a previous matriarchal era). The girl, leaving home, enters a liminal state and by going through the acts of the tale, is transformed into an adult woman by the act of coming out of the wolf's stomach.

=== Rebirth ===
Bruno Bettelheim, in The Uses of Enchantment: The Meaning and Importance of Fairy Tales (1976), recast the Little Red Riding Hood motif in terms of classic Freudian analysis, that shows how fairy tales educate, support, and liberate children's emotions. The motif of the huntsman cutting open the wolf he interpreted as a "rebirth"; the girl who foolishly listened to the wolf has been reborn as a new person.

=== Norse myth ===
The poem "Þrymskviða" from the Poetic Edda mirrors some elements of Red Riding Hood. Loki's explanations for the strange behavior of "Freyja" (actually Thor disguised as Freyja) mirror the wolf's explanations for his strange appearance. The red hood has often been given great importance in many interpretations, with a significance from the dawn to blood.

=== Erotic, romantic, or rape connotations ===
A sexual analysis of the tale may also include negative connotations in terms of rape or abduction. In Against Our Will, Susan Brownmiller describes the fairy tale as allegory of rape. Many revisionist versions focus on empowerment and depict Little Red Riding Hood or the grandmother successfully defending herself against the wolf.

Such tellings bear some similarity to the "animal bridegroom" tales, such as Beauty and the Beast or The Frog Prince, but where the heroines of those tales revert the hero to a prince, these tellings of Little Red Riding Hood reveal to the heroine that she has a wild nature like the hero's. These interpretations reframe the story as one of female empowerment and do not characterize Little Red Riding Hood as a victim.

== Adaptation ==
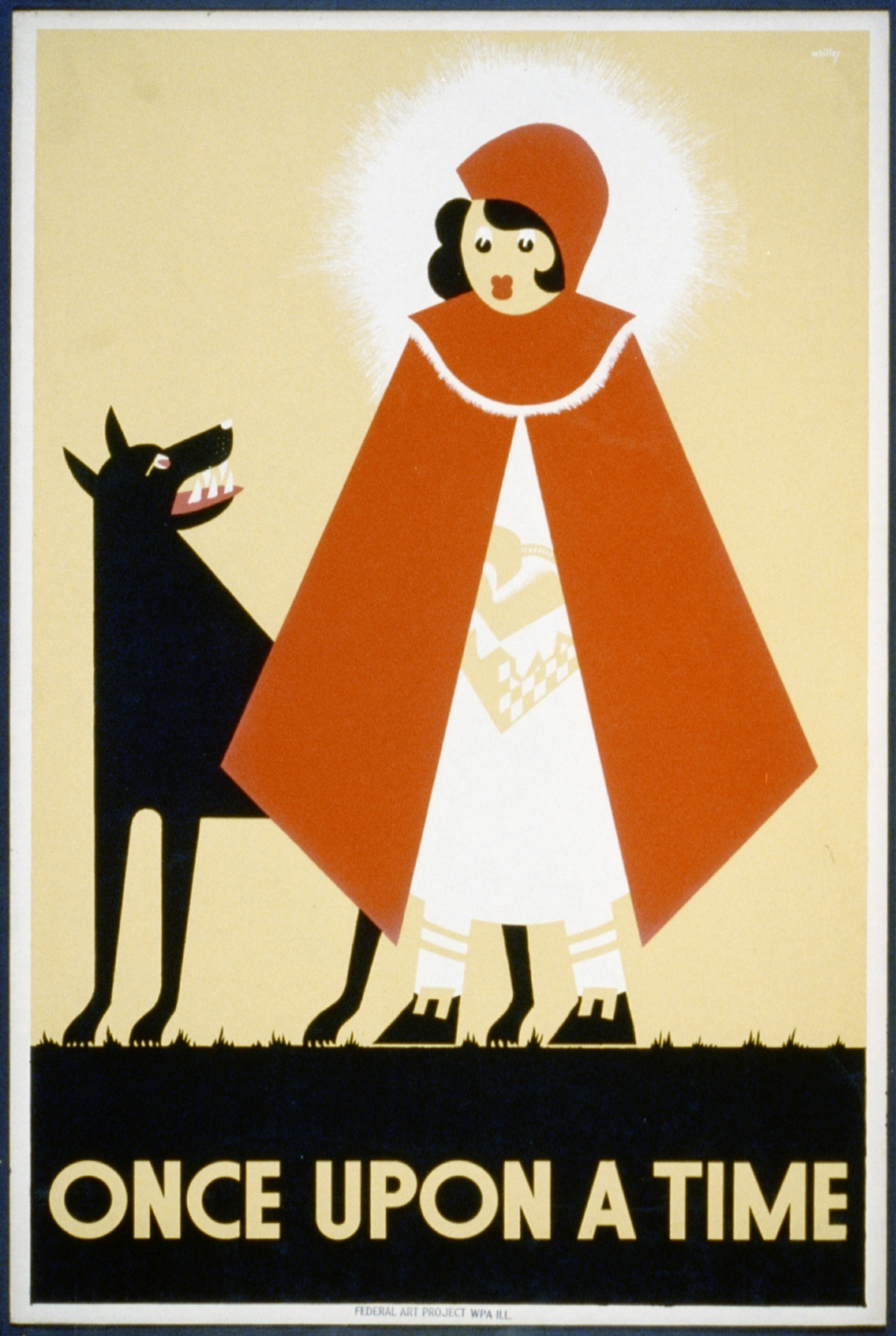
Works Progress Administration poster by Kenneth Whitley, 1939

The story of the Little Red Riding Hood fairy tale has been around for a long time, and it has been turned into many films and shows. The two main points that stay the same are those of a girl in Red Hood and a wolf. There are at least 400 versions of Little Red Riding Hood. These include TV & movies, literature & novels, and children's books.

=== In animation and film ===
- In Tex Avery's short animated cartoon, "Red Hot Riding Hood" (1943), the story is recast in an adult-oriented urban setting Similar modern takes also feature in "Swing Shift Cinderella" (1945) and "Little Rural Riding Hood" (1949).
- The Company of Wolves (1984) is a film adaptation based on the short story by Angela Carter and directed by Neil Jordan.
- Little Red Riding Hood and the Wolf is a 1937 adaptation of the story by the German state which had a deep interest in the stories of the Brothers Grimm and saw them as useful for teaching ideology. This version has been suppressed but has been seen by academics.
- The Big Bad Wolf is a 1934 animated short released by United Artists.
- The 1996 movie Freeway is a crime drama loosely adapted from the Riding Hood story.
- Jin-Roh: The Wolf Brigade (1999) is a Japanese action political thriller animated film.
- Hoodwinked! (2005) is a retelling of "Little Red Riding Hood" as a police investigation.
- The film Red Riding Hood (2006) is a musical based upon the tale.
- The film Red Riding Hood (2011) is loosely based upon the tale.
- Red Riding Hood is one of the main characters in the 2014 film adaptation of the 1987 musical Into the Woods, and is portrayed by Lilla Crawford.
- Little Red Riding Hood is parodied in the Warner Bros. cartoons Little Red Riding Rabbit (1944, Merrie Melodies) and The Windblown Hare (1949, Looney Tunes), with Bugs Bunny, and Red Riding Hoodwinked (1955, Looney Tunes) with Tweety and Sylvester. The story is also a plot element in the 1946 cartoon Book Revue.
- The Grimm Variations (2024), a Netflix anime series, features a retelling of the story).

=== In television ===
- In the pilot episode "Wolf Moon" of the MTV hit series Teen Wolf the protagonist Scott McCall wears a red hoodie, when he gets attacked by an alpha werewolf in the woods in the night of a full moon.
- The pilot episode of NBC's TV series Grimm reveals that the Red Riding Hood stories were inspired by the fabled attacks of Blutbaden, lycanthropic beings who have a deeply ingrained bloodlust and a weakness for victims wearing red.
- In Monty Python's Fliegender Zirkus, Red is portrayed by John Cleese as a huge, thuggish strongman in a dirndl and hood, while the wolf is an inoffensive longhaired Dachshund wearing an unconvincing costume, who is shot by security guards when he reaches NASA headquarters, which he has mistaken for Granny's house.
- In two Bear in the Big Blue House episodes, "The Great Pretender" has Ojo pretending to be Little Red Riding Hood while Treelo pretends to be the wolf, and in "The Senseless Detectives", Shadow tells Bear a variation of the story about Little Red Riding Hood who senses the Big Bad Wolf's face.
- In the PBS Kids series Super Why!, Little Red Riding Hood (also known as "Red") is one of the main characters in the show. She then transforms into a superhero called Wonder Red, giving her the ability to rhyme words (such as "cat" and "bat")
- Red: Werewolf Hunter is a 2010 Canadian television horror film. In this TV film, "Red" is a family nickname of the first daughter in every generation of a family that hunts werewolves, descendant of Little Red Riding Hood.
- Red Riding Hood is a character in ABC's Once Upon a Time (2011) TV series. In this version of the tale, Red (portrayed by Meghan Ory) is a werewolf, and her cape is the only thing that can prevent her from metamorphosing during a full moon when there is magic present. In the Enchanted Forest, she accidentally devoured her boyfriend Peter (portrayed by Jesse Hutch) and ran off with Snow White (portrayed by Ginnifer Goodwin). Her Storybrooke persona is Ruby Lucas, a waitress.
- The story was retold as part of the episode "Grimm Job" of the American animated TV series Family Guy (season 12, episode 10), with Stewie playing Little Red Riding Hood and Brian the Big Bad Wolf. Additionally, both Red Hiding Hood and the Big Bad Wolf appeared briefly in a clip in the season one episode The Son Also Draws.
- In the TV series Goldie & Bear Red is a little girl who delivers muffins to her granny and likes to keep her hood clean and tidy. She is also the daughter of The Muffin Man.
- Little Red Riding Hood is parodied in The Super Mario Bros. Super Show! episode, "Little Red Riding Princess" with Princess Toadstool in the role of Red Riding Hood and King Koopa as the wolf.
- The tabletop role-playing game show Dimension 20 has Little Red Riding Hood as a main character in the "Neverafter" season.

=== In literature ===
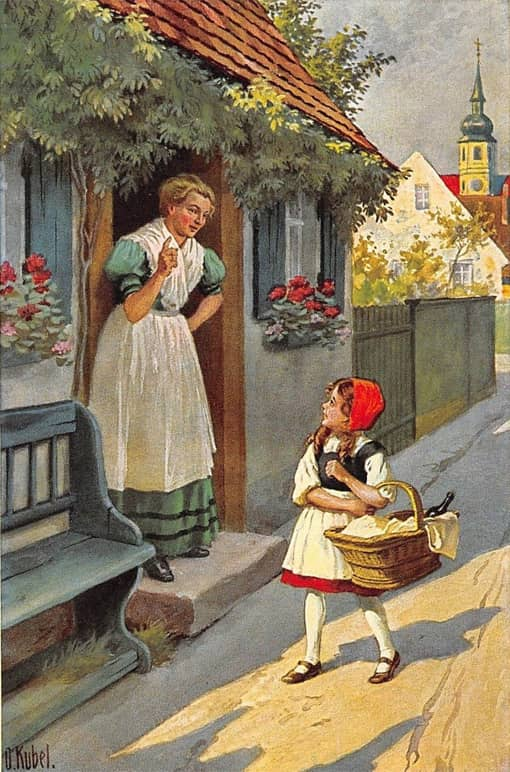
Little Red Riding Hood in an illustration by Otto Kubel (1930)

- Letitia Elizabeth Landon's poem Little Red Riding Hood in The Court Journal, 1835 is subtitled Lines suggested by the engraving of Landseer's Picture. It reflects on memories of lost childhood.
- Charles Perrault's "Le Petit Chaperon rouge" ("Little Red Riding Hood") is centered on an erotic metaphor.
- Gabriela Mistral, the Chilean Nobel Prize-winning poet, told the story as a short poem as part of her 1924 book, Ternura
- Little Red Riding Hood appears in Angela Carter's short story "The Company of Wolves", published in The Bloody Chamber (1979), her collection of "dark, feminist fables" filled with "bestial and ferocious" heroines. Carter's rewriting of the tale—both her 1979 story and its 1984 film adaptation, the screenplay of which Carter co-wrote with director Neil Jordan—examines female lust, which according to author Catherine Orenstein is "healthy, but also challenging and sometimes disturbing, unbridled and feral lust that delivers up contradictions." As Orenstein points out, the film version does this by unravelling the original tale's "underlying sexual currents" and by investing Rosaleen (the Little Red Riding Hood character, played by Sarah Patterson) with "animal instincts" that lead to her transformation.
- In her collection, The World's Wife, Carol Ann Duffy published a poem—the first in the collection–called 'Little Red-Cap' in which a more grown up protagonist meets and develops a relationship with the Wolf.
- In the manga Tokyo Akazukin the protagonist is an 11-year-old girl nicknamed "Red Riding Hood" or "Red Hood". Akazukin means "red hood" in Japanese.
- Jerry Pinkney adapted the story for a children's picture book of the same name (2007).
- The American writer James Thurber wrote a satirical short story called "The Little Girl and the Wolf", based on Little Red Riding Hood.
- Anne Sexton wrote an adaptation as a poem called "Red Riding Hood" in her collection Transformations (1971), a book in which she re-envisions 16 of the Grimm's Fairy tales.
- Little Red Riding Hood is one of the main characters in the 1986 children's book O Fantástico Mistério de Feiurinha written by Pedro Bandeira. She is the only one of the main characters who is not a princess and helps her friends discover the whereabouts of the Princess Feiurinha that disappeared.
- James Finn Garner wrote an adaptation in his book Politically Correct Bedtime Stories: Modern Tales for Our Life and Times, a book in which thirteen fairy tales were rewritten. Garner's adaptation of "Little Red Riding Hood" brings up topics like feminism and gender norms.
- Michael Buckley's children's series The Sisters Grimm includes characters drawn from the fairy tale.
- Dark & Darker Faerie Tales by Two Sisters is a collection of dark fairy tales which features Little Red Riding Hood, revealing what happened to her after her encounter with the wolf.
- Singaporean artist Casey Chen rewrote the story with a Singlish accent and published it as The Red Riding Hood Lah!. The storyline largely remains the same but is set in Singapore and comes with visual hints of the country placed subtly in the illustrations throughout the book. The book is written as an expression of Singaporean identity.
- Scarlet is a 2013 novel written by Marissa Meyer that was loosely based on the fairy tale. In the story, a girl named Scarlet tries to find her missing grandmother with the help of a mysterious street fighter called Wolf. It is the second book of The Lunar Chronicles.
- The Land of Stories is a series written by Chris Colfer. In it, Red Riding Hood is the queen of the Red Riding Hood Kingdom.
- Irish-American author Caitlín R. Kiernan has written a number of retellings of Little Red Riding Hood, including short fiction such as "Untitled 17," "Werewolf Smile," and "The Road of Needles," as well as using the fairy tale as a prominent element in their novel, The Drowning Girl.
- Nikita Gill's 2018 poetry collection Fierce Fairytales: & Other Stories to Stir Your Soul alludes to Little Red Riding Hood in the poem "The Red Wolf".
- In Rosamund Hodge's 2015 novel Crimson Bound, a girl named Rachelle is forced to serve the realm after meeting dark forces in the woods.
- In Lois Lowry's historical novel Number the Stars, the protagonist Annemarie runs through the woods while fleeing Nazis, reciting the story of Little Red Riding Hood to calm herself down.
- The Kentucky writer Cordellya Smith wrote the first Native American version of Little Red Riding Hood, called Kawoni's Journey Across the Mountain: A Cherokee Little Red Riding Hood. It introduces some basic Cherokee words and phrases while drawing Cherokee legends into the children's story.
- Hannah F. Whitten wrote a retelling inspired by "Little Red Riding Hood" named "For the wolf", where the character named Red is sacrificed to the Wolf as part of tradition. In this retelling the wolf is a man, and later on they form a relationship.
- Red Riding Hood is a character in the series Fables (2002–2024) by Bill Willingham.
- In 2024, Little Red Riding Hood was adapted in Jade Maitre's "The Burning Girls", combining the familiar motifs of the classic story with elements of psychological depth, gothic horror, and dark fantasy; transforming the traditional narrative into a haunting and spare tale of fear, resilience and female power, inspired by the petroleuses of the 1871 Paris Commune.

=== In music ===
- "How Could Red Riding Hood? (Have Been So Very Good and Still Keep the Wolf from the Door)", written by A.P. Randolph, was first recorded in 1926 by various artists including the Yacht Club Boys and Dolly Kay. Despite being a hit, it was banned from the radio due to its suggestive lyrics.
- Sam the Sham & the Pharaohs's hit song, "Li'l Red Riding Hood" (1966), take Wolf's point of view, implying that he wants love rather than blood. Here, the Wolf befriends Little Red Riding Hood disguised as a sheep and offers to protect her on her journey through the woods.
- The Kelly Family's "The Wolf" (1994) is inspired by the tale, warning the children that there's a Wolf out there. During the instrumental bridge in live shows, the song's lead singer, Joey, does both Little Red Riding Hood's and Wolf's part, where the child asks her grandmother about the big eyes, ears, and mouth.
- "Little Red Riding Hood" is a rawstyle song by Da Tweekaz, which was later remixed by Ecstatic.
- Sunny's concept photo for Girls' Generation's third studio album The Boys was inspired by "Little Red Riding Hood".
- Lana Del Rey has an unreleased song called "Big Bad Wolf" (leaked in 2012) that was inspired by "Little Red Riding Hood".
- The music videos of the songs "Love You To Death" by New York gothic metal band Type O Negative, "Call Me When You're Sober" from American alternative-rock band Evanescence, and "The Hunted" from Canadian supergroup Saint Asonia featuring Sully Erna from American heavy metal band Godsmack were inspired, in part, by "Little Red Riding Hood."
- Rachmaninoff's Op. 39 No. 6 (Études-Tableaux) is nicknamed "Little Red Riding Hood" for its dark theme and the wolf-like connotations of the piece.
- The Real Tuesday Weld's "Me and Mr. Wolf" (2011) portrays the relationship between the wolf and Red Riding Hood as toxic.
- CupcakKe references the tale and characters in her song "Little Red Riding Good" (2024) from her album Dauntless Manifesto.

=== In games ===
- In the Shrek 2 (2004) video game, she is playable and appears as a friend of Shrek's. She joins him, Fiona, and Donkey on their journey to Far Far Away, despite only appearing in the film's opening scene.
- Dark Parables: The Red Riding Hood Sisters is a 2013 computer game.
- In the fighting game Vampire Savior (1997), the character Baby Bonnie Hood (known in the Japanese release as Bulleta) is a parody of Little Red Riding Hood.
- The 2009 psychological horror art game The Path (2007) features 6 sisters, ages 9–19, who all must face their own 'wolf' in the forest on the way to Grandmother's house.
- In the BLACK SOULS video game series, she is one of the main character in the series, and is also playable as recruitable heroine.
- In Goddess of Victory: Nikke, the character Red Hood is a recurring as well as playable character released in 2023.
- In Lobotomy Corporation, an Abnormality known as "Little Red Riding Hooded Mercenary" appears in the game as one of the in-game Abnormalities the employees can work with. Additionally, its counterpart Abnormality, "Big and Will be Bad Wolf", also appears and is a reference to the Big Bad Wolf archetype.

=== In musicals ===
- Little Red Riding Hood is one of the central characters in the Broadway musical Into the Woods (1987) by Stephen Sondheim and James Lapine.

== See also ==
- Goldilocks and the Three Bears – 19th-century British fairy tale
- Freeway (1996 film) – 1996 film by Matthew Bright
- Hard Candy (film) – 2005 American thriller film by David Slade
- "Little Red Cap" (poem) – 1999 poem by Carol Ann Duffy
- The Path (video game) – 2009 psychological horror video game
- Ladle Rat Rotten Hut – Ersatz language
