= The World's Wife =

1999 poetry collection by Carol Ann Duffy

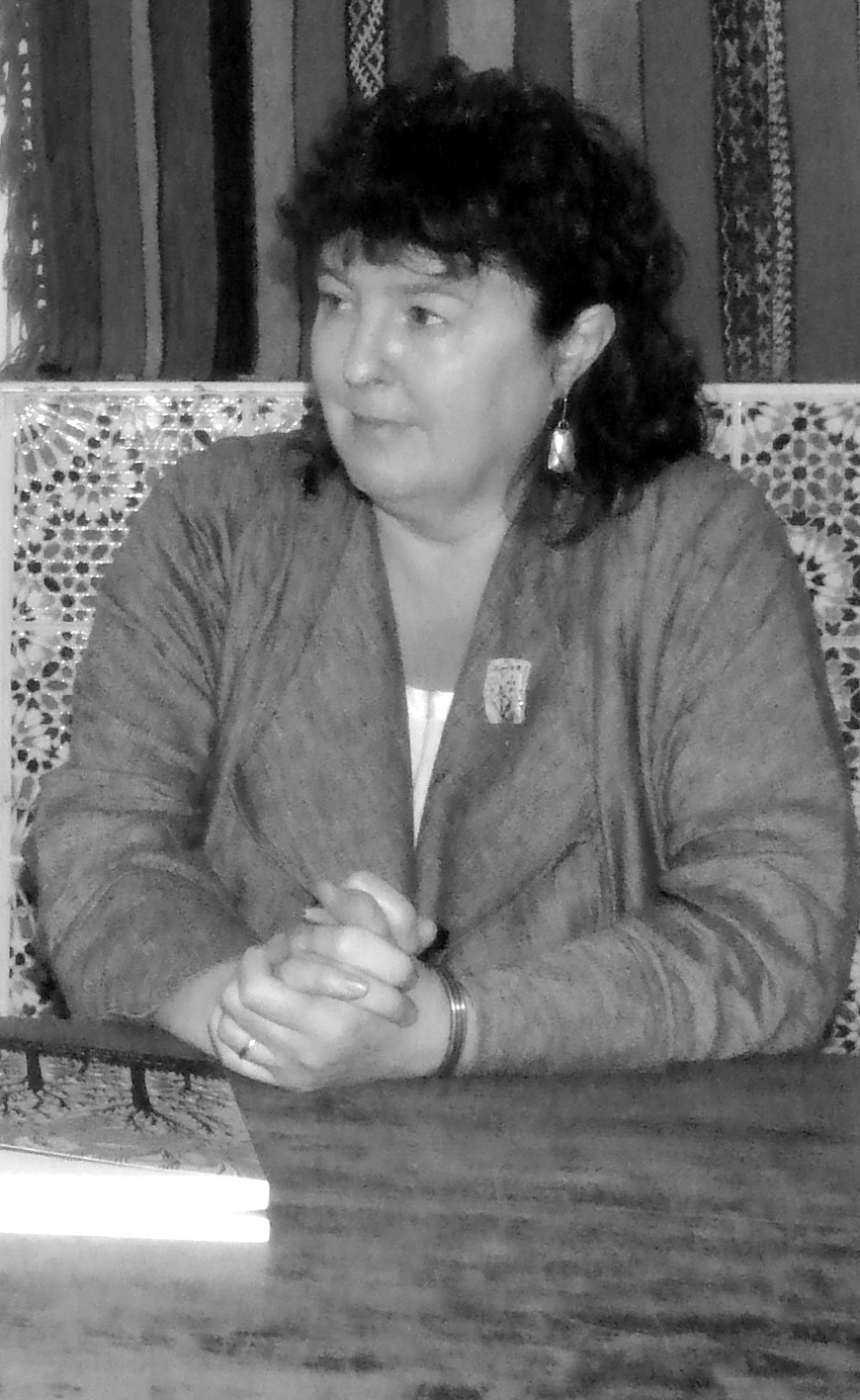
- Author: Carol Ann Duffy
- Language: English
- Genre: Poetry
- Publisher: Anvil Press Poetry
- Publication date: 1999
- Publication place: United Kingdom
- ISBN: 9780571199952
- Preceded by: Meeting Midnight
- Followed by: Time's Tidings: Greeting the 21st Century

The World's Wife is a collection of poetry by Carol Ann Duffy, originally published in the UK in 1999 by both Picador and Anvil Press Poetry and later published in the United States by Faber and Faber in 2000.

Duffy's poems in The World's Wife focus on either well known female figures or fictional counterparts to well known male figures. The themes of the poems focus on the complexities of gender relations, the roles of women, and the often ill treatment of women through fictional, biblical, mythical, and historical contexts. Duffy often also makes modern day references in her poems in order to connect the different settings together into a cohesive collection and also highlight how the ill treatment towards women has endured through all the different contexts and into the modern era.

== Background ==
The World's Wife is Carol Ann Duffy's fifth collection of poetry. Her previous collection, Standing Female Nude, is tied to romantic and amorous themes, while her collection The Other Country takes a more indifferent approach to love; The World's Wife continues this progression in that it critiques male figures, masculinity, and heterosexual love to instead focus on forgotten or neglected female figures.

Duffy's works are described as being feminist poetry and are known for being "love poems that often take the form of monologues" and for using "conversational language" that is accessible to average readers.The World's Wife continues these recognizable trends of Duffy's writing; "the monologue, for which Duffy has become justifiably famous, provides the ideal vehicle for the most immediate, dramatic and arresting perspectives of a host of characters whose opinions are often" ignored. While Duffy still makes use of the monologue form in The World's Wife, her works in this collection are described as being a type of hybrid in that they have the "authority of a ballad – a legend being told, a larger-than-life figure that belongs in myth as well as history."

Duffy speaks of her collections by saying "I wanted to use history and myth and popular culture and elements from cinema and literature, but also to anchor it in a deeply personal soil and make an entertainment, [...] It was fun to juggle around with and there were times when I sat laughing as I was writing"

At the time of its publication, in 1999, Duffy was being "seriously considered for the position" of the United Kingdom's poet laureate, but was ultimately not chosen; she would later become poet laureate in 2009. She stated that her choice to accept the position of poet laureate was "only because, since its inception in the 17th century, no woman had previously held the post."

== Themes ==
Duffy's collection focuses on the unheard perspective of female counterparts of famously known male figures; it "gives a voice to the wives of famous and infamous 'great men' of world literature and civilization". She tackles issues surrounding marriage, sex, love, motherhood, etc., i.e. the "typical" roles of women, as detailed through the experiences of famous characters. Through her poems, she is trying to "subvert classical traditions of the male (voyeur) poet and female muse" and instead turns the focus to female characters who are telling their own side of the story. She takes the cliche roles of women and presents it as a "snare in which they are entangled. It is as if they are forced to live a life as stereotype: the bored wife, the neglected wife, or the woman rejected in favour of a younger model." Duffy's poems make a point about "the way expectations and conventions, or the stories we hear and tell, may be erroneous. Such poems ask the reader to pause for a moment, to rethink their lazy assumptions, to look again at what they think they knew"

Antony Rowland argues that her poems are distinct in that they are placed in a setting of "postmodernity" and "lovers who struggle to formulate their alienation amongst modern, urban cityscape" and that this may be why the texts frame love as an "oppressive terror rather than erotic release." While Duffy's poems still "sparkle with wit, intelligence and an impressive lightness of touch, [they also] draw on some weighty emotional experiences: loneliness, jealousy, self-loathing, desire, the fierceness of a mother's love."

Duffy often makes use of dramatic monologue for her collection; "She is famed for her dramatic monologues, which combine compassion, rhythmic verve and an astonishing gift for ventriloquism, and for her tender, lyrical love poems. This collection brings both genres together in the form of masks which, she says, gave her the freedom to explore intensely personal experiences." But she also strays from this form to reflect the subject of the poem when needed. In "Anne Hathaway," Duffy "picks the sonnet [...] she relishes taking on the competition of the biggest literary word-slinger of them all, [Shakespeare], on his own territory." The poem "Mrs. Darwin" also reflects its subject matter in that it uses a journal entry form, reminiscent of Darwin's original journal entries.

Duffy's poetry is also recognizable for its use of rhyme, "not only end-rhymes, but off-rhymes, hidden rhymes, half-rhymes, ghost rhymes, deliberate near-misses that hit the mark." Duffy employs different rhyming techniques to mirror the subject of the poem.

Jeanette Winterson explains this through the example of the poem "The Devil's Wife," she states: "I flew in my chains over the wood where we'd buried / the doll. I know it was me who was there. / I know I carried the spade. I know I was covered in mud. / But I cannot remember how or when or precisely where."

"The complacent end-rhymes of lines two and four are taunted by the askew “buried” and “carried”, and made sinister by the pagan sacrifice embedded in “wood” and “mud” with the ancient “wude” and “daub” sitting behind the rhyme. Repetition of “I know”, three times in four lines, works as a locked rhyme – lethally right for a mind that can never escape itself or be set free by others; a mind that belongs to Myra Hindley."

Winterson also states that "The title of The World’s Wife is both a tacit understanding that it’s (still) a man’s world, and a joke on the world’s most popular dedication: To My Wife." Libby Hudson echoes this sentiment when she states "a feminist poet must [...] wrestle with words that essentially reflect the patriarchal culture which shaped them [...] the very title used for this collection may be said to indicate that this is the case, referring as it does to a commonplace expression ('the world and his wife') which seems to show women as only tangentially related to the world they live in."

== Reviews ==
The Antioch Review described Duffy's collection as one that fused "form ingenuity and social concern in insightful, exuberant dramatic monologues."

Reviewers from Publishers Weekly, felt that despite Duffy's work being "rife with clever twist," it is a subject that has been done before by other writers and "one imagines these characters would've come a longer way by now."

The Independent describes Duffy's poetry as one that is "famed for fierce feminism and uncompromising social satire" something that The World's Wife continues, but that it is also "playful and extremely funny look at history, myths and legends through the eyes of the invisible wives."

The Herald states that "although all of the poems are fun, lighthearted rhymes they portray an excellent message of feminism and add a novel twist to all the stories we already know"

== Adaptions ==
Duffy's poems have been adapted into a stage show and an opera.

- Poems read by Linda Marlowe in a one-woman show, a "physical theatrical rendering of a volume of poetry" at the Assembly Rooms in Edinburgh and Trafalgar Studios in London.
- Chamber Opera funded by PRS Foundation, adapted by Tom Green; it is a "musical adaption of Duffy's poems [...] the score includes musical quotes of music by female composers"

== Awards ==
Duffy has won previous awards for her other collections of poetry. This particular collection, The World's Wife, did not win any awards but was shortlisted for two.

- 1999 Forward Poetry Prize
- 1999 T. S. Eliot Prize

== Poems ==
Duffy's book "explores contemporary and historical scenes from surprising and unexpected viewpoints. Written from the perspective of the wives of famous and often infamous men."

Each poem is inspired by an existing fictional, mythical, biblical, or historical figure, most often a male figure, to which Duffy creates a female counterpart.

- "Little Red Cap" – Red Riding Hood
- "Thetis" – Thetis
- "Queen Herod" – Herod the Great
- "Mrs Midas" – Midas
- "from Mrs Tiresias" – Tiresias
- "Pilate's Wife" – Pontius Pilate's wife
- "Mrs Aesop" – Aesop
- "Mrs Darwin" – Charles Darwin
- "Mrs Sisyphus" – Sisyphus
- "Mrs Faust" – Faust
- "Delilah" – Delilah
- "Anne Hathaway" – Shakespeare's Wife
- "Queen Kong" – King Kong
- "Mrs Quasimodo" – Quasimodo
- "Medusa" – Medusa
- "The Devil's Wife" – Moors Murders
- "Circe" – Circe
- "Mrs Lazarus" – Lazarus of Bethany
- "Pygmalion"s Bride" – Pygmalion
- "Mrs Rip Van Winkle" – "Rip Van Winkle"
- "Mrs Icarus" – Icarus
- "Frau Freud" – Sigmund Freud
- "Salome" – Salome
- "Eurydice" – Eurydice
- "The Kray Sisters" – Kray Twins
- "Elvis's Twin Sister" – Elvis Presley
- "Pope Joan" – Pope Joan
- "Penelope" – Penelope
- "Mrs Beast" – Beauty and the Beast
- "Demeter" – Demeter
