= A droga do Amor =

Book by Pedro Babdeira

- Author: Pedro Bandeira
- Language: Portuguese
- Publication date: 1994
- Publication place: Brazil

A Droga do Amor (A Love Drug) is a book by Brazilian writer Pedro Bandeira in 1994 by Ed.Moderna.

== Plot ==
The fourth volume of the Karas series begins when students at Colégio Elite are on holiday at the end of the year and Magrí, the only girl in the class, is in New York preparing for the World Gymnastics Championship. The book, is the continuation of Angel of Death, Swamp of Blood and The Drug of Obedience, and after The Drug of Love, it is still published Drugs of Americana!. As the members of the group begin to fight for Magrí, which was the reason for the group's creation, they end up deciding that it is time to dismantle the Karas group. To make matters worse, Doctor Q.I., the king of criminals, escapes from the Maximum Security Penitentiary. Magrí, the only girl in the class, is the one who faces all the risks to unravel the mystery.

== Main characters ==
- Miguel
- Calu
- Crânio
- Chumbinho
- Magrí
- Dr. Q.I.
