= Little Red Cap (poem) =

1999 poem by Carol Ann Duffy

The World's Wife
- Author: Carol Ann Duffy
- Language: English
- Genre: Poetry
- Publisher: Picador
- Publication date: 1999
- Media type: Hardcover, Paperback

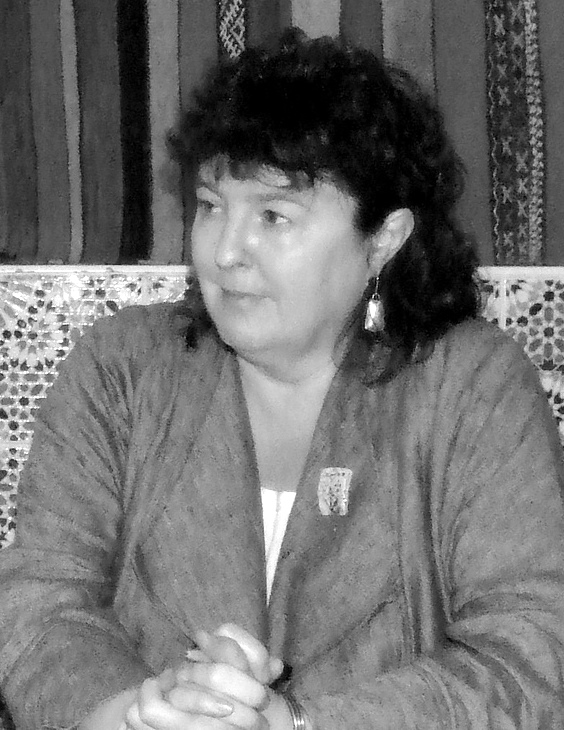
Carol Ann Duffy

"The Little Red Cap" is a poem by Carol Ann Duffy published by Picador as a part of her 1999 collection of poetry titled The World's Wife. The book consists of poems that are based on old stories and tales in which she reshapes in terms of modern day culture. Duffy is known for her trait to take previous stories, tales, etc. and change them into her own "What you can do as a poet is take on a story and make it new" she once said to Barry Wood in an interview. Duffy's Little Red Cap is a great model of her style of poetry in the collection. The World's Wife was created based on stories of heroes that were an inspiration to her. Duffy also believed that these tales and stories did not interpret the truth. Duffy's belief in feminist literary criticism is apparent as she believed that in order to find the truth, the female character was to be dominant. Most of Duffy's poetry has feminist interest. She found that the original Little Red Cap fairy tale was an example of feminism in both fairy tales and English literature. She then found a personal connection within the original story line to help form a dominant female character in her writing.

== Influence ==
Many factors went into the making of Duffy's Little Red Cap. The poem is based on the fairy tale story Little Red Riding Hood by Charles Perrault, which was later rewritten and retitled Little Red Cap by Wilhelm Grimm. Going along with the theme of poetry in The World's Wife, Duffy altered the original storylines to create a dominant female character, but also read as an autobiography of an important period of time in her life. Duffy related herself to the character Little Red Cap's love for her red cap, to her own first love. This piece of poetry is a version of Duffy herself, as it is inspired by her first relationship, and about a young girl becoming a poet. She used her relationship with poet Adrian Henri to create her version of Little Red Cap. The female role in Little Red Cap is obscured behind the Wolf, but these roles are reversed in Duffy's version.

== Plot ==
The poem Little Red Cap begins with "At childhood's end" informing its audience of the characters transition out of childhood. She is narrating the story, as she explains that once the wolf came to the edge of the woods her childhood ended. Little Red Cap examines the wolf, and found herself excited about his large ears, eyes, and teeth! The wolf is portrayed as an older character by the reference of alcohol used in his description"his hairy paw, red wine staining his bearded jaw". Little Red Cap, only 16 years old, pursues the older wolf. That became the start of her transition to adulthood. Being younger than the wolf, he buys Little Red Cap her first drink. The reason: poetry. Little Red Cap was prepared for what was to come. She knew that the wolf would lead her into the woods. Little Red Cap was prepared to leave home, and go into the woods with the wolf. This was the beginning of the love story and relationship of Little Red Cap and the wolf. She discovered an abundance of books within the Wolf's lair. The two grew close as their relationship blossomed. After 10 years passed from when Little Red Cap wandered into the woods with the Wolf she left the woods without him, ending their relationship. When she met the wolf she was only a child, but after 10 years passed Little Red Cap left the woods as an adult.

=== Comparison ===
Duffy's Little Red Cap uses the same story line and characters as does the original Little Red Cap by Grimm, but portrays a completely different message. In the original fairy tale Little Red Cap is a "sweet little girl" who is given a cap that she falls in love with. The young girl is sheltered by her mother, given specific instructions about her behavior and duties. She does not make the right decision when she decides to talk to the Big Bad Wolf, and tell him where she is going. In this fairy tale Little Red Cap is portrayed as a young foolish child. Duffy's version however, shows Little Red Cap transition out of her childhood. Here Duffy used the original story line, but changes the message. Instead of Little Red Cap being tricked by the wolf, she uses him as guidance. Little Red Cap falls in love with the wolf, and their venture into the woods represents her transition out of childhood. Duffy also embeds a message "I took an axe to the wolf as he slept, one chop, scrotum to throat, and saw the glistening, virgin white of my grandmothers bones" this quote clearly defines the point that Little Red Cap took revenge.

== Personal life ==
The poem Little Red Cap is an interpretation of Duffy. The piece explains her first love, and venture into adulthood. The geography described in the first verse- playing fields, factory, railway line, woods is based on the landscape in her hometown. The relationship between Little Red Cap and the wolf represents Duffy's relationship with poet Adrian Henri. Little Red Cap falls in love with the Wolf at age 16 "I made quite sure he spotted me, sweet sixteen", the same age Duffy and Henri met at. The poem describes how their 10 year relationship helps Little Red Cap grow into adulthood "but then I was young - and it took ten years". Duffy and Henri lived together until 1982, for about 10 years. As pronounced in her poem, the two shared a sexual relationship, they were inspirations for their writings.

== Feminism ==
Duffy felt that the original Little Red Cap was a representation of male dominance over women in all English literature "The Wolf's belly, the grandmother inside, are all there waiting to be used. In a sense, in the poem, the grandmother's bones are the silent women who aren't present in English Literature". In her version Duffy modified the roles of the characters so that Little Red Cap was seen as the supreme role. Duffy was able to create a feminist edge in her poem by altering the roles of the characters. The Wolf was no longer portrayed as a villain, and rather a valuable and warmhearted character. Little Red Cap (the girl) transformed from a foolish young girl to a more independent, and clever, young adult. Through these changes Little Red Cap became the leader while the Wolf was seen as guidance for her through her journey. Duffy was able to create a dominant Female character, and also create a story line focused on the success of the character, rather than her flaws.
