= Pedro Bandeira =

Brazilian children's author and poet (born 1942)

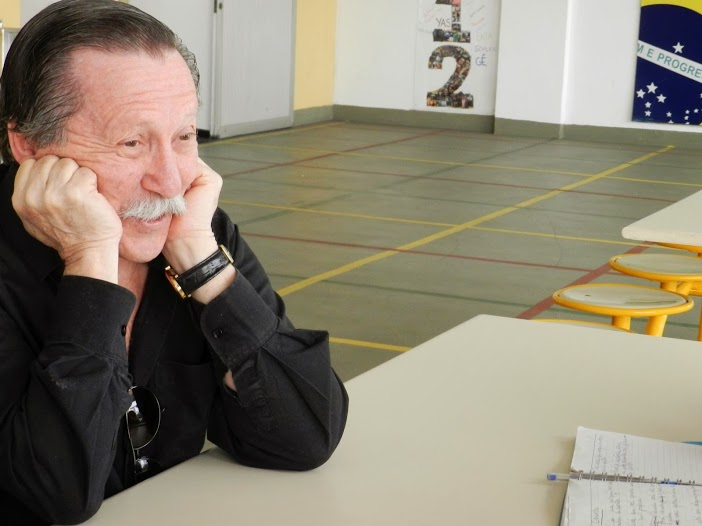
- Bandeira in 2013
- Born: Pedro Bandeira de Luna Filho; March 9, 1942 (age 84); Santos, São Paulo, Brazil
- Education: University of São Paulo
- Occupations: Poet, novelist
- Writing career
- Language: Portuguese
- Years active: 1983–present
- Genres: Children's literature, young adult fiction, children's poetry
- Notable works: Os Karas, A Marca de uma Lágrima, O Fantástico Mistério de Feiurinha

Pedro Bandeira de Luna Filho (born March 9, 1942) is a Brazilian award-winning and best-selling children's novelist and poet, best known as the author of the Os Karas hexalogy of mystery novels which comprise A Droga da Obediência (1984), Pântano de Sangue (1987), Anjo da Morte (1988), A Droga do Amor (1994), Droga de Americana! (2001) and A Droga da Amizade (2014).

== Biography ==
Bandeira was born in Santos, São Paulo, on March 9, 1942. He began as an amateur theater actor and scenic painter until moving to São Paulo in 1961, where he graduated in Advertising at USP. He then found a job as a freelance copywriter for the newspaper Última Hora, until he was hired by Editora Abril in 1972 to write for children. His stories were initially published in specialized magazines until O Dinossauro que Fazia "Au-Au" came out as a stand-alone book in 1983. It was critically and commercially successful, what influenced Bandeira to dedicate himself solely to children's literature.

1984 saw the release of A Droga da Obediência, the first installment of the Os Karas series; as of 2012 it has sold over 1.6 million copies. In 1986 O Fantástico Mistério de Feiurinha was awarded the Prêmio Jabuti, and a film adaptation of the book, directed by Tizuka Yamasaki and starring Xuxa Meneghel, was released in 2009. A Marca de uma Lágrima, which was published in 1985 and is a loose adaptation of Edmond Rostand's play Cyrano de Bergerac, won the APCA Award in 1986.

As of 2012 Bandeira's books (over 80) have sold over 23 million copies. The sixth (and, according to Bandeira, final) installment of the Os Karas series, A Droga da Amizade, came out in 2014. In March 2017 Bandeira announced his first novel intended for adults, Melodia Mortal, written in partnership with infectiologist Dr. Guido Levi. It was released in April 2017 by Editora Rocco.

He currently lives in São Roque with his wife Lia, with whom he has three children.

== Career ==
In addition to being a teacher, he worked in professional theater until 1967 as an actor, director, set designer and puppet theater. But, since 1962, Pedro had also worked in the area of journalism and advertising, starting at the newspaper Última Hora, a branch in São Paulo, and later at Editora Abril, where he wrote for several magazines and issues. As a freelancer, since 1972 he began writing short stories for newsstand magazines from this and other publishers.

His first book was O Dinossauro que Fazia "Au-Au", aimed at children, which was a huge success – but it was with A Droga da Obediência, aimed at teenagers (who he considers his target audience), that he became famous, with this title having already sold 1.6 million copies by 2012. In addition to this, O Fantástico Mistério de Feiurinha, which won the Prêmio Jabuti in 1986, soon became a classic.

From 1983 onwards, Pedro Bandeira dedicated himself entirely to literature. Pedro sold more than a million books in a single year (1996) – throughout his career, more than 23 million copies were sold until 2012. He is considered the author of youth literature with the largest number of works sold.

== Works ==
=== Children's literature ===
- O Dinossauro Que Fazia Au-au (1983)
- É Proibido Miar (1983)
- A Onça e o Saci (1996)
- Cavalgando o Arco-Íris
- Mais Respeito, Eu Sou Criança!
- O Pequeno Pode Tudo
- Por Enquanto Sou Pequeno
- Uma Ideia Solta no Ar
- A Mentira Cabeluda

=== Young adult literature ===
==== Os Karas series ====
- A Droga da Obediência (1984)
- Pântano de Sangue (1987)
- Anjo da Morte (1988)
- A Droga do Amor (1994)
- Droga de Americana! (2001)
- A Droga da Amizade (2014)

==== Other titles ====
- A Marca de uma Lágrima (1985)
- O Fantástico Mistério de Feiurinha (1986)
- Agora Estou Sozinha... (1988)
- O Mistério da Fábrica de Livros (1994)
- O Grande Desafio (1996)
- Descanse em Paz, Meu Amor (1996)
- Gente de Estimação (1996)
- Prova de Fogo (1999)
- Brincadeira Mortal (2000)
- O Pequeno Dragão
- O Pequeno Fantasma
- Alice no País da Mentira
- Aqueles Olhos Verdes
- A Contadora de Histórias
- A Eleição da Criançada
- A Escola da Vida
- A Hora da Verdade
- A Menina Danadinha
- Amor Impossível, Possível Amor
- As Cores de Laurinha
- Como Conquistar Essa Garota
- Garrote, Menino Coragem
- Histórias Apaixonadas
- Malasa venturas, Safadezas de Malasartes
- Mariana
- Minha Primeira Paixão
- O Beijo Negado
- O Medo e a Ternura
- O Melhor Presente
- O Monstro do Mar
- O Poeta e o Cavaleiro
- O Primeiro Amor de Laurinha
- O Reizinho da Estrada
- Rosaflor e a Moura Torta
- Esse Pequeno Mundo

=== Adult literature ===
- Melodia Mortal (2017)

== Awards and honors ==
In 2003, Bandeira received the Title of Citizen of São Paulo by the São Paulo City Council. Later, in 2011, he received the Title of Sanroquense Citizen by the São Roque City Council. The following year, Bandeira received the Brás Cubas Medal of Merit from the Santos City Council. His awards include:

- 1986: 28th Prêmio Jabuti in the Children's Literature category with O Fantástico Mistério de Feiurinha.
- 1986: APCA Trophy in the Youth Book category with A Marca de uma Lágrima.
- 1992: Prêmio Adolfo Aizen (Academia Brasileira de Letras and União Brasileira de Escritores) in the category of Best Children's Book with Chá de Sumiço.
- 2001: Prêmio Altamente Recomendável Fundação Nacional do Livro Infantil e Juvenil in the Translation-Informative category with A Princesa e o Pintor.
- 2001: Prêmio Altamente Recomendável Fundação Nacional do Livro Infantil e Juvenil in the category Retelling with Caras, carinha e caretas – alimentos com sentimentos.
