= A Droga da Obediência =

Novel by Brazilian writer Pedro Bandeira

A Droga da Obediência (The Drug of Obedience) is the first book in a young adult fiction series by Brazilian writer Pedro Bandeira. It was originally published in 1984 by Editora Moderna. It features a group of teens who call themselves Os Karas (intentional misspelling of "Caras", that could be translated as "The Guys"). The series includes five more books: Pântano de Sangue, Anjo da Morte, A Droga do Amor, Droga de Americana!, and A Droga da Amizade.

== Synopsis ==
Miguel is the leader of the Os Karas group of friends, who get together to investigate and resolve mysterious events. The other members are Crânio, Magrí, Calu, and Chumbinho. The group has a secret meeting place (under a trapdoor inside a closet of cleaning supplies) where they gather to talk about what could have caused twenty-seven students from several nearby schools to vanish.

== Main characters ==
- Miguel - He has no nickname. It was his idea to create this secret group. He is the president of the Student Union. He leads the group and plans the actions to be taken by the Os Karas.
- Chumbinho - He loves video games and computers. With his intelligence and bravery, he smells new adventures from afar. This quality was precisely what made Chumbinho discover the secret group at their high school.
- Magrí - The star athlete at their high school, with Olympic medal potential. She is delicate and gentle. If necessary to save one of her friends or if there is a new adventure, Magrí shows a strong and brave side, ready to act and take risks.
- Calú - An actor who is extremely extroverted and playful. He is always in a good mood and encourages the Os Karas during their adventures. He is the most handsome boy at their school, and has a crush on Magrí.
- Crânio - He is the smart one. He is quiet and thoughtful, a chess champion who gets the best grades in school. He drops everything to gets involved in their adventures. His skills are especially useful during Maximum Emergency situations. He too has a crush on Magrí.
