= O Fantástico Mistério de Feiurinha =

1986 book by Pedro Bandeira

O Fantástico Mistério de Feiurinha is a fairytale fantasy children's book by Brazilian writer Pedro Bandeira. The work was published by Editora Moderna in 1986 and received the Jabuti Award for children's literature.

== Book's overview ==
O Fantástico Mistério de Feiurinha takes place in a time after the end of fairy tales. Written by Bandeira and with illustrations by Avelino Guedes, this book mixes well-known fairy tales with the story of Feiurinha, a character created by the writer. Thus, the protagonists of some of these tales get together to discuss what would have happened to Feiurinha, who disappeared and nobody knows where she is. The fear of the characters is that the "happily ever after" of each one of them is also compromised, since Feiurinha disappeared after the promise of a happy ending. However, none of them remembers the story of Feiurinha or who wrote it. Therefore Snow White sends her lackey to a writer, who is the narrator of the book, to find out what happened to the missing princess.

== Reception ==
O Fantástico Mistério de Feiurinha received critical acclaim upon release, which resulted in it winning the Jabuti Award for children's literature in 1986.

Literary critic Lucila Garcez considered this to be a very original piece of fiction, in which a narrator/character, in the first person, reports unusual events, creating a plot full of humor and interspersed with allusions to traditional stories. For her, the book enriches the line, already well explored in Brazil, of productions that revisit the tradition of fairy tales in a transformative way. That is, it has a metaliterary structure that unveils the creative process in a playful and fanciful way, to reveal a reflection on the perenniality of fairy tales and the oral tradition of storytellers. For critic Laura Sandroni, the book reiterates Pedro Bandeira's interest in oral tradition and is a proclamation of faith in the written word, considering that the story was unknown to everyone for the simple fact that no author had yet narrated it in a book. According to her, Feiurinha is a heroine who is a friend of Snow White, Cinderella and many others, but not registered in research by Perrault, the Brothers Grimm or Hans Christian Andersen. Sandoni also points out that the author satirizes traditional fairy tales, discussing their classic happily ever after ending. The critic analyzes that this phrase would mean the eternal sameness and the loss of the sense of adventure in life.

But literary critic Eriana Dantas stated that she had failed to appreciate the book as other readers did because of the emphasis on female rivalry and the princesses' physical appearance. However, the reviewer considers that the book is well-written and pays tribute to fairy tales and the writers who told and retold such stories, in addition to bringing a beautiful message about the importance of the written word, more lasting than the spoken word, and about the custom of storytelling from the oldest to the youngest.

In addition, the book was adapted for cinema in a 2009 film starring Xuxa Meneghel and titled Xuxa em O Mistério de Feiurinha. However, the film version usually received unfavorable reviews.
