= Víctor Jara (album) =

Studio album by Víctor Jara
- Released: 1967
- Genre: Nueva canción, folk music
- Length: 41:13
- Label: Odeon; Alerce; Warner
- Producer: Víctor Jara

Víctor Jara chronology
Víctor Jara (1966)	Víctor Jara (1967)	Canciones folklóricas de América (1967)

Víctor Jara is the second solo album by Chilean singer-songwriter Víctor Jara, released in 1967. It continues the nueva canción (new song) style of politically conscious folk music that he had established with his first solo namesake album, in 1966. The songs of Víctor Jara change from Jara's earlier autobiographical lyrics to topics of general concern for all of Latin America, growing closer to the style of Violeta Parra. Parra died shortly before the album was released, and Jara, her student and friend, stepped forward to fill the political void. After this album, Jara's subsequent work would become more explicitly political, espousing left-wing activism to advocate or protest specific political issues.

The album includes the controversial song, "El aparecido" (The Ghost), which was written about Che Guevara months before the Argentinian revolutionary was killed. The song says, "The crows with golden claws have put a price on his head / how the fury of the rich has crucified him."

== Background ==
In 1966, Víctor Jara met the group Quilapayun (formed for Eduardo Carrasco, Julio Carrasco, Carlos Quezada, Willy Oddó and Patricio Castillo), and they started a "musical society" that lasts several years and that would result in the recording of some albums, including it, and Canciones folklóricas de América. The album also had the musical support of the orchestra of Sergio Ortega and the artistic direction by Rubén Nouzeilles.

== Release ==
Víctor Jara was released in 1967 on Odeon Records label. The album was reissued under various alternative titles such as Mensaje, Desde Lonquen hasta siempre and El verso es una paloma. "El aparecido" was released as single with "Solo" as b-side in March of that year only in Chile.

== Track listing ==
All tracks written by Víctor Jara, except where noted.

1. "El aparecido"
2. "El lazo"
3. "Qué alegres son las obreras (Bolivian folk)"
4. "Despedimiento del angelito (Chilean folk)"
5. "Solo" (Eduardo Carrasco)
6. "En algún lugar del puerto"
7. "Así como hoy matan negros" (Pablo Neruda - Sergio Ortega)
8. "El amor es un camino que de repente aparece"
9. "Casi, casi (Chilean folk)"
10. "Canción de cuna para un niño vago"
11. "Romance del enamorado y la muerte" (Text: Anonymous – Víctor Jara)
12. "Ay mi palomita (Chilean folk)"
