= Quilapayún Chante Neruda =

Compilation album by Quilapayún
- Released: 1983
- Recorded: Paris, France
- Genre: Classical music, Folk music, Latin Music
- Length: 42:44
- Label: Pathé Marconi EMI
- Producer: Claude Dejacques

Quilapayún chronology
La Revolución y las Estrellas (1982)	Quilapayún Chante Neruda (1983)	Quilapayún en Argentina (1983)

Quilapayún Chante Neruda is a compilation music album released by Quilapayún in exile in France in 1983 in commemoration of the 10th Anniversary of the death of the Chilean poet and Nobel laureate Pablo Neruda – who died in September 1973.

== Background ==
Pablo Neruda was not a musician but he was a major inspiration to artist in the music field all over Latin America, especially for artists of the Nueva Cancion Chilena (New Chilean Song) movement. Neruda wrote the liner notes for a number of recordings released by young folk Chilean artists under the DICAP label. Many compositions were directly inspired by the poetry of Neruda and popular protest songs were often musical arrangements for his poetical text. Neruda's epic work Canto General, from which several poems featured in this recording were taken from, has been a major source of text for compositions by folk, contemporary and classical composers.

== Content ==
This album included a compilation of songs from 1975 to 1983 recorded by Quilapayun and new arrangements of music inspired by the poetry of Neruda along with the participation of prominent French artists who sing and narrate Neruda's poetry in French. There are songs based on Neruda's early work Crepusculario (Twilight Book), from his Extravagario (Extravagary), on his political verse from Canción de Geste (Songs of Protest) and from his Cien Sonetos de Amor (100 Love Sonnets). There are also musical composition based on Neruda's work “Fulgor y Muerte de Joaquin Murieta.”

The album opens with, Complainte de Pablo Neruda, a poetical elegy written by the French poet Louis Aragon to the music of Eduardo Carrasco which prefaces the rest of the compilation. Louis Aragon, who had been a personal friend of Neruda, died shortly before the release of this album.

The verses from Neruda's poems adapted to songs were translated from their original Spanish to French by Geneviève Dourthe, Jean Marcenac, Eduardo Carrasco Jr., Emmanuelle and Gérard Clery.

== Liner notes ==
=== September 1983:10th Anniversary of the death of Pablo Neruda ===
Para los pueblos fué mi canto escrito
en la zona del mar
y viví entre el mar y los pueblos
como un centinela secreto
que defendía sus batallas
lleno de amor 'y de rumor:
porque soy el hombre sonoro,
testigo de las esperanzas
en este siglo asesinado…

My chant was written for the common people
in the region of the sea
for I lived between the sea and the people
as a secretive sentinel
who defended its battles
full of love and rumour
because I am a sonorous man,
a witness to the hopes
of this assassinated century…

== Track listing ==
1. "Complainte de Pablo Neruda" (Complaint of Pablo Neruda) (3'48)
  Louis Aragon/Eduardo Carrasco (Arrangement: Eduardo Carrasco 1983.
2. "El árbol [o El árbol de los libres]" (The Tree [or The Tree of the Free]) (3'44)
  Pablo Neruda/Rodolfo Parada (Arrangement: Quilapayún) 1979.
  Text: From Neruda's ‘Canto IV, The liberators’ of Canto General)
3. "Pido Castigo" (I Demand Punishment) (3'23) Pablo Neruda/Rodolfo Parada
  (Arrangement: Quilapayún) 1975. Text: Neruda's ‘Canto IV, The liberators’ of Canto General)
4. ”Playa del Sur” (Sea of the South) (3’30) Pablo Neruda/Hugo Lagos (Arrangement: Hugo Lagos – Eduardo Carrasco) 1980. Text: Playa del Sur, from Neruda's work, Crepusculario (Crepusculary)
5. ”Entre morir y no morir” (Between Dying and not Dying) (4’15) Pablo Neruda/Sergio Ortega (Orchestration and Conductor: Pierre Rabbath) 1980. Text: from Neruda's Testamento de Otoño (Autumn Testament) from Extravagario.
6. "Premonición de la Muerte de Joaquín Murieta" (Premonition on the Death of Joaquín Murieta) (4’00)
  Pablo Neruda/Eduardo Carrasco (Arrangement: E. Carrasco) 1975.
  Text: Neruda's “Fulgor y muerte de Joaquín Murieta”
7. ”Un Son Para Cuba” (A Son for Cuba) (3’50)
  Pablo Neruda/Quilapayún (Arrangement: Quilapayún) 1976
  Text: Poem from Neruda's work: “Cancio de Gesta” (Songs of Protest)
8. ”Continuará Nuestra Lucha” (Our Struggle Shall Continue) (2’50)
  Pablo Neruda/Rodolfo Parada (Arrangement: Quilapayún) 1976
  Text: Neruda's Canto V “Están Aquí” (They Are Here) from Canto General
9. ”Monólogo de la Cabeza de Murieta" (The Monologue of Murieta's Head) (4’50)
  Pablo Neruda/Eduardo Carrasco (Pierre Rabbath: Orchestration and Direction) 1980
  Text: Neruda's “Fulgor y muerte de Joaquín Murieta”
10. ”Dos Sonetos” (Two Sonnets) (4’55) Pablo Neruda/Eduardo Carrasco 1983
  Text: Neruda's Sonnets: XCIX. Otros días vendrán, sera entendido (XCIX. Other days will come, the silence) and C. En medio de la tierra apartaré (C. In the center of the earth I will push aside) from Cien Sonetos de Amor (One Hundred Love Sonnets)

== Personnel ==
- Eduardo Carrasco
- Carlos Quezada
- Willy Oddó
- Hernán Gómez
- Rodolfo Parada
- Hugo Lagos
- Guillermo Garcia
- Ricardo Venegas
- Patricio Wang

== Other artists ==
- Catherine Ribero
- Denis Manuel
- Pierre Rabbath
