= La Nueva Canción Chilena (Inti-Illimani 2) =

Studio album by Inti-Illimani
- Released: 1974
- Genre: Nueva Cancion Chilena
- Label: I Dischi Dello Zodiaco ITA

La Nueva Canción Chilena was the second album recorded in exile in Italy by Inti-Illimani in 1974. It is their first album known also with a progressive numeration linked with the band name, in this case Inti-Illimani 2.

Published in 1974 by I Dischi dello Zodiaco Records, it is mostly composed of songs released by the band with other older albums (mainly the one called Autores Chilenos), but re-recorded in the Italian studios. The aim of the album was to spread in Europe works of Nueva Canción Chilena artists, like Victor Jara, Violeta Parra, Patricio Manns, Sergio Ortega and Luis Advis. Between the new songs of this album, Chile herido is the first song of the band talking directly about the facts of 11 September 1973. One of the most popular anthems of Unidad Popular, ¡El pueblo unido, jamás será vencido!, is also part of the album. Composed by Sergio Ortega, with a text written by Quilapayún, the Inti-Illimani version became one of the most famous Chilean Resistance songs, also used in various protests and demonstrations all around the world.

== Track listing ==
1. Tocata y fuga (Violeta Parra)
2. Corazón maldito (Violeta Parra)
3. Run Run se fue pa'l norte (Violeta Parra)
4. El aparecido (Víctor Jara)
5. Asi como hoy matan negros (Pablo Neruda, Sergio Ortega)
6. Chile herido (Jorge Coulón, Luis Advis)
7. Calambito temucano (Violeta Parra)
8. Exiliada del sur (Violeta Parra, Patricio Manns)
9. La partida (Víctor Jara)
10. Lo que más quiero (Violeta Parra, Isabel Parra)
11. Ya parte el galgo terrible (Pablo Neruda, Sergio Ortega)
12. El pueblo unido jamás será vencido (Quilapayún, Sergio Ortega)
