= El pueblo unido =

El pueblo unido (Spanish pronunciation: [el ˈpweβlo wˈniðo]) (English: The people united) can refer - in part - to any of the following:

== Music ==
- "El pueblo unido jamás será vencido", a song by the Chilean composer Sergio Ortega and Quilapayún (1973)
- El Pueblo Unido Jamás Será Vencido (album), a Quilapayún music album from 1975
- The People United Will Never Be Defeated!, a piano composition by the American composer Frederic Rzewski (1975).

== Political organisations ==
- Pueblo Unido, political coalition of Marxist parties in Costa Rica founded in 1978.
- Electoral Front United People (Spanish: Frente Popular Pueblo Unido), was an electoral front headed by the Portuguese Communist Party in 1976.
- United People Alliance (Spanish:Alianza Pueblo Unido), a left-wing political coalition in Portugal in 1983.
