= Basta (album) =

Basta Album

Studio album by Quilapayún
- Released: 1969
- Recorded: June 1969
- Genre: Folk music World Music; Latin Music
- Length: 42:44
- Label: WEA International
- Producer: Quilapayún/Eduardo Carrasco

Quilapayún chronology
Quilapayún Tres (1968)	Basta Album (1969)	Quilapayún Cuatro (1970)

Basta (Enough!/Das genügt!) is an album that was released by Quilapayún in 1969. It brings together popular and folk songs from Latin America, the former USSR, and Italy. This album included "La muralla"/The wall - one of the most popular folk songs in Latin America - based on the text of a poem by the Cuban poet Nicolás Guillén.

The vocal arrangements reach their peak in “Bella Ciao”, “Por montañas y praderas” and “Patrón.” This album – as X Vietnam - shows the internationalism of Nueva Cancion Chilena/ New Chilean Song.

== Liner notes ==
The liner notes below are from the original Basta album release in 1969 and in the re-edition of the album in Italy in 1974, but may not appear with more recent editions.

The importance of the role that art has to play for the revolutionary movements of our people was addressed for the first time in our country by a historical letter - that serves as an introduction to this recording - that was signed by the first leader of the proletariat cause in Chile, Luis Emilio Recabarren.

Since its inception our group has defined its work as committed with the interests of the proletariat, and hasn’t concealed, nor will it ever conceal, its political aims. This is born of a need to remain forever loyal to the nascent truth that impels and mobilizes our people towards the hour of its authentic historical realization.

All artists that have the opportunity to give their work to the revolutionary cause should do so, and in that manner not only do they fulfill their responsibility with the working class but also with art itself. Given that in an era of exploitation and misery, of subjugation, of cruel and unjust wars, of unrestrained egoism and selfishness, of repression that violate the will of the people, which seek to liberate themselves from imperialism and capitalism; artists that remain on the fence and profit from their privileged position within society – which in a thousand ways aims to bribe and alienate them – betray the very essence of art.

An essence, which yearns to liberate, to educate, to elevate mankind.

Bourgeois society wants art to be another factor contributing to social alienation; we artists should transform it into a revolutionary weapon, until the contradiction that actually exists between art and society is finally surpassed.

This surpassing is called revolution and its motor and fundamental agent is the working class. Our group, loyal to the ideals of Luis Emilio Recabarren, sees its work as a continuation of what has already been achieved by many other popular/folk artists. This side of the trenches has been occupied by artists whose names are forever linked to the revolutionary struggle of our people; the first Luis Emilio Recabarren, the latest: Violeta Parra and Pablo Neruda. The example they have given us is the light that guides us.

== Track listing ==
1. ”A la mina no voy” (I won’t go back to the mine) (Colombian folklore)
2. ”La muralla” (The wall) (Nicolás Guillén - Quilapayún)
3. ”La gaviota” (The gull) (Julio Huasi – Eduardo Carrasco)
4. ”Bella ciao” (Goodbye, my beautiful) (Italian folk - Italian partisans Hymn)
5. ”Coplas de baguala” (Verses of Baguala) (Argentinian Folk)
6. ”Cueca de Balmaceda” (Cueca dance for Balmaceda) (Popular)
7. ”Por montañas y praderas (Over mountains and prairies) (Soviet Red Army Hymn)
8. ”La carta” (The letter) (Violeta Parra)
9. ”Carabina 30-30" (A commonly used rifle) (from the Mexican Revolution)
10. ”Porqué los pobres no tienen...” (Why don’t the poor have...) (Violeta Parra)
11. ”Patrón” (Landlord)(Aníbal Sampayo - Uruguayan folk)
12. ”Basta ya” (Enough, already!) (Atahualpa Yupanqui)

== Personnel ==
- Eduardo Carrasco
- Carlos Quezada
- Willy Oddó
- Patricio Castillo
- Hernán Gómez
- Rodolfo Parada
