= Eduardo Carrasco =

Chilean musician (born 1940)

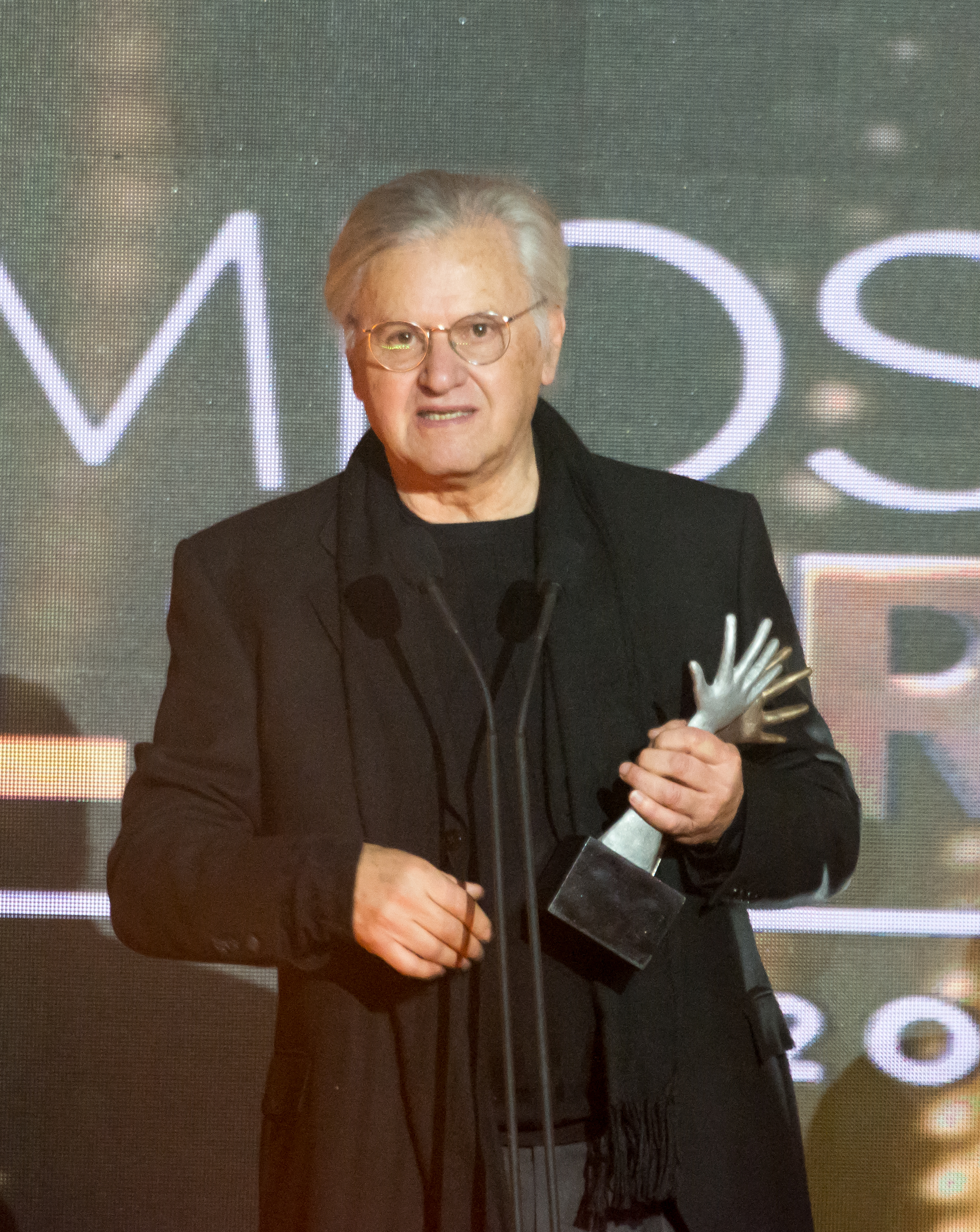
Carrasco in 2019

Eduardo Guillermo Carrasco Pirard (born July 2, 1940) is a Chilean musician, university professor of philosophy, author, and one of the founders of the Chilean folk music group Quilapayún - and the group's musical director from 1969 to 1989.

== Biography ==
Carraco was born in Santiago. He studied at the elite José Victorino Lastarria Lyceum in Santiago and then entered the Pontificia Universidad Católica de Chile to study philosophy; he subsequently travelled to Germany to study at the Ruprecht Karl Universitat of Heidelberg. In 1964 he returned to Chile to continue his study of philosophy at the University of Chile and in 1965 he forms the musical ensemble Quilapayun with his brother Julio Carrasco and his friend Julio Numhauser.

Carrasco completed his formal study of philosophy in April 1970 when he submitted a thesis on Friedrich Nietzsche and the Jews: Reflections on the misrepresentation of a thought; he then commenced to study music at the National Conservatorium of the University of Chile until the Chilean military coup of September 11, 1973.

The years following the military coup saw Carrasco involved primarily in artistic and political projects. After the coup Quilapayún becomes the voice of the Chilean resistance and Carrasco tours with the ensemble which performs in the venues in the world, including, Carnegie Hall, Royal Albert Hall, the Olympia in Paris and in the Tokio Centre.

A virtuoso of the quena and wind instruments and a distinctive bass vocalist of the group. He appeared as solo vocalist in many of the group's recordings, among them “Pregon Inicial” of the Cantata Santa María de Iquique; “Con el alma llena de Banderas” of the El pueblo unido jamás sera vencido album; and "Canción para Víctor Jara". From the beginning he proved himself as a composer with pieces such as “El canto del cuculi” and “La cueca triste” - co-jointly with Víctor Jara – and later after acquiring formal training in the field of music he created some of the most significant work of the group, such as “Vals de Colombes”, “Elegia al Che Guevara”, “Ausencia” with Rodolfo Parada, ”Canción de la esperanza” and “Luz negra”. Carrasco forged the concept of “La revolucion y las estrellas”/(The revolution and the stars) which signified an evolution in the alignment of Quilapayún.

Carrasco has written numerous books including two book about Quilapayún; the first (under the pseudonym of Ignacio Santander) and the second “Quilapayún, la Revolución y Las Estrellas.” He has also publishing numerous works of poetry, philosophy and his conversations with the Chilean painter Roberto Matta, and with the Chilean philosopher Roberto Torretti. Once Quilapayún was able to return to Chile from exile in 1988, Carrasco maintained that the true place for the group was Chile, since other group members needed to return to France, he decided to remain in Chile and leave the group.

In Chile he has held numerous posts: as professor of philosophy at the Universidad de Chile; as director in the School of Music of the "Sociedad Chilena del Derecho de Author" and in the cultural division of the Chilean Ministry of Education. In 2003 Carrasco formed a Chilean based Quilapayun named Quilapayún Histórico (despite the fact that in France Quilapayún were still releasing new albums and touring as the group had always done whilst in exile) which included some of the original members and Ismael Oddo (the son of Willy Oddo who was assassinated in 1991). Carrasco toured extensively with Quilapayún Histórico and one of their concerts held on September 11, 2003 to commemorate 30th Anniversary of the death of Salvador Allende was released as a DVD titled ‘El Reencuentro’ (The Re-encounter).

== Awards ==
Carrasco has earned numerous award from Chile and from international organizations, including:

- Orden al Mérito Docente y Cultural Gabriela Mistral
- Premio de la Academia "Charles le Gros"
- Diploma of Honor with the highest distinctions awarded by the OAS and the Interamerican Council of Music of Washington DC
- Ordre des Arts et des Lettres awarded by the Ministry of Culture of the French Government

== Selected bibliography ==
- Campanaas del mar, lectura filosófica de Pablo Neruda (1995)
- Quilapayún, la revolución y las estrellas (2003)
- Autorretrato, Nuevas conversaciones con Matta (2002)
- Para leer “Así habló Zaratustra de F. Nietzsche (2002)
- Palabra de hombre, Tractatus philosophiae chilensis (2002)
- Conversaciones con Matta (2002)
- En el cielo las estrellas. Conversaciones con Roberto Torretti (2006)
- Heidegger y la historia del ser (2007)
- El Hombre y lo Otro (2008)
- Conversaciones con José Antonio Camacho (2008)
- Nietzsche y los judíos (2008)

== Discography ==
=== Studio albums ===
- Quilapayún (1966)
- Canciones folklóricas de América (1967) (Quilapayún & Víctor Jara)
- X Vietnam (1968)
- Quilapayún Tres (1968)
- Basta (1969)
- Quilapayún Cuatro (1970)
- Cantata Santa María de Iquique (1970) (Quilapayún & Héctor Duvauchelle)
- Vivir como él (1971)
- Quilapayún Cinco (1972)
- La Fragua (1973)(Texto & Músic by Sergio Ortega)
- El pueblo unido jamás será vencido (Yhtenäistä Kansaa Ei Voi (1974)
- El Pueblo Unido Jamás Será Vencido (1975)
- Adelante (1975)
- Patria (1976)
- La marche et le drapeau (1977)
- Cantata Santa María de Iquique (Nueva versión) (1978) (Quilapayún & Jean-Louis Barrault)
- Umbral (1979)
- Darle al otoño un golpe de ventana... (1980)
- La revolución y las estrellas (1982)
- Sandino (1983)
- Tralalí Tralalá (1984)
- Survarío (1987)
- Carrasco (1996)
- Siempre (2007)

=== Live albums ===
- Enregistrement public (1977)
- Alentours (1980)
- Quilapayún en Argentina (1983) (Live in Argentina)
- Quilapayún en Argentina Vol II (1985) (Live in Argentina Vol. II)
- Quilapayún en Chile (1989) (Live in Chile)
- El Reencuentro (2004)
- Musica en la Memoria - Juntos en Chile (2005) (with Inti-Illimani)

=== Compilations ===
- Quilapayún Chante Neruda (1983)
- Antología 1968-1992 (1998)
