= El Pueblo Unido Jamás Será Vencido (album) =

¡El Pueblo Unido Jamás Será Vencido!

Studio album by Quilapayún
- Released: 1975

¡El Pueblo Unido Jamás Será Vencido! (The people united will never be defeated!) is a music album released by the Chilean folk group Quilapayún in 1975.

== Content ==
The album is representative of the material artists of the Nueva Canción Chilena released in exile after the military coup of September 11, 1973. It opens with a song in homage to the fallen socialist president Salvador Allende and proceeds with a moving musical elegy to Che Guevara. There are instrumental andean music pieces: ‘Canción de la esperanza’ composed by Eduardo Carrasco and a version of the traditional Bolivian piece ‘Titicaca’. ‘El alma llena de banderas’ a song Victor Jara dedicated to the murder of a young worker is included, as well as songs denouncing the violent military repression against an unarmed people.

The most well known song of the album is Quilapayún & Sergio Ortega’s ¡El pueblo unido jamás será vencido!, originally composed as a march for the Popular Unity government; after the September 11, 1973 military coup it became the international anthem of the Chilean resistance. The song has been translated into a number of languages and has been heard in mass rallies, marches and demonstrations all over the world: from students in Iran, to migrant workers in California, to pro-unification rallies in Berlin. In 2004 the song inspired Razom nas bahato, nas ne podolaty by GreenJolly, which became the unofficial anthem of the Orange Revolution in Ukraine.

Music and songs are a testament to the spirit of hope and rebellion during the darkest period of the Pinochet dictatorship.

== Track listing ==
1. “Compañero Presidente" (Eduardo Carrasco – Quilapayún)
2. “Elegía al Che Guevara”/Elegy for Che Guevara (Eduardo Carrasco)
3. “Canción de la esperanza”/Song of Hope (Instrumental) (Eduardo Carrasco)
4. “El rojo gota a gota irá creciendo" /The red will slowly grow (Eduardo Carrasco - Horacio Salinas)
5. "Chacarilla" (Popular)
6. “El alma llena de banderas”/Our hearts are full of banners (Víctor Jara)
7. "Titicaca”/Lake Titicaca (Popular)
8. “Las luchas: Canción V [o La represión]"/Song 5 from ‘Las Lucha’ (Sergio Ortega)
9. “La represión/The repression (P. Rojas - Jaime Soto)
10. “El pueblo unido jamás será vencido”/The people united will never be defeated (Quilapayún – Sergio Ortega)

== Personnel ==
- Eduardo Carrasco
- Carlos Quezada
- Willy Oddó
- Hernán Gómez
- Rodolfo Parada
- Rubén escudero
- Hugo Lagos.

== See also ==
- El Pueblo Unido Jamás Será Vencido (The Anthem)
- The People United Will Never Be Defeated! 36 Variations on a Chilean Song by Frederic Rzewski
