= Chicano protest music =

Type of Mexican American music

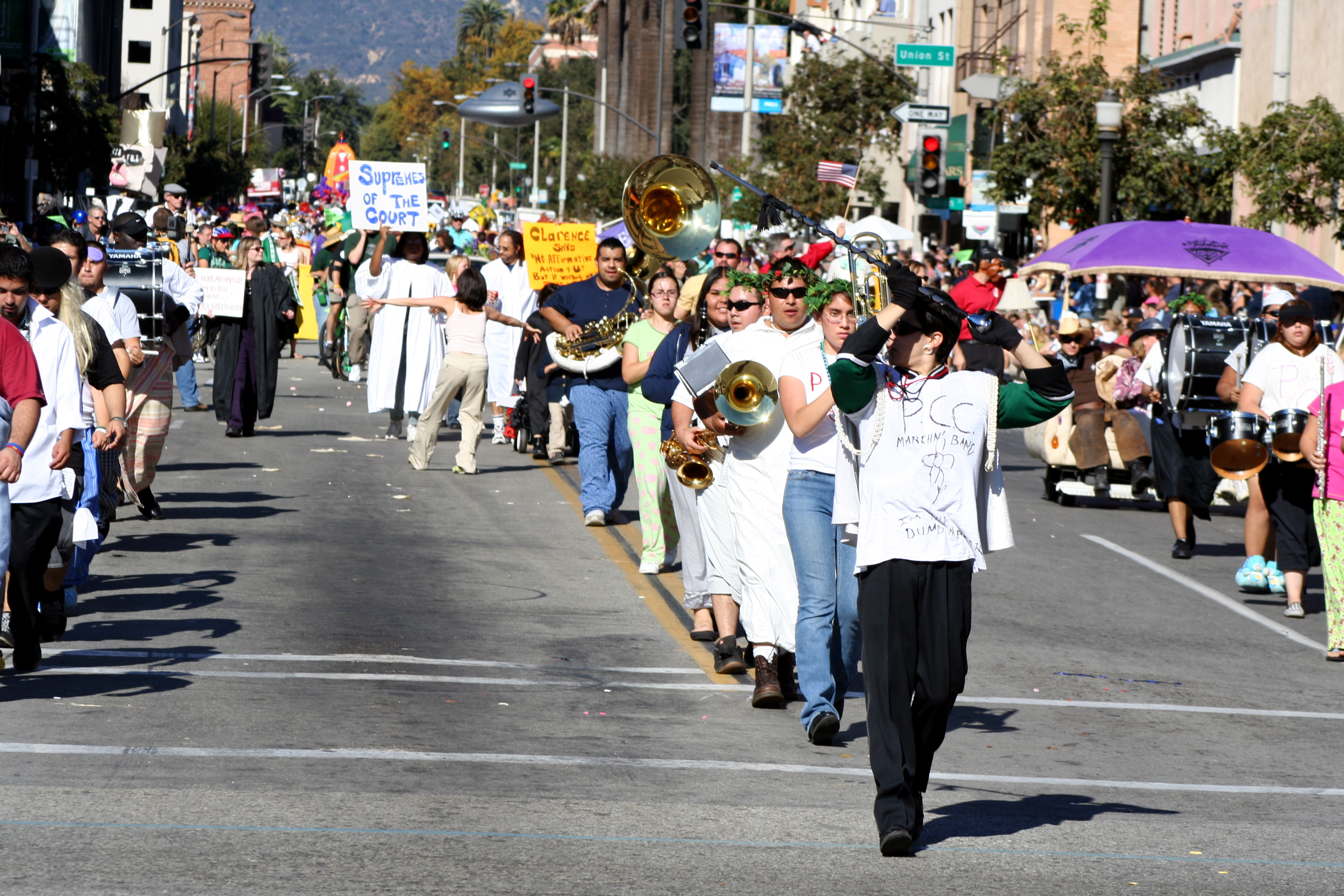
East Los Angeles Parade

Chicano protest music is a type of Mexican American music emerging as a form of political and cultural expression as a result of the Chicano movement (El Movimiento) of the 1960s and 1970s. A fusion of traditional Mexican music and classic American rock, soul, and folk music, Chicano protest music aimed to reveal the struggles of the Mexican American farm workers, education discrimination, and cultural identity. This music was instrumental in unifying Mexican American communities, relaying political messages, and in voicing the sound of political justice.

== Origins ==
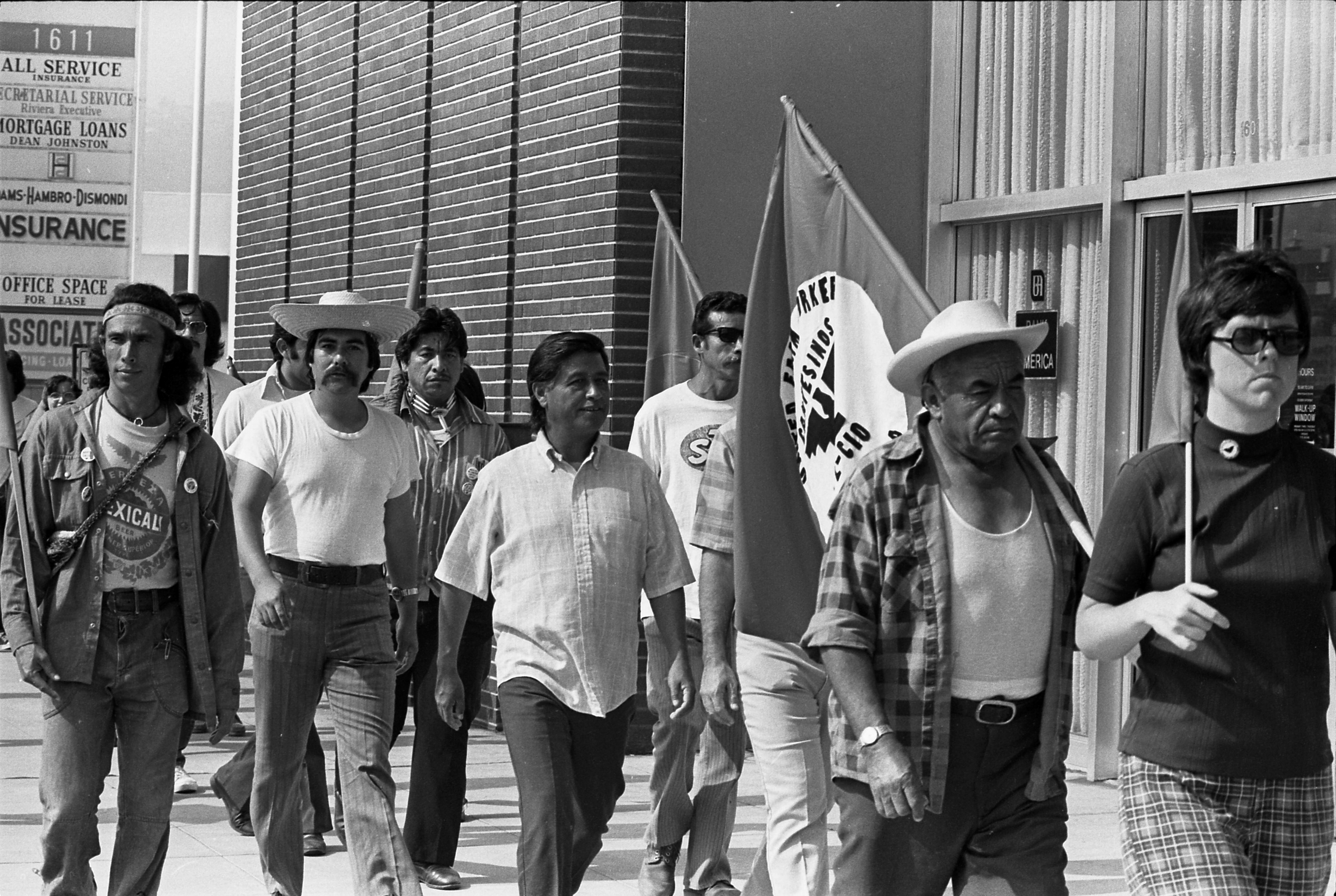
César Chávez and UFW workers marching to Mexican border from Sacramento

Chicano protest music does not refer to a single style of music, but rather was derived from combinations of classic Mexican music such as Tejano, corridos, and rancheras, with American genres including folk music, rock and roll, jazz, and blues. Figures like Agustín Lira and his ensemble Alma were pioneers of this style, combining American, Mexican, and Latin American elements into a unique Chicano sound, with songs sang in English, Spanish, and Caló. The blending of these musical traditions was a reflection of the mixed cultural influence of both Anglo and non-Anglo experiences of the Mexican Americans living in what is the current day United States. In its infancy, Chicano protest music was predominantly associated with male artists in the rock and roll or doo-wop genres. Originally forming out of the barrios of East Los Angeles, it later began to expand into the broader Los Angeles music scene. As the music of the movement evolved, the lyrics increasingly reflected more political and social topics. Some songs, like "No Nos Moverán" ("We Shall Not Be Moved"), took preexisting strike and protest songs and adapted them to the Spanish language and to the Chicano movement, connecting the music of El Movimiento to the music of sympathetic social justice movements such as the African American Civil Rights Movement and the Cuban Revolution.Music was instrumental in relaying messages of redefining identity, political agendas, and social injustices to the greater Mexican American community.

The Chicano movement arose during the 1960s when labor movements, civil rights activism, and other broader social movements began to take place. Although the ideology of Chicanismo is often associated with leadership figures such as César Chávez and the UFW, the movement’s success was largely grounded in the collective nature of participants working behind the scenes. It was the central role of grassroots organizers such as Dolores Huerta, whose strategic negotiations formed the foundation of its achievements. Other notable Chicano groups include the Marxist-Leninist Brown Berets and the Crusade for Justice. As these groups and El Movimiento began to gain traction, the music associated the movement also began to grow in popularity.

== History ==
=== 1960s ===
As issues of poor labor conditions, civil rights violations, and education inequality among Mexican American communities began to intensify in the 1960s, musical artists from these communities began to reflect these issues in their music. Although Chicano protest music was born out of the Chicano rock and Tex-Mex orchestra genres, the music of el movimiento differed in that it was more closely tied to the grassroots activism. Initially, the sound of Chicano protest music was strongly rooted in traditional Mexican genres, reflecting the cultural nationalism of the working class identity of those living and working in the barrios. As the movement shifted from the Mexican American identity to the more politicized Chicano identity, so did the music, incorporating a more broad range of Latin American, American, and pop music influences. . Although California was where the music began, it was also important to communities in Texas and the Chicago area. The East Los Angeles Walkouts of 1968 were student-led protests aimed at bringing to light the poor and unequal education offered to Mexican Americans at the time. Setting a trend in student activism amongst Chicano youth, this set off an increase in Chicano cultural expression in artforms such as poetry, art, dance, and music. Music performed at rallies, marches, and community events lead to broader organization efforts.

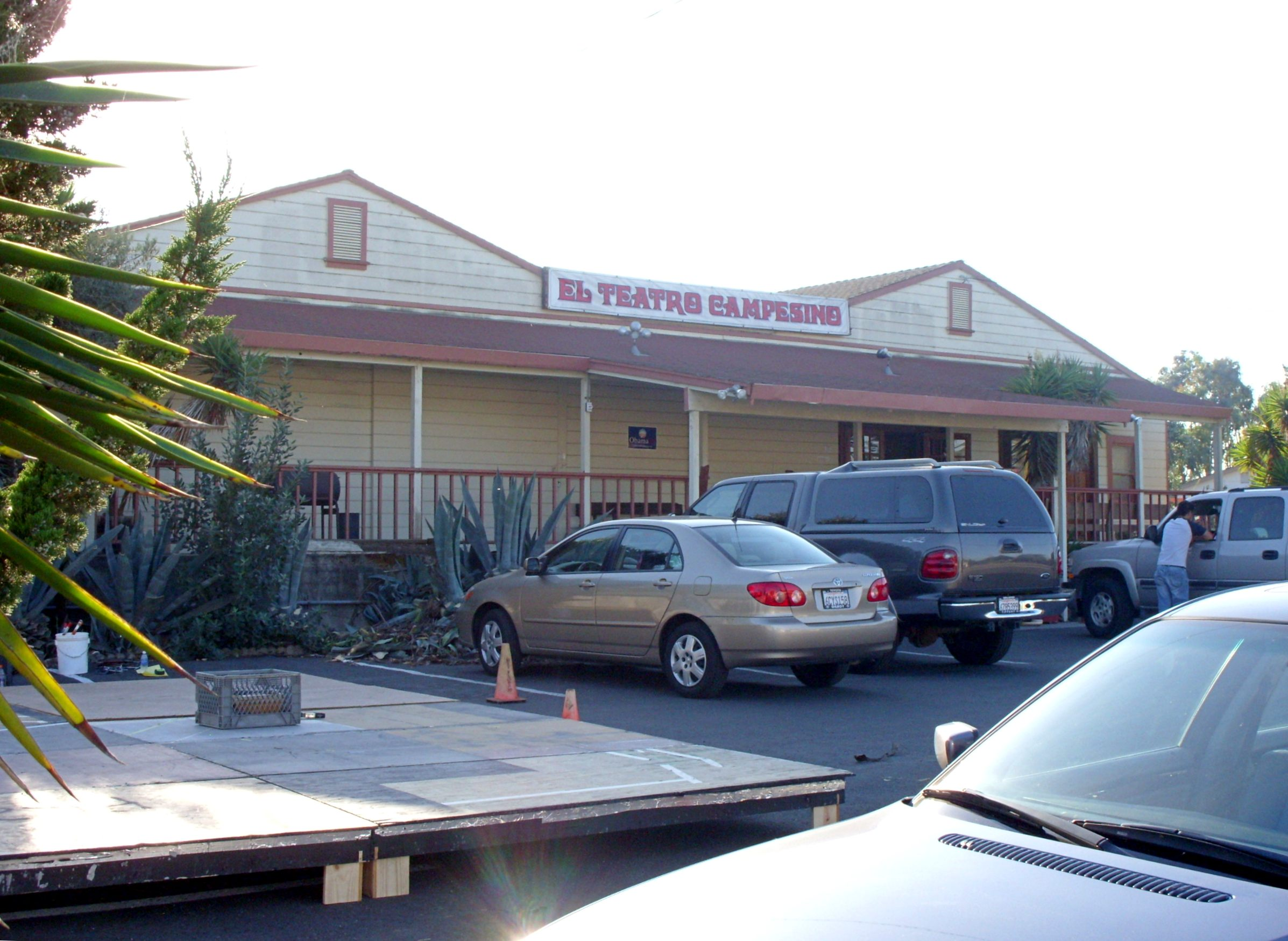
El Teatro Campesino

Groups like El Teatro Campesino, founded in 1965, incorporated satire, corridos, and theatrical performances called "actos" in order to communicate political messages to working class audiences. Meaning the farmworkers' theatre, El Teatro Campesino started as a community based group of farmworkers led by Luis Valdez which sought to bring awareness to fellow farmworkers of the need for unionization. Movimiento music was not confined to California, but spread to other Chicano communities across the United States. Musicians in Texas and Chicago were also fighting for social justice through similar mixtures of modern and traditional Mexican music styles.

=== 1970s ===
Throughout the 1970s, the burgeoning anti-war movement was the stage for a myriad of new political manifestations, including a number of Chicano group protests spurred on by large numbers of Chicano deaths in Vietnam. Due to economic disparity, Chicanos were less equipped to avoid the draft, leading to a disproportionate number of Chicanos being drafted. During this era, cultural means of protest began to flourish, including musical ensembles like Agustín Lira's Alma. Other art forms such as poetry collectives and ballet folclórico also grew in popularity as the Teatro Campesino and other Teatro groups toured California and the Midwest. Chicano protest art of all forms began to address the economic realities of Chicanos during this time as well as the struggles Chicanos faced during the war.

== Themes ==
Chicano music revived Mexican Revolution ideals, including social justice and the reclaiming of ethnic identity. References to features like skin color ("color café") were brought into conversation with "cultura" (culture) and "orgullo" (pride), aiming to validate and reclaim the physical attributes for which Chicano groups were marginalized.

Nueva Canción movements like the Nueva Canción Chilena and Cuban Nueva Trova, and more specifically the works of artists like Carlos Puebla, influenced not only the sounds but the politics of Chicano protest music. By the 1970s, the movement and its music began to shift away from cultural nationalism and embrace a more internationalist view, drawing parallels between the struggle of el movimiento and other crises around the world, like the Vietnam War.

Modern Chicano music draws from this legacy as it addresses modern struggles in the Chicano community, such as racism and immigration.
