= X Vietnam =

Studio album by Quilapayún
- Released: 1968
- Recorded: February 1968
- Genre: Folk music World Music; Protest music
- Length: 42:44
- Label: Warner Music Group
- Producer: Víctor Jara/Quilapayún

Quilapayún chronology
Canciones folklóricas de América (1967)	X Vietnam (1968)	Quilapayún Tres (1971)

X Vietnam or Por Vietnam is an album by Quilapayún released in 1968. This was among the first albums to be released under the DICAP label and was a success upon its release in Chile. The music and subject matter of the recording is very internationalist and was the first recording success of the Nueva Canción Chilena.

The album opens with a song denouncing the war in Vietnam, has songs from the Spanish Revolution, Afro-Cuban rhythms, an Italian folk song, a Soviet youth anthem and a song by Juan Capra that mourns the death of Che Guevara. Songs by Violeta Parra and Sergio Ortega inter alia with the local folkloric rhythms and social themes complete the album. The song "Los Pueblos Americanos" by Violeta Parra denounces disputes over national boundaries and calls on Latin America to unite. Sergio Ortega’s "Cueca de Joaquín Murieta" is based on the mythological character of Joaquín Murieta. One version of his legend states that he travels to California during the gold rush from Chile; finds wealth and love then loses everything and embarks on a vindictive vendetta against those who ruined him. Ultimately the Chilean outlaw, Murieta, is apprehended and is decapitated by what could be the KKK. The song "Canto a la pampa" depicts the poverty and bleak existence of mining communities of the north of Chile.

== Track listing ==
1. "Por Vietnam"/Along Vietnam (Jaime Gómez Rogers - Eduardo Carrasco)
2. "Que la tortilla se vuelva"/May the tables turn (Chicho Sánchez Ferlosio)
3. "Canción fúnebre para el Che Guevara"/Mournful song for Che Guevara (Juan Capra)
4. "Mamma mia dame cento lire"/Mother dear give me 100 liras (Italian Folk - Italian partisans Hymn)
5. "La zamba del riego"/Zamba song for the watering (Armando Tejada Gómez - Óscar Matus)
6. "Himno de las juventudes mundiales"/Hymn of World Youth (Anónimo)
7. "El turururururú" (2ª versión) (from the Spanish Revolution)
8. "Qué dirá el Santo Padre"/What does the Holy Father have to say (Violeta Parra)
9. "Canto a la pampa"/Song for the Pampas (Fernando Pezoa Véliz - Popular)
10. "La bola"/The ball" (Carlos Puebla - Cuban folk)
11. "Los pueblos americanos"/The common people of America (Violeta Parra)
12. "Cueca de Joaquín Murieta"/Cueca dance for Joaquín Murieta (Pablo Neruda - Sergio Ortega)

== Personnel ==
- Eduardo Carrasco
- Julio Carrasco
- Carlos Quezada
- Willy Oddó
- Patricio Castillo
