= Inti+Quila =

Inti+Quila is the name utilized by the historic Chilean Nueva Canción groups Inti-Illimani and Quilapayún during their recent collaborative artistic efforts. These have included a Latin American and European tour, as well as the release of a CD and a DVD compilation of their joint concerts. The Inti+Quila denomination has been reserved for use by the Santiago, Chile-based "historic" factions of the groups.

Yet another conflict between the "historic" factions and the "new" lineups has erupted with the other Inti-Illimani and the Paris-based Quilapayún currently planning to tour Europe using the Inti+Quila name. In this particular case the term was clearly developed by the Chile-based historic members of both groups. The latter Inti+Quila are planning a Chilean tour in 2006, which could lead to mass confusion as both Inti+Quila collaborations will be performing at the same time. The groups remain extremely popular in both Latin America and Europe often playing to sold out shows wherever they go.
