= Willy Oddó =

- Born: Guillermo Oddó Parraguez; October 14, 1943; Santiago de Chile
- Origin: Universidad Técnica del Estado
- Died: November 7, 1991 (aged 48) Santiago de Chile
- Genres: Nueva Cancion Chilena, Protest music, Chilean music
- Occupations: Musician, singer
- Instruments: Spanish guitar, Quena, Percussion, Baritone
- Years active: 1967–1987
- Labels: DICAP, EMI, Warner
- Formerly of: Quilapayún

Guillermo Oddó Parraguez (October 14, 1943 – November 7, 1991), better knolwn as Willy Oddó, was a Chilean musician and engineer known as a leading vocalist in the Chilean folk music ensemble, Quilapayún between 1967 and 1987.

== Biography ==
He was born in Chile and studied at the State Technical University in Santiago de Chile, where he participated in the musical "peñas" and other cultural and student activities together with Hernan Gomez. He spent some time at the Naval Academy, where he showed an aptitude for playing football. He joined Quilapayún in 1967 to replace Julio Numhauser (who left the group) and he rapidly become the most distinctive and loved member of the musical ensemble.

Oddó was Quilapayun's baritenor and played guitar, winds, percussion and was central on stage during live performances. He was the solo vocal on a number of songs, including Canto a la Pampa and Mamma mia dame cento lire of the X Vietnam album, La Carta from the Basta album, Soy obrero pampino... of the Cantata Santa María de Iquique, and Pido Castigo. He was a lover of Argentine folk music (especially of tangos and zambas) and a great fan of Carlos Gardel and Los Fronterizos.

Oddó was on tour in France as part of Quilapayun when on September 11, 1973 a US-backed military coup overthrew the democratically elected socialist government of Salvador Allende – who had appointed the group the role of "cultural ambassadors". Oddó, along with the other members of Quilapayun, remained in exile until 1988 when the Pinochet dictatorship began to lift some of the controls it had on its political opponents. In 1987 Oddo went to work in Argentina and in 1988 he returned to his native country of Chile and worked at the Municipality of Santiago until November 7, 1991, when he was murdered.

== Discography ==
=== Studio albums ===
- Canciones folklóricas de América (1967) (Quilapayún & Víctor Jara)
- X Vietnam (1968)
- Quilapayún Tres (1968)
- Basta (1969)
- Quilapayún Cuatro (1970)
- Cantata Santa María de Iquique (1970) (Quilapayún & Héctor Duvauchelle)
- Vivir como él (1971)
- Quilapayún Cinco (1972)
- La Fragua (1973) (Text and music by Sergio Ortega)
- El pueblo unido jamás será vencido (Yhtenäistä Kansaa Ei Voi) (1974)
- El Pueblo Unido Jamás Será Vencido (1975)
- Adelante (1975)
- Patria (1976)
- La marche et le drapeau (1977)
- Cantata Santa María de Iquique (Nueva versión) (1978) (Quilapayún & Jean-Louis Barrault)
- Umbral (1979)
- Darle al otoño un golpe de ventana... (1980)
- La revolución y las estrellas (1982)
- Tralalí Tralalá (1984)
- Survarío (1987)

=== Live albums ===
- Enregistrement public (1977)
- Alentours (1980)
- Quilapayún en Argentina (1983) (Live in Argentina)
- Quilapayún en Argentina Vol II (1985) (Live in Argentina Vol. II)
- Quilapayún en Chile (1989) (Live in Chile)

=== Compilations ===
- Quilapayún Chante Neruda (1983)
- Antología 1968–1992 (1998)
- La vida contra la muerte (Life against death) (2005)
- La fuerza de la historia (The force of history) (2006)
