= Elianne García =

Former Spanish cabaret star

- Born: 1953 (age 72–73); Seville, Spain

Elianne García (born 1953) is a former Spanish vedette star.

== Early life and career ==
García was born in Seville, Spain in 1953. She later moved with her family to Madrid. She was the target of persecutions by the Francoist administration while living in Madrid due to being a trans woman, eventually forcing her to relocate to Barcelona.

After relocating to Barcelona, she entered the local cabaret scene. She debuted at the Whisky Twist club and eventually performed at the Barcelona de Noche, a well-known cabaret spot in Barcelona. She simultaneously began transitioning from male to female.

She moved back to Madrid in 1980. She began performing at the Gay Club with shows such as "Burbujas Gay", "Libérate", "Todo corazón", and "Locas de amor". In 1981, she appeared in the documentary Gay Club, directed by Tito Fernández. In 1982, she was interviewed by the magazine Interviú, describing instances of police brutality during the Franco administration. She continued to perform in cabaret scenes in Madrid, Valencia, Murcia, and Benidorm.

In the 1990s, she retired from cabaret and was forced to detransition for personal reasons.

== Legacy ==
Other than for cabaret, García is known for being persecuted by the Franco administration for being transgender. She was imprisoned in Carabanchel Prison 4 times under the provisions of the Law on Dangerousness and Social Rehabilitation.

In 2010, she criticized the Spanish government for not compensating LGBTQ victims of repression during the Franco administration, despite already having the documents needed to. She claimed herself that she was arrested six times for being transgender without being notified of the charges against her.
