= Quilapayún (album) =

Studio album by Quilapayún
- Released: 1966
- Label: Odeon
- Producer: Ruben Nouzeilles

Quilapayún is the self-titled debut album released by the Chilean musical group Quilapayún in 1966.

== Track listing ==
1. "La paloma"/The dove (Eduardo Carrasco)
2. "El forastero"/The foreigner (Carlos Préndez Saldías - Eduardo Carrasco)
3. "El canto de la cúculi"/The song of the turtle dove (Eduardo Carrasco)
4. "El pueblo"/The People (Ángel Parra)
5. "La boliviana"/The Bolivian girl (Popular)
6. "La cueca triste"/The Sad Cueca dance (Víctor Jara - Eduardo Carrasco)
7. "Canción del minero" [o El minero]/Song of the miner (Víctor Jara)
8. "Dos palomitas"/Two doves (Popular)
9. "Por una pequeña chispa"/For a little spark (Popular)
10. "La perdida"/The loss (Juan Ramón Jiménez - Quilapayún)
11. "El borrachito"/The drunkard (Popular)
12. "Somos pájaros libres"/We are free birds (Víctor Jara)

== Personnel ==
- Eduardo Carrasco
- Julio Carrasco
- Julio Numhauser
- Carlos Quezada
- Víctor Jara
