= Nueva canción chilena =

Movement and genre of Chilean pop

- Stylistic origins: Latin American music, folk music, guitar music, Andean music
- Cultural origins: Chilean culture, Music and politics
- Typical instruments: Bass guitar, charango, drums, guitar, pan flute

Regional scenes
- Argentina; Brazil; Bolivia; Chile; Colombia; Cuba; Mexico; Nicaragua; Paraguay; Peru; Portugal; Spain; Uruguay; Venezuela

Nueva canción chilena (English: new Chilean song) was a movement and genre of Chilean music incorporating strong political and social themes, taking influences from traditional or folk music of Chile. The movement was to spread throughout Latin America during the 1960s and 1970s, in what is called "Nueva canción" sparking the renewal in traditional folk music and playing a key role in political movements in the region.

The foundations of the Chilean New Song were laid through the efforts of Violeta Parra to revive over 3,000 Chilean songs, recipes, traditions, and proverbs, and it eventually aligned with the 1970 presidential campaign of Salvador Allende, incorporating the songs of Víctor Jara, Inti-Illimani and Quilapayún among others.

Other key proponents of the movement include Patricio Manns, Rolando Alarcón, Payo Grondona, Patricio Castillo, Homero Caro, and Kiko Álvarez, as well as non-Chilean musicians, such as César Isella and Atahualpa Yupanqui from Argentina and Paco Ibáñez from Spain.

== History ==
The Chilean New Song movement was spurred by a renewed interest in Chilean traditional music and folklore in the late 1950s and early 1960s. Folk singers such as Violeta Parra and Víctor Jara traversed the regions of Chile both collecting traditional melodies and songs and seeking inspiration to create songs with social themes. These songs diverged from songs known in the cities at the time, which were often stylized interpretations of central Chilean folk music that emphasized patriotism and idyllic representations of country life; in contrast, the New Song sought to give a voice to Chile's rural peoples, its working class, and their realities. Early musicians in the movement often used folk instruments such as the quena (Andean flute) or zampoñas (pan-pipes). This phase of the Chilean New Song has been referred to as the "discovery and protest" phase.

Violeta Parra in particular played a key role in this phase of the New Song as she was committed to reviving Chilean traditional songs and bringing a voice to the Chilean poor. In the 1960s, Parra founded La Peña de Los Parra in Santiago alongside her son Ángel Parra, also a key figure in the movement, and this became a meeting place for musicians of the New Song. Parra's impact on the movement is widely acknowledged. In 1981, Cuban singer Silvio Rodríguez remarked that her influence on the Latin American New Song movement cannot be understated: "Violeta is fundamental. Nothing would have been as it is had it not been for Violeta".

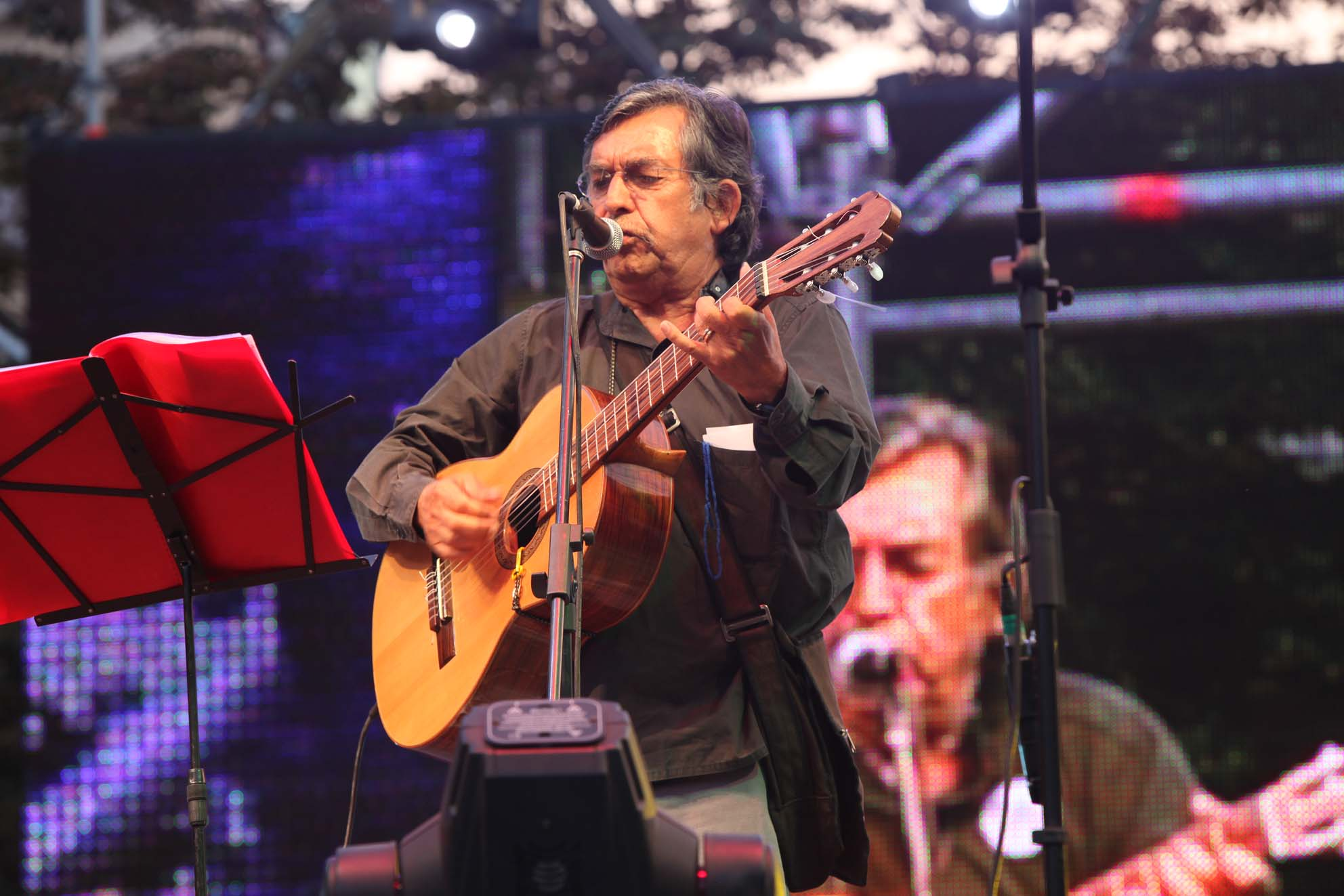
Ángel Parra

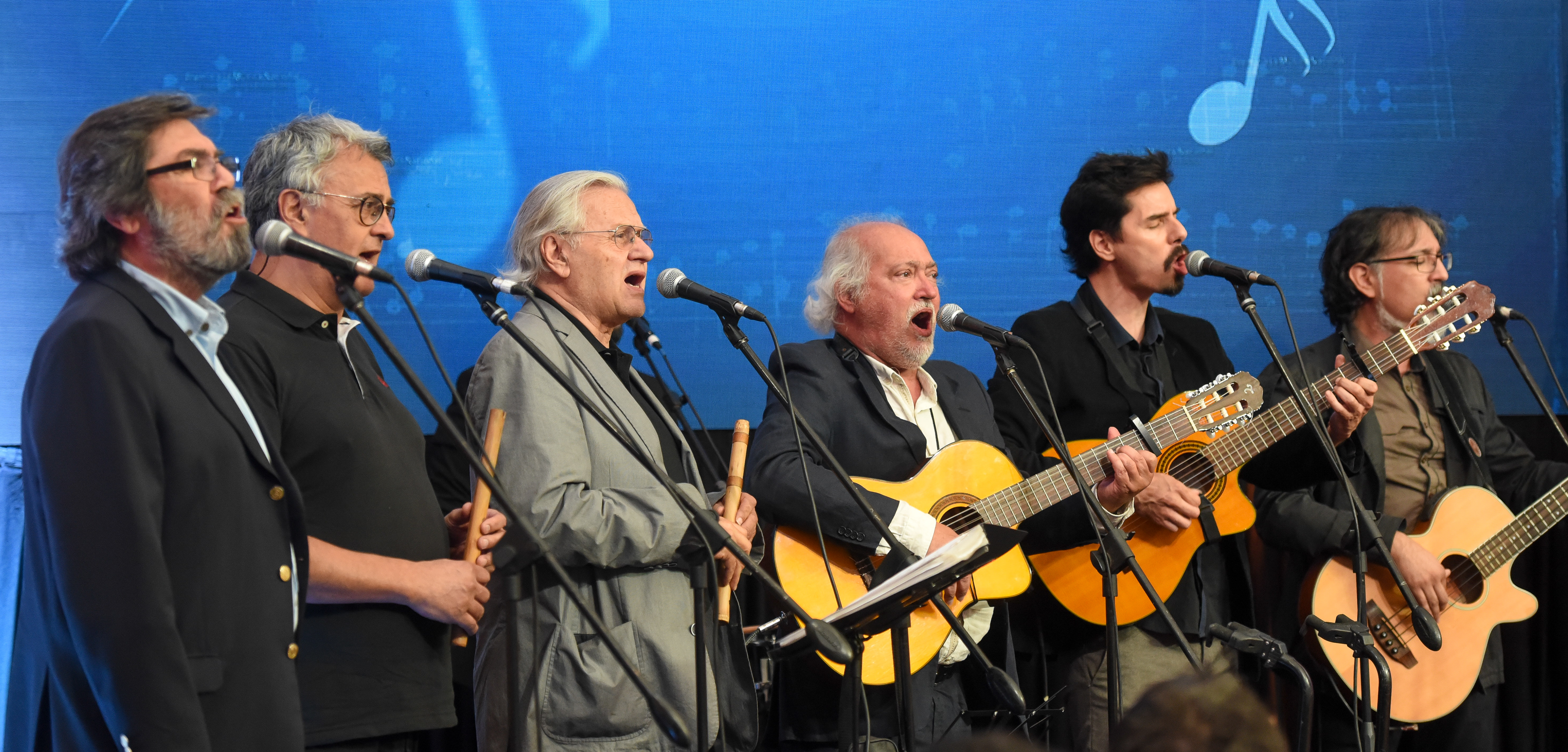
Quilapayún

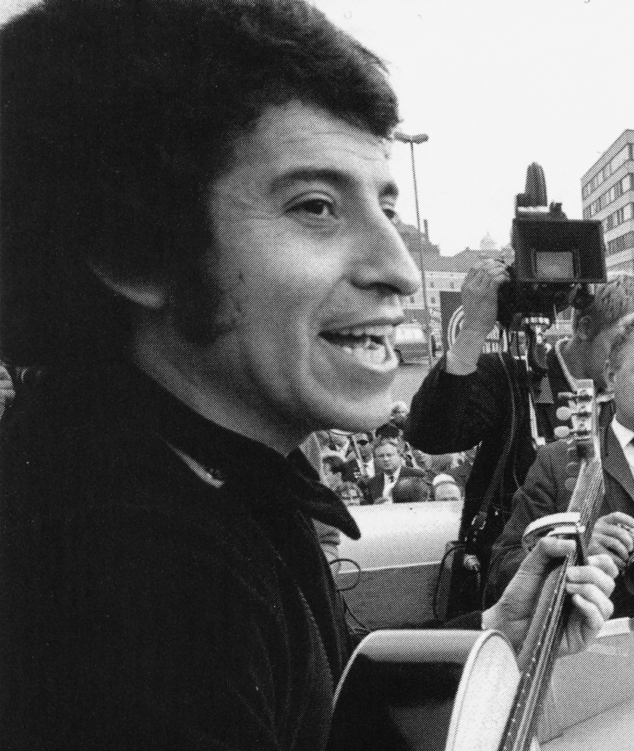
Victor Jara

Rejection of foreign influence on Chilean culture, particularly US culture, further stimulated the movement as it sought to create a sense of Chilean national identity. At the inaugural Festival de la Nueva Canción Chilena (Festival of the Chilean New Song) in 1969 in Santiago - the first time the movement was so named - Universidad Catolica rector Fernando Castillo said:

“Perhaps popular song is the art that best defines a community. But lately in our country we are experiencing a reality that is not ours… Our purpose here today is to search for an expression that describes our reality… How many foreign singers come here and get us all stirred up, only to leave us emptier than ever when they leave? And isn’t it true that our radio and television programs seldom encourage the creativity of our artists… ? Let our fundamental concern be that our own art be deeply rooted in the Chilean spirit so that when we sing - be it badly or well - we express genuine happiness and pain, happiness and pain that are our own.”

The Chilean New Song also developed amidst a background of social upheaval taking place throughout Latin America. The Cuban Revolution and the Vietnam War provided inspiration for a growing number of musicians who aligned themselves politically with the socialist struggle. Examples of this include Víctor Jara's Zamba del Che in homage to Che Guevara and Rolando Alarcón's Por Cuba y Por Vietnam. Following Violeta Parra's death in 1967, Víctor Jara became one of the leading figures of the movement.

In Chile, the New Song came to actively support the presidential campaign of Salvador Allende. Folk singers of the movement wrote songs in support of Allende's Popular Unity coalition, playing at political rallies and becoming cultural beacons of the left.

The campaign hymn for Popular Unity, "Venceremos" (“we shall succeed”), written by Claudio Iturra and Sergio Ortega and performed by the band Inti-Illimani, contained lyrics urging the Chilean people to unite behind Allende's. Another key song in the movement, El pueblo unido jamas sera vencido (“the people united will never be defeated”), written by Quilapayún and Sergio Ortega, was also originally composed in support of Allende's electoral campaign and went on to become an internationally recognised song of protest.

The election of Salvador Allende as Chilean president in 1970 heralded a new phase for the New Song movement and themes became less tied to a particular political cause., In one of his final songs, Manifesto, Víctor Jara sung of the essence of the New Song:

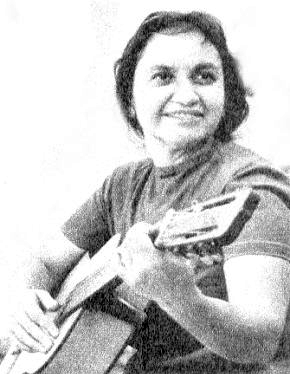
Violeta Parra portrait in the 1960

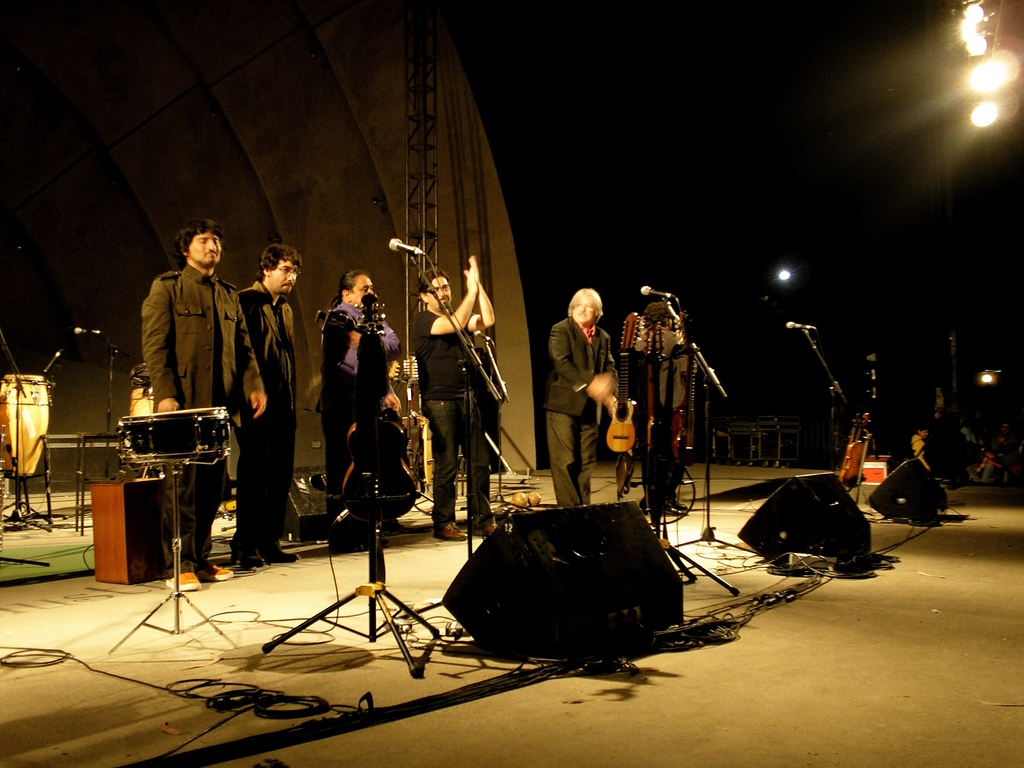
Inti-Illimani

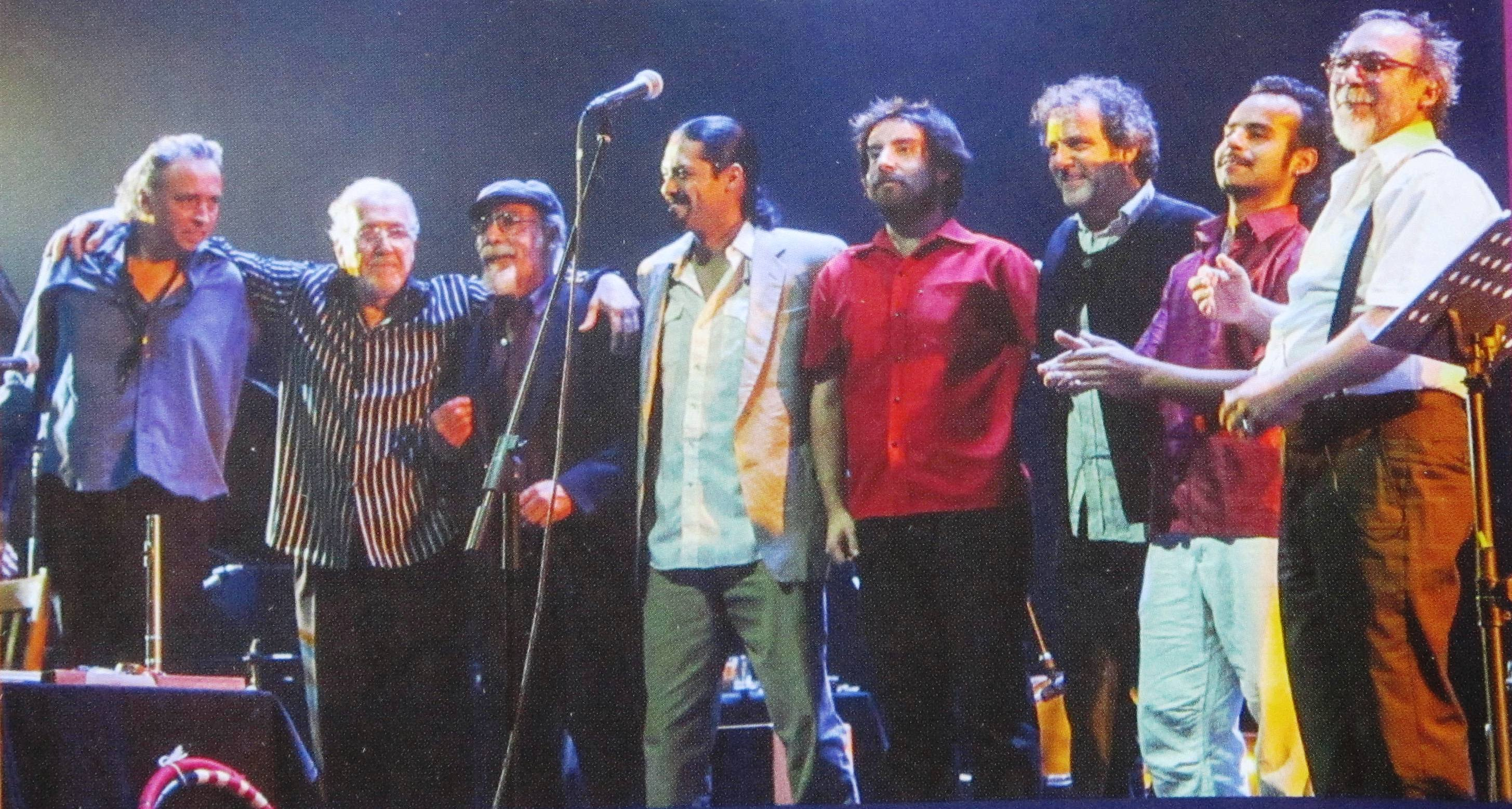
Congreso

My guitar is not for the rich
no, nothing like that.
My song is of the ladder
we are building to reach the stars.
For a song has meaning
when it beats in the veins
of a man who will die singing,
truthfully singing his song.

The 1973 military coup led by Augusto Pinochet marked the end of the Chilean New Song movement. Many of its proponents were captured and tortured and fled Chile in exile. In the days following the coup, Víctor Jara was taken to Chile Stadium (Estadio Chile now Estadio Víctor Jara), tortured and killed at the hands of the military regime. According to testimony, he was tortured by soldiers who broke his hands and taunted him saying “sing now, if you can, bastard”; Jara reportedly responded by singing a verse of Venceremos and was subsequently taken away and killed. Jara's final work was a poem without a title, commonly named Estadio Chile, wherein he wrote of the conditions of those captured by the military junta:

How hard it is to sing
when I must sing of horror.
Horror which I am living,
horror which I am dying.
To see myself among so much
and so many moments of infinity
in which silence and screams
are the end of my song.

From foreign shores, a number of New Song musicians including Angel Parra, Patricio Manns and bands Inti-Illimani and Quilapayun continued to perform in the New Song style.

== List of artists ==
- Luis Advis
- Rolando Alarcón
- Amerindios
- Francesca Ancarola
- Max Berrú
- Eduardo Carrasco
- Patricio Castillo
- Congreso
- Illapu
- Inti-Illimani
- Los Jaivas
- Víctor Jara
- Margot Loyola
- Patricio Manns
- Eduardo Moubarak
- Julio Numhauser
- Guillermo "Willy" Oddó
- Sergio Ortega
- Rodolfo Parada
- Ángel Parra
- Isabel Parra
- Violeta Parra
- Quilapayún
- Horacio Salinas
- Santiago del Nuevo Extremo
- Silvia Urbina

== See also ==
- Chilean rock
- Music of Chile
- Nueva canción
- Peña (music)
- Violeta Parra
