= Peña (music) =

A peña is a meeting place or grouping of musicians or artists, either in Spain (where it is known as peña flamenca) or in various South American countries. In Chile in particular, the term came to mean a cheap, popular venue where folk music was played and simple food and drink were available, usually in the form of Nueva Canción, the kind of music popularised by musicians such as Violeta Parra and Victor Jara in the 1960s and early 1970s

Because of its association with the Unidad Popular Government of Salvador Allende, the concept of a Peña is often associated with social justice and grassroots culture.
