= The People United Will Never Be Defeated! =

Composition by Frederic Rzewski

The People United Will Never Be Defeated! (1975) is a piano composition by American composer Frederic Rzewski. The People United is a set of 36 variations on the Chilean song "¡El pueblo unido jamás será vencido!" by Sergio Ortega and Quilapayún, and received its world premiere on February 7, 1976, played by Ursula Oppens as part of the Bi-Centennial Piano Series at the John F. Kennedy Center for the Performing Arts Concert Hall. Rzewski dedicated the composition to Oppens, who had commissioned it and who recorded it in 1979; her recording was named "Record of the Year" in that year by Record World and received a Grammy Award nomination.

== Analysis ==
The song on which the variations is based is one of many that emerged from the Unidad Popular coalition in Chile between 1969 and 1973, prior to the overthrow of the Salvador Allende government. Rzewski composed the variations in September and October 1975, as a tribute to the struggle of the Chilean people against the newly imposed repressive regime of Augusto Pinochet; indeed the work contains allusions to other leftist struggles of the same and immediately preceding time, such as quotations from the Italian traditional socialist song "Bandiera Rossa" and the Bertolt Brecht/Hanns Eisler "Solidarity Song".

In general, the variations are short, and build up to climaxes of considerable force. The 36 variations, following the 36 bars of the tune, are in six groups of six. The pianist, in addition to needing a virtuoso technique, is required to whistle, slam the piano lid, and catch the after-vibrations of a loud attack as harmonics: all of these are "extended" techniques in 20th-century piano writing. Much of the work uses the language of 19th-century romanticism, but mixes this language with pandiatonic tonality, modal writing, and serial techniques. A typical performance spans roughly 60 minutes.

As in the Goldberg Variations by Johann Sebastian Bach, the final variation is a direct restatement of the original theme, intended to be heard with new significance after the long journey through the variations.

== Orchestration ==
From March 12-17th, 2026, the New York Philharmonic premiered an orchestral version under Gustavo Dudamel, celebrating the 250th Anniversary of the United States. The 18 composers involved in the project (in order) were Andrew Norman, Roberto Sierra, Nina Shekhar, Nina C. Young, Joel Thompson, Maria Schneider, Conrad Tao, Kati Agócs, Brittany J. Green, Arturo Márquez, Tania León, Suzanne Farrin, Enrico Chapela, Felipe Lara, Anthony Cheung, Marcos Balter, Wang Lu, and Jerod Impichchaachaaha' Tate.

== Recordings ==
- Frederic Rzewski (composer and piano), The People United Will Never Be Defeated!, recorded 1986, published 1990 by Hat Hut Records, Switzerland, hat ART CD 6066.
- Frederic Rzewski (composer and piano), The People United Will Never Be Defeated!, in Piano Works, 1975–1999, published 2002, Nonesuch Records 79623–2.
- Frederic Rzewski, The People United Will Never Be Defeated, 36 Variations on a Chilean Song. Ursula Oppens, piano. Vanguard Classics CD, OVC 8056.
- Frederic Rzewski, The People United Will Never Be Defeated, 36 Variations on a Chilean Song. Marc-André Hamelin, Hyperion Records CDA67077 (Gramophone Editor's Choice).
- Frederic Rzewski, The People United Will Never Be Defeated, 36 Variations on a Chilean Song. Stephen Drury, piano. New Albion NA063.
- Frederic Rzewski Plays Rzewski VAI DVD 4440, Video recording from the 2007 Miami International Piano Festival
- Frederic Rzewski, The People United Will Never Be Defeated, 36 Variations on "¡El pueblo unido jamás será vencido!". Kai Schumacher, piano. Wergo WER67302. (fono forum magazine, pick of the month)
- Frederic Rzewski, The People United Will Never Be Defeated, 36 Variations on a Chilean Song. Ralph van Raat, piano. Naxos 8.559360.
- Frederic Rzewski, The People United Will Never Be Defeated, 36 Variations on a Chilean Song. Thomas Schultz, piano. Wooden Fish Recordings (no number).
- Frederic Rzewski, The People United Will Never Be Defeated, 36 Variations on a Chilean Song. Yuji Takahashi, piano. ALM ALCD-19.
- Frederic Rzewski, The People United Will Never Be Defeated. Christopher Hinterhuber, piano. paladino music pmr 0037 (2012)
- Frederic Rzewski, The People United Will Never Be Defeated!. Corey Hamm, piano. Redshift Records TK431 (2014) (2014 Spotify Best Classical Record, and Best Classical Recording of 2014 Western Canada Music Awards)
- Frederic Rzewski, The People United Will Never Be Defeated!, Four Hands. Ursula Oppens, piano. Çedille Records: CDR 90000 158 (2014)
- Frederic Rzewski, The People United Will Never Be Defeated!. Lee Sangwook, piano. Audioguy Classics ASIN B00JVDADWM (2014)
- Frederic Rzewski, The People United Will Never Be Defeated!. Igor Levit, piano. Sony Music ASIN B0128ZEVDG (2015)
- Frederic Rzewski, The People United Will Never Be Defeated!. Daan Vandewalle, piano. Etcetera Records: KTC 1589, 8711801015897 (2017)
- Frederic Rzewski, The People United Will Never Be Defeated!. Michael Noble, piano. 198004840682 (2022)
- Frederic Rzewski, The People United Will Never Be Defeated!. Vadym Kholodenko, piano. Quartz, QTZ2149 (2022)
- Frederic Rzewski, THE PEOPLE UNITED Kevin Lee Sun, piano. Navona, NV6654 (2024)
- Frederic Rzewski, The People United Will Never Be Defeated! Heather O'Donnell, piano; filmed performance incorporating images from protest movements YouTube

== See also ==
- List of socialist songs
- List of variations on a theme by another composer
