= Cien Sonetos de Amor =

Collection of sonnets by Pablo Neruda

100 Love Sonnets
- First edition
- Author: Pablo Neruda
- Original title: Cien sonetos de amor
- Translator: Stephen Tapscott
- Language: Spanish
- Series: Latin American Literature and Culture
- Genre: Poetry
- Publisher: Editorial Losada
- Publication date: 1959
- Publication place: Argentina
- Media type: Print (Paperback)
- Pages: 124

Cien sonetos de amor ("100 Love Sonnets") is a collection of sonnets written by the Chilean poet and Nobel Laureate Pablo Neruda originally published in Argentina in 1959. Dedicated to Matilde Urrutia, later his third wife, it is divided into the four stages of the day: morning, afternoon, evening, and night.

The sonnets have been translated into English numerous times by various scholars. The most widely acclaimed English translation was made by Stephen Tapscott and published in 1986. In 2004, Gustavo Escobedo translated the 100 sonnets for the 100th anniversary of Neruda’s birth.

== Sonnet VI ==
Lost in the forest, I broke off a dark twig
and lifted its whisper to my thirsty lips:
maybe it was the voice of the rain crying,
a cracked bell, or a torn heart.

Something from far off: it seemed
deep and secret to me, hidden by the earth,
a shout muffled by huge autumns,
by the moist half-open darkness of the leaves.

Wakening from the dreaming forest there, the hazel-sprig
sang under my tongue, its drifting fragrance
climbed up through my conscious mind

as if suddenly the roots I had left behind
cried out to me, the land I had lost with my childhood—
and I stopped, wounded by the wandering scent.

– Translated by Stephen Tapscott

== In popular culture ==
- In Tom Shadyac's 1998 movie Patch Adams, Sonnet XVII is used in different stages of the film, most notably in the climatic funeral scene.
- Sonnet XII is referenced in the 2002 Deepa Mehta film Bollywood/Hollywood when Rahul first meets Sue/Sunita in the bar, and later when he recites the poem in order to win the heroine in a Romeo and Juliet-esque balcony scene.
- Sonnet XXVII is recited and referenced in "The Naked Man" episode in the 4th series of How I Met Your Mother.
- Sonnet XVII is referenced in the 2020 Chemical Hearts movie
