= Tito Fernández =

Chilean singer-songwriter (1942–2023)

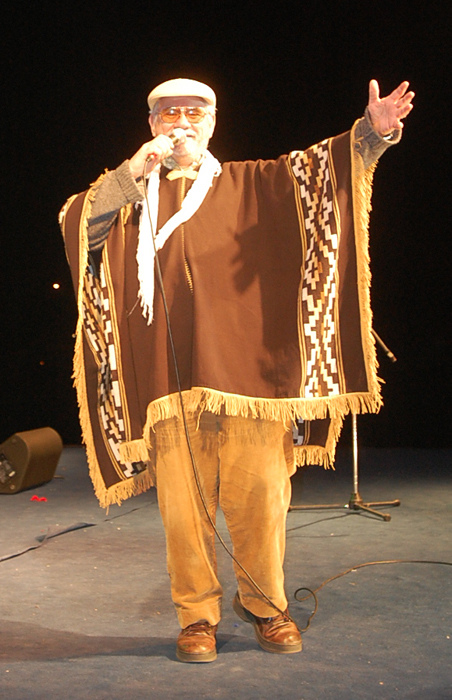

Background information
- Birth name: Humberto Waldemar Asdrúbal Baeza Fernández
- Born: 9 December 1942; Temuco, Chile
- Origin: Chile
- Died: 11 February 2023 (aged 80); Puerto Montt, Chile
- Occupation(s): Singer, songwriter

Humberto Waldemar Asdrúbal Baeza Fernández (9 December 1942 – 11 February 2023), also known as Tito Fernández, El Temucano, was a Chilean singer-songwriter and folklorist. He recorded and released more than 40 albums from the 1970s to the present.

Fernández was born in Temuco but moved to Santiago as a teenager. In his 20s, he began singing in pubs and bars in the north of Chile, Peru, and Bolivia. He was imprisoned during the battle between the Bolivian army and Che Guevara's guerrillas.

Fernández returned to Chile in 1971. He moved to Santiago where he recorded his music and shared the stage several times with Víctor Jara. He was also active with the Juventudes Comunistas de Chile. However, unlike other singers of the Nueva Canción Chilena, Fernández also had followers within the military and right-wing.

After the military coup in 1973, he was assigned to deliver Victor Jara's wedding ring to his widow. Fernández was himself detained by the military after the coup and imprisoned for a short time at the Escuela de Aviación, where he had studied in his youth. He was given the work of being a waiter serving military personnel at the school. He was released after a short time and remained in Chile rather than living in exile. However, he was not permitted to perform live, and his more left-wing albums were censored.

Over the years, he became close to members of the Central Nacional de Informaciones (CNI). This led to disagreements with artists of the Nueva Canción Chilena who no longer considered him to be part of their musical movement.

Fernández claimed to have had an encounter with UFOs on a highway while traveling to Antofagasta in 1974. In 1988, he founded the Centro Integral de Estudios Metafísicos (CIEM). In 2018, a member of CIEM accused Fernández of raping her. He was charged with rape in July 2020.

== Awards and honours ==
- Premio APES 1973
- Premio Alerce 1977
- Premio Alerce 1978
- Hijo Ilustre de la Ciudad de Temuco (1991)
- Hijo Ilustre de la Comuna Lo Espejo (1993)
- Homenaje del Congreso Nacional de Chile (19 de junio de 1996)
- Festival de Viña del Mar 1997: primer premio en música de raíz folclórica con la canción Cartagena, de Claudio Guzmán
- Triple Disco de Platino en 1999, ARCI-MUSIC, por ventas de Los 20 mejores
- Premio APES 2000
- Gaviota de Oro en el Festival de Viña del Mar 2001
- Premio Altazor 2001, categoría Música tradicional o de raíz floclórica por 40 años del cantor popular
- Premio a la Música Presidente de la República 2001
- Disco de Platino en 2002, Doble M - Warner, por ventas de 40 años del cantor popular
- Distinción del Club de Huasos Gil Letelier 2002
- Antorcha de Plata en el Festival de Viña del Mar 2003
- Antorchas y Gaviotas de Plata y Oro en el Festival de Viña del Mar 2004
- Hijo Ilustre de la Municipalidad de Temuco (2004)
- Disco de Oro en 2004, Doble M - Warner, por producción de 40 años del cantor popular. Segunda parte
- Gran Pionero de la Cuenca de Baker (2005, Municipalidad de la ciudad de Cochrane)
- Figura Fundamental de la Música Chilena (2010, Sociedad Chilena del Derecho de Autor)

== Books ==
- Páginas de mi diario, libro autobiográfico
- El mensaje inicial, autoayuda, Editorial Minks, 1996
- El mensaje de Siro, autoayuda
- El mensaje terrestre, autoayuda
- Antología poética, Sociedad del Derecho de Autor, 2003
- Los versos numerados, autobiografía en verso, Ril Editores, 2012

== Discography ==
- 1971 - El Temucano
- 1971 - Tito Fernández, el Temucano
- 1972 - Al amor
- 1973 - Boleros
- 1974 - Tito Fernández
- 1974 - Entre nos
- 1975 - Me gusta el vino
- 1975? - Seis canciones y un cuento
- 1976? - De chincol a jote
- 1976? - Profeta en mi tierra
- 1976? - Somos (con Patricia Chávez)
- 1978 - Con amor de hombre
- 1978 - Todo lo que tengo es mi ciudad
- 1978? - Chile
- 1978? - En la senda internacional
- 1981 - El caminero Mendoza
- 1982 - Y sigo siendo chileno
- 1983 - La ciudad
- 1984 - Más chileno que nunca
- 1985 - Yo paso y canto
- 1985 - Mañana me voy de viaje
- 1986 - Así es la cosa
- 1987 - El canto del Temucano
- 1988 - Verónica y Tito Fernández
- 1989 - Cuartetas divertidas
- 198X - Tito Fernández y Patty Chávez (con Patricia Chávez)
- 1990 - Yo vengo cantando, hermano
- 1992 - Lota
- 1992 - ¡Viva Chile, mierda!
- 1993 - Reflexiones y otras cosas
- 1994 - A mis compañeros
- 1995 - Dios los cría y el canto los junta (con Carlos Vásquez)
- 1996 - A todo bolero (con Lu Rivera)
- 1997 - Suélteme la manga
- 1997 - Mis ciudades
- 1998 - El atrinque
- 1999 - El humor de Tito Fernández
- 2000 - Boleros
- 2000 - Cantan al amor
- 2001 - El enamorado
- 2002 - El caminero Mendoza
- 2003 - 40 años del cantor popular, vol. 1 y 2
- 2003 - El asa'o
- 2005 - Por amor al bolero (con Lu Rivera)
- 2005 - Tito Fernández & Las Voces Nuevas. 35 años después
- 2005 - Nuestra Navidad chilena
- 2005 - La fonda de El Temucano
- 2006 - Tonada y tradición
- Epopeya de las comidas y bebidas de Chile
- Nosotros los cantores
- Tito Fernández el Temucano en vivo
- El humor del Temucano en vivo
- Lo mejor de mi tierra
- 200 años Chile y su floclore
- 50 años de canto 200 historias
- Los versos numerados

=== Singles ===
- Yo soy uno de aquellos / Un vals para Jazmín
- Me gusta el vino / Niña (ALBA)
- Tonada de las comidas / Cuando yo sea grande (ALBA)
- Todo lo que tengo es mi ciudad / Como cada día (RCA)
- 1972 - Polka / Cero a cero
- 1972 - El presupuesto / A ti
- 1973 - Benaiga la buena suerte / El huacho Jacinto
- 1973 - De algunas señoras / Pum-pum te maté

=== Collaborations ===
- 1973 - Primer festival internacional de la canción popular
- 198? - Chile ríe y canta (álbum)|Chile ríe y canta
