= Julio Numhauser =

- Born: 1939 (age 86–87); Santiago
- Origin: Chile
- Genres: Folk, Nueva Canción, Chilean music
- Instruments: Vocal, Guitar
- Years active: Since 1965

Julio Numhauser is a Chilean musician of the Nueva Canción-movement. He founded the folk music group Quilapayún in 1965 together with the brothers, Julio Carrasco and Eduardo Carrasco, where he stayed until 1967. 1968 he founded the folk music group, Amerindios, together with Mario Salazar. In 1980 he founded the group Somos with Francisco Ibarra and Oscar Salazar.

Numhauser left Chile in 1973 due to the dictatorship of Augusto Pinochet. In 1975 he moved to Sweden, where he still lives today. In 2000 he was chosen to be the cultural attaché of the Chilean embassy in Sweden by the Chilean president Ricardo Lagos.

== Discography ==
=== With Quilapayún ===
- 1967 – Quilapayún

=== With Amerindios ===
- 1970 – Amerindios
- 1973 – Tu grito es mi canto
- 1978 – Alejado de ti... pero contigo

=== Solo albums ===
- 1982 – Todo cambia
- 1984 – Somos PAX
- 1989 – A Chile con todo el amor (CBS)
- 1997 – Nuevos caminos
- 2001 – Antología (Warner Music)

=== Collections ===
- 2003 – Nueva Canción Chilena. Antología definitiva
