= El pueblo unido jamás será vencido =

Chilean protest song

- Cover of the 7" vinyl release

Single by Quilapayún

from the album El Pueblo Unido Jamás Será Vencido
- Language: Spanish
- B-side: "Chacarilla"
- Released: 1975
- Label: Movieplay
- Composer: Sergio Ortega
- Lyricist: Quilapayún

"¡El pueblo unido jamás será vencido!" (Latin American Spanish: [el ˈpweβlo uˈniðo xaˈmas seˈɾa βenˈsiðo]; English: "The people united will never be defeated") is a Chilean protest song, whose music was composed by Sergio Ortega Alvarado and the text written in conjunction with the band Quilapayún. Together with the song "Venceremos", also by Ortega, it is one of the most successful songs of the Nueva canción chilena (New Chilean Song) movement. The theme has a marching rhythm, highlighting its chorus, which is a shout or slogan with only percussion. The song has been used in various protests around the world, most of which have no direct connection to the Chilean coup or Latin America. The lyrics have been adapted or translated into many languages.

== Composition and recording ==
The title of the song was taken from a speech by Colombian political leader Jorge Eliécer Gaitán in the 1940s. The phrase was later adopted by Popular Unity protesters during the socialist government of Chilean President Salvador Allende in the early 1970s. According to Sergio Ortega Alvarado, he composed the song after hearing a young man shout the phrase while he was walking home in Santiago in June 1973. The song was recorded for the first time in Chile in 1973 during a massive Quilapayún concert in the Alameda, Santiago, three months before Augusto Pinochet's coup d'état that overthrew Allende and began the period of military dictatorship. Shortly before the concert, Allende had appointed Sergio Ortega Alvarado as Cultural Ambassador of the Popular Unity government, a position he briefly shared with Víctor Jara, who was assassinated days after the coup.

From then on and during the following years, the song appeared on numerous albums by different bands and singer-songwriters, but mainly by Quilapayún and Inti-Illimani, who had to live in exile throughout the dictatorship period, in France and Italy, respectively, where they continued their musical careers until their return to Chile, after the dictatorship ended more than fifteen years later.

The first official release in which the song appeared was during June 1973, in the live album of various performers Primer festival internacional de la canción popular published by the DICAP label, in which they participated, in addition to Quilapayún closing the album with "El pueblo unido..." and "Las ollitas", other renowned exponents such as Inti-Illimani, César Isella, Isabel Parra, Tito Fernández and Alfredo Zitarrosa.

== Versions ==
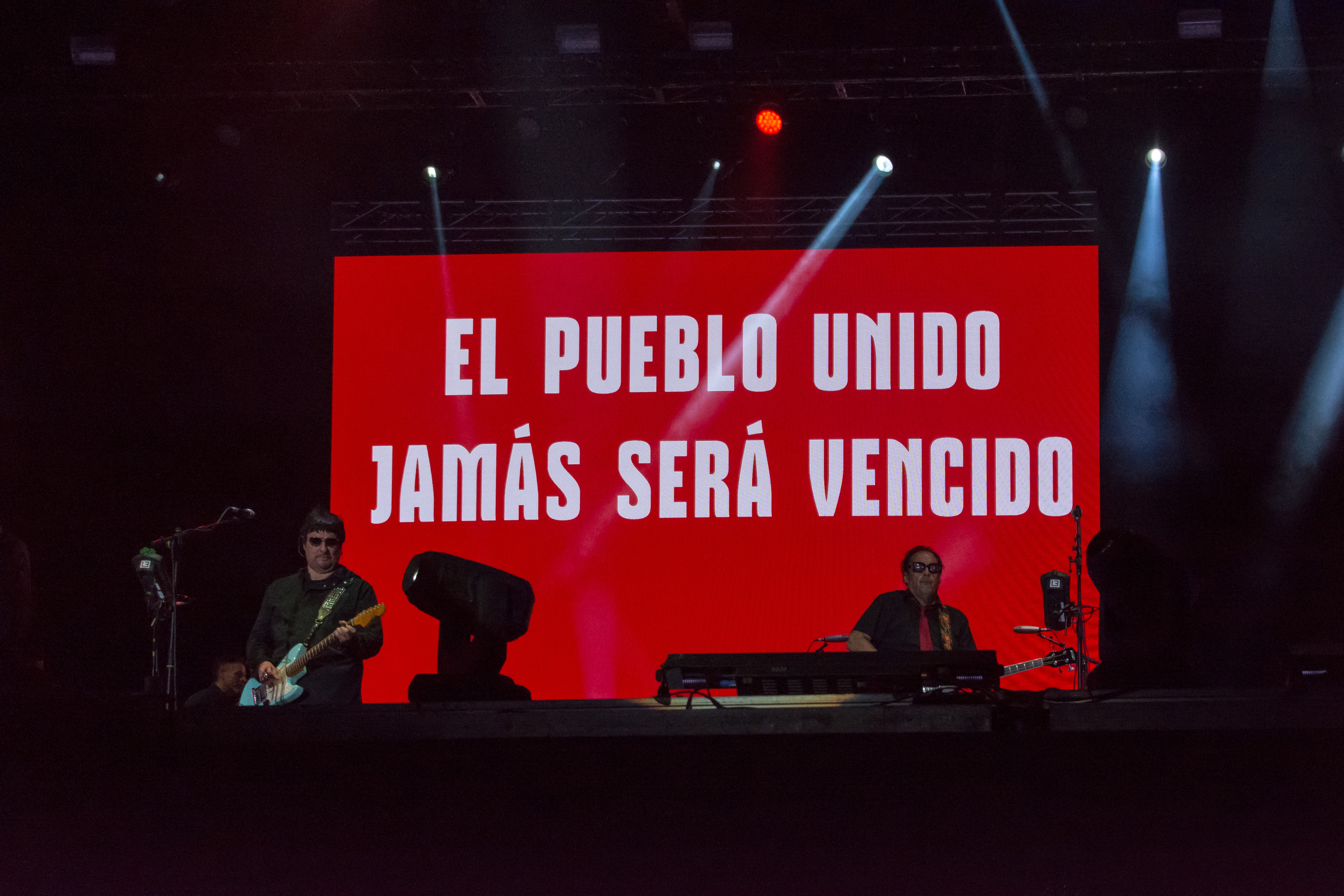
Chilean rock band Los Tres performing the song.

Due to its revolutionary theme, ease of interpretation in different languages, and ability to transcend political affiliation, this song has numerous versions, corresponding to different eras and musical styles.

In 1975, the American pianist Frederic Rzewski composed The People United Will Never Be Defeated!, a set of 36 piano variations on this theme. The work has been recorded numerous times.

"Barpakhiz"
Iranian protest song that uses the same melody

In Iran, the melody was used for a revolutionary song with Persian lyrics, titled "Barpakhiz" ("Arise" in English), with encore "Barpakhiz, az ja kan, banaye kakh-e doshman" ("Arise, demolish the foundations of the enemy's palace!") by leftist revolutionaries during the Islamic Revolution against the monarchy in 1979. The song experienced a popular revival with the Iranian Green revolution as a rally and protest song.

In the Philippines, the song was loosely translated by the progressive band Patatag for their song "Awit ng Tagumpay" ("Song of Victory") with its Tagalog encore "Tibayin ang hanay, Gapiin ang Kaaway!" (Strengthen the ranks, destroy the oppressors). It is sung during demonstrations. The Bagong Alyansang Makabayan also used its loosely Tagalog translation of the title as its motto: "Ang tao, ang bayan, ngayon ay lumalaban!"

In 1977, German folk singer Hannes Wader released the song "El pueblo unido" on the live album Hannes Wader singt Arbeiterlieder recorded at a folk festival organized by the German Communist Party newspaper Unsere Zeit. In 1978, the Italian singer and composer Gianfranco Molle released the album Horo da opozicio with an Esperanto version of the song translated by Renato Corsetti.

In 1979, "The People United Will Never Be Defeated!" was chanted at the White Night riots after the sentencing of former San Francisco supervisor Dan White in the murders of George Moscone and Harvey Milk. In 1982, American bassist Charlie Haden recorded a version with Carla Bley and the Liberation Music Orchestra on the album Ballad of the Fallen which was voted top jazz album of the year in Downbeat's 1984 critics' poll. In 1983, during the "Resistance March" (Marcha de la resistencia) in Argentina, the song was revived with the lyrics Ahora! Ahora! Resulta indispensable! Aparición con vida y castigo a los culpables ("Now! Now! It's essential that they return the disappeared, and that the guilty be punished"). The song was still being sung in the 2000s in Argentina with the disappearance of Julio Lopez.

In 1998, the British electronic music trio Dario G used the phrase in the song "Revolution". In 2002, Russian singer Garik Sukachov used the phrase in his song "Svobodu Andzhele Devis" ("freedom for Angela Davis"), and the Spanish group Ska-P released the song "Estampida", which included lyrics inspired by the original, on their album ¡¡Que corra la voz!!. The following year, American punk rock band Anti-Flag used the English translation "the people united will never be defeated" as chorus in "One People, One Struggle" on their album The Terror State.

In 1999, the left-wing Turkish artist Mehmet Celal released his own version of the song in Turkish on his album Fırtınadan Önce (Before the storm). His album covers a wide variety of communist movements including Latin American communism, such as "Bolivyalı Küçük Asker" (Little Bolivian Soldier), which tells the story of a soldier who has been ordered to murder Argentinian revolutionary Che Guevara.

In 2004, Ukrainian rap band GreenJolly paraphrased this song to create "Razom nas bahato" (Together We Are Many) during the first days of Orange Revolution. This song was the Ukraine's entry at the 2005 Eurovision Song Contest. In 2007, during the Greek general elections, the song was used during the main campaign of the left party Syriza (Coalition of the Radical Left) and it figured on the party's televised message. In 2008, Thievery Corporation released "El pueblo unido" on the album Radio Retaliation, which is based on this quote. In the protests in Tunis in 2010 and 2011 that led to the ousting of president Ben Ali, protesters chanted on the same rhythm the phrase "الشعب يريد إسقاط النظام" (Ash-shab yurid isqat an-nizam) which translates to "The people want the regime down". The same phrase was chanted for the first time in Tahrir Square in Egypt on 25 January 2011 in what turned into massive protests that lead to the ousting of president Hosni Mubarak. Eventually, the protest slogan became the unofficial slogan of protesters throughout the Arab Spring.

The 2012 Flobots album The Circle in the Square's titular track uses this line in its lyrics. The 2013 song "Control" by Big Sean featuring Kendrick Lamar and Jay Electronica samples the recording by Sergio Ortega and Quilapayún. In 2014, during the Sunflower Student Movement in Taiwan, this song was translated to Chinese as "團結的人民永遠不被擊潰" by Huáng Sī-nóng and Jiăng Tāo. The 2015 song El Pueblo Unido by Austrian ska-punk band Russkaja uses the line from original song in the chorus. During the 2019–2020 Hong Kong protests, the Cantonese version of the song was played by Hong Kong protesters.

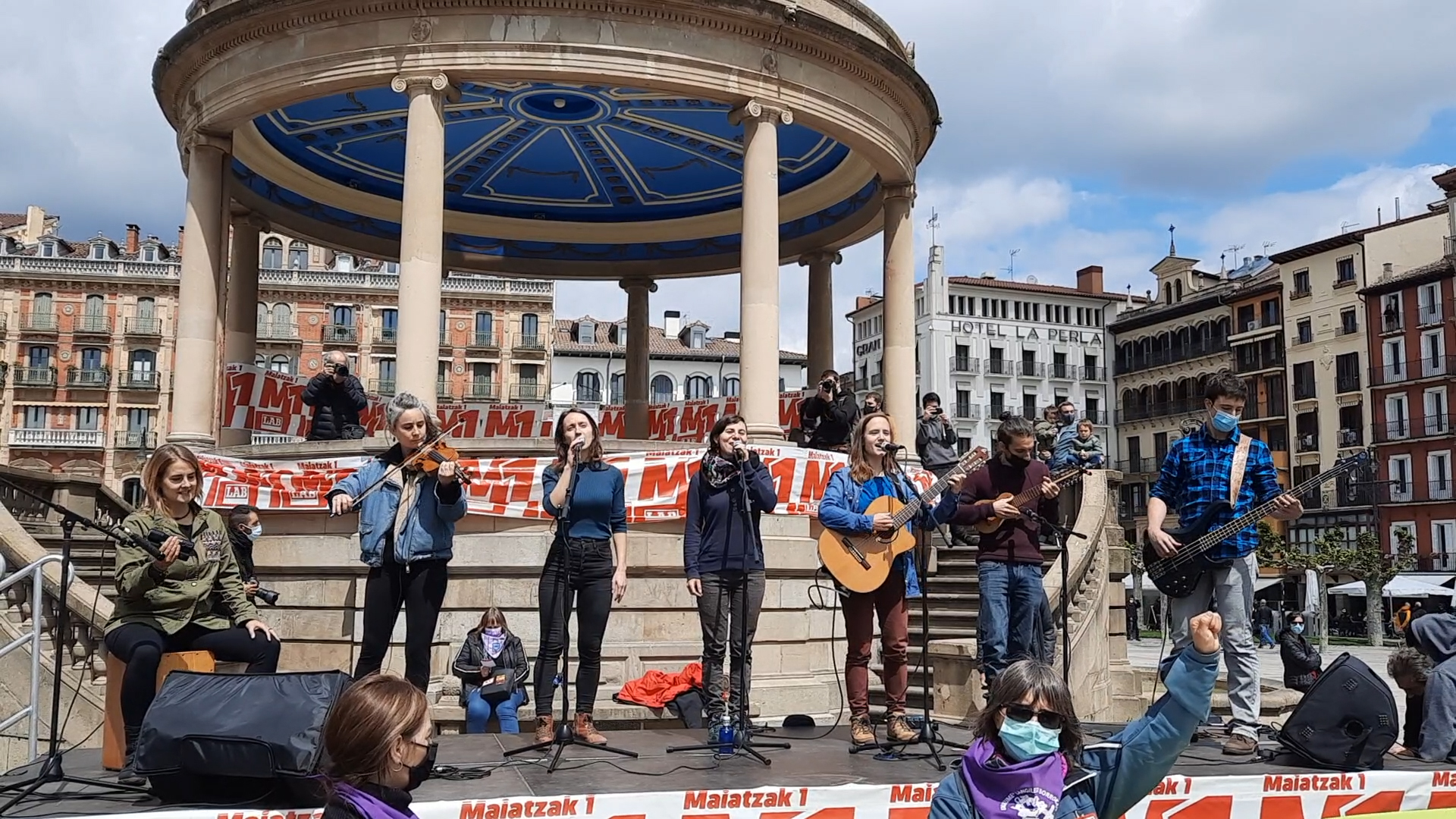
Music group, Andreina Jolin sings the Basque version of the song at the Plaza del Castillo in Pamplona, at the event of the First May of the LAB union.

During the 2019–20 Latin American protests, which originally began in Chile, the slogan became a resistance motto for protesters in Honduras, Argentina, Bolivia, Guatemala, Colombia, Mexico, Ecuador, Paraguay, Nicaragua, Peru, Haiti, El Salvador, Brazil ("O povo unido jamais será vencido"), and Venezuela calling to end the corruption of governments and caudillism. That same year, British-Iraqi rapper Lowkey used the phrase in his song “McDonald Trump”. In 2022, the rapper Linqua Franqa used the phrase in their song "Wurk". In 2022, Turkish-Kurdish music band Geniş Merdiven ("Wide Staircase") taking its name from Mikis Theodorakis's song "O Antonis" from his Mauthausen Trilogy made an adapted translation into Turkish and began to sing it in concerts with an interlude in Spanish. Venezuelan President Nicolás Maduro quoted the song, and the title of the song is an unofficial motto of the United Socialist Party of Venezuela.

== See also ==
- List of socialist songs
