= Quilapayún =

Chilean folk music group

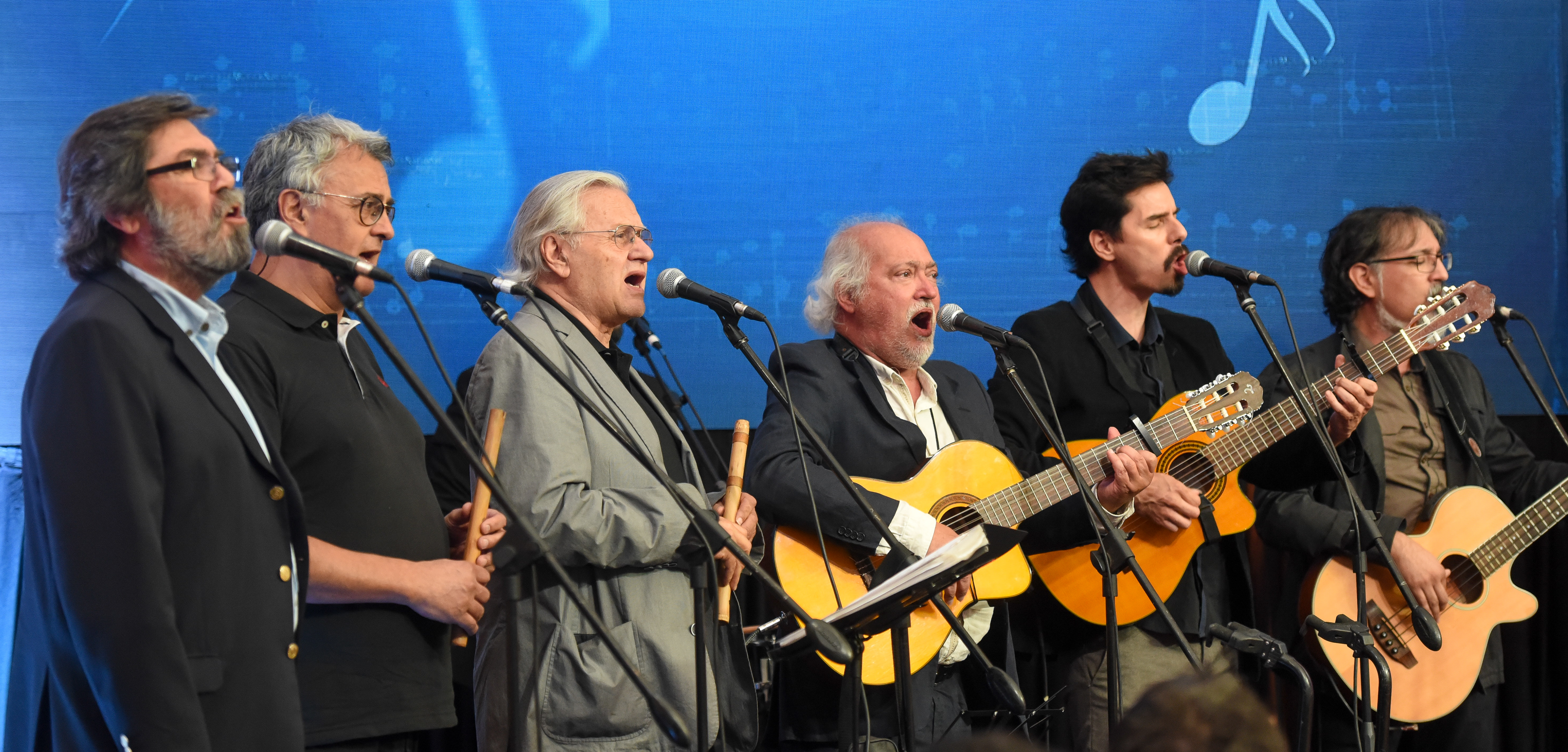
- Quilapayún in 2017

Background information
- Origin: Santiago, Chile
- Genre: Nueva Canción Chilena
- Years active: 1965–present
- Labels: EMI-Odeon, Picap, Warner Music
- Spinoffs: Inti+Quila
- Members: Principal members: Eduardo Carrasco; Rodolfo Parada; Guillermo Oddó (b. 1943-d.1991); Patricio Castillo; Carlos Quezada; Hugo Lagos; Hernán Gomez; Patricio Wang; Ruben Escudero; Other members: Julio Numhauser; Julio Carrasco; Guillermo García; Ricardo Venegas; Sebastian Quezada; Ismael Oddó; Alvaro Pinto; Chañaral Ortega; Sergio Arriagada; Mario Contreras
- Website: Quilapayún

Quilapayún (Spanish pronunciation: [kilapaˈʝun]) are a folk music group from Chile and among the longest lasting and most influential ambassadors of the Nueva Canción Chilena movement and genre. Formed during the mid-1960s, the group became inseparable with the revolution that occurred in the popular music of the country under the Popular Unity Government of Salvador Allende.

Since its formation and during its forty-year history – both in Chile and during its lengthy period of exile in France – the group has seen modifications to its personnel lineup and the subject and content of its work. Controversy regarding irreconcilable differences with the current and former group directors led to the division into two distinctive Quilapayún ensembles; one in Chile (Quilapayún-Histórico) and one in France (Quilapayún-France).

== History ==
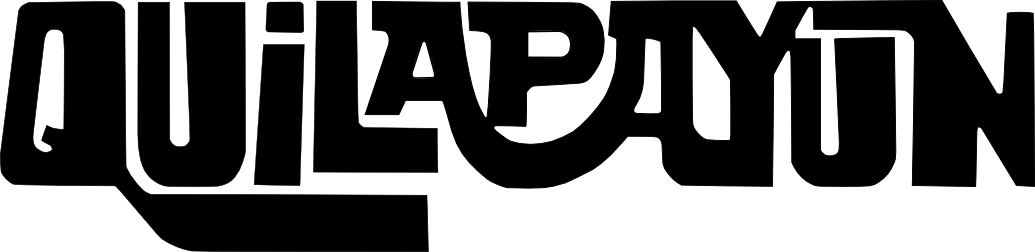
Official Quilapayún logo

Quilapayún originated in 1965 when Julio Numhauser and the brothers Julio and Eduardo Carrasco formed a folk music trio, which they simply called "the three bearded men" (viz. Quila-Payún) in the Mapuche language (viz. Mapudungun – the language of the people native to the region that is now the south of Chile, the Araucanians). Their first public performances were at the Universidad de Chile in Valparaíso, organized by their first musical director, Ángel Parra (son of Violeta Parra).

In 1966 the group won notice for its Andean music as well as the members' black ponchos, which became the group's trademark. During this time they won their first prize, La Guitarra de Oro (The Golden Guitar) in the Primer Festival Nacional del Folklore "Chile Múltiple" (First National Festival of Folklore). They also made their first recording, appearing on one song of Ángel Parra, "El Pueblo" ("The People").

At a 1966 performance in Valparaíso, the group met with Víctor Jara, with whom the group maintained a close and productive artistic association for many years. At the request of the group, Jara became Quilapayún's musical director and worked on the group's discipline and stage performances, and the style and content of the music. Jara presented them to the record label Odeon Records, where they recorded five LPs. Their first album, Quilapayún, was basically an Andean music album, but included songs of Ángel Parra, Víctor Jara and new compositions of Eduardo Carrasco such as "La Paloma" and "El canto del cuculi".

"Bourgeois society wants art to be another factor contributing to social alienation, we artists should transform it into a revolutionary weapon, until the contradiction that actually exists between art and society finally comes to pass.

"This surpassing is called revolution and its motor and fundamental agent is the working class. Our group, loyal to the ideals of Luis Emilio Recabarren, sees its work as a continuation of what has already been achieved by many other popular/folk artists.

"This side of the trenches has been occupied by artists whose names are forever linked to the revolutionary struggle of our people: the first Luis Emilio Recabarren, the latest: Violeta Parra and Pablo Neruda. The example they have given us is the light that guides us."

— Quilapayún (1969)

In 1967 Quilapayún recorded an album together with Víctor Jara, Canciones folklóricas de América (Folk Songs of America). During this time Julio Numhauser left the group over disputes over the group's style of music, and was replaced by Guillermo "Willy" Oddó. During 1967 they also toured the USSR, Italy, France and other parts of Europe, and recorded an LP with the Chilean painter and poet Juan Capra.

In 1968, Quilapayún participated in the launch of a new record label of La Jota (Chile's Communist Party Youth Organization). To the surprise of many commercial record labels, their LP X Vietnam, which included songs from the Spanish Revolution, became a nationwide success. This album established the group's thematic and aesthetics, and created great interest and a following among progressive youth. From the success of this album the label DICAP (Discoteca del Cantar Popular) appeared, which became the springboard of the Nueva Canción Chilena (New Chilean Song) movement. DICAP recorded up to 60 musical productions until the military coup of September 11, 1973, which banned and literally destroyed the record label.

During 1968 Julio Carrasco left the group for political differences, and was replaced by Hernan Gomez. At that time they performed at various universities, and made, with Victor Jara, their first two-hour show during two days in Santiago, which was a tremendous success.

In 1969 they recorded the Basta LP, which included an eclectic and highly political collection of songs from different parts of the world, establishing the fundamental element of the New Chilean Song: its Internationalism. This album was released with a lengthy statement by the group about the nature of their work and their commitment to the socialist cause. Rodolfo Parada joined the group at this time.

In 1969 they also appeared supporting Víctor Jara on his album, Pongo en tus manos abiertas (Into your open hands) in songs such as "A Cochabamba Me Voy", "El Martillo" and "Movil Oil Special". They also joined Jara at the Primer Festival de la Nueva Cancion Chilena (First Festival of the New Chilean Song), where they jointly interpreted "Plegaria a un Labrador" (Prayer to a Laborer), which won the festival award. After three years Víctor Jara and Quilapayún took different paths, and Eduardo Carrasco became the group's director.

Quilapayún was forced into exile in France after the right-wing military coup of 1973. The group settled in the city of Colombes, France, for more than 15 years. Their major works include Santa María de Iquique (1970), an album of spoken history, songs, and instrumentals about a notorious massacre in the city of Iquique, and the song "El pueblo unido jamás será vencido" ("The people, united, will never be defeated"), with lyrics by Quilapayún and music by famed Chilean songwriter and playwright Sergio Ortega.

== Split ==
Quilapayún's path has been marked by internal issues over the years, with some members leaving and others taking their place. In 1987 Willy Oddo, its most charismatic member, decided to leave France to be closer to Chile. He chose to live in Argentina. In October 1988, Pinochet was overthrown by a referendum. After 15 years of exile Quilapayun could return to Chile and performed tours in 1988, 1989, 1991 and 1992. In 1989 Eduardo Carrasco returned to Chile while most of the group continued to live in France and perform around the world. In November 1991 Willy Oddo was murdered by an offender in Santiago.

After Rodolfo Parada registered the name "Quilapayún" without the authorization of the other members, other historic members refused to continue with Parada and Wang, resulting in the group splitting into two, both claiming the name and legacy of Quilapayún, and leading to subsequent litigation. The Chile-based historic faction is celebrating the group's 40 year anniversary performing concerts in Chile, Latin America and Europe, together with the "historic" version of Inti-Illimani, another important Chilean group. These joint concerts have been advertised and promoted as Inti+Quila. The current "historic" lineup includes Eduardo Carrasco, Rubén Escudero, Ricardo Venegas, Guillermo García, Ismael Oddó (son of Guillermo "Willy" Oddó), Hugo Lagos, Hernán Gómez, Carlos Quezada and Sebastián Quezada (son of Carlos).

On December 5, 2007, the Court of Appeal of Paris forbade Parada and Wang's group "from making use of the name QUILAPAYÚN, subject to a fine of 10,000 euros per infringement". This judgement was confirmed by the Highest Court of Appeal (Cour de Cassation de Paris) on June 11, 2009. In 2015 the band's career reached its fiftieth year and both factions celebrated this anniversary. Parada's group performed three big shows at the end August in Santiago, together with other well-known Chilean artists while the "historic" faction made a big concert in front of Palacio de la Moneda in Santiago and announced several other anniversary concerts in Chile, Colombia and Spain on its website. In November 2015, the Chilean trademark conflict ended, since the Instituto Nacional de Patentes Industriales (INAPI), after a thirteen years process gave the exclusive right for using the mark "Quilapayun" to the group headed by Carrasco.

== Notable members ==
- Eduardo Carrasco: wind instruments (quena, pincuyo, zampoña etc.); voice: bass
- Carlos Quezada: percussion instruments, guitar; voice: tenor
- Guillermo "Willy" Oddó: guitar, percussion instruments; voice: baritenor (died in 1991)
- Hernán Gomez: guitar, charango; voice: bass-baritone.
- Hugo Lagos: string instruments, quena, zampoña; voice: baritone
- Guillermo García: guitar, percussion instruments; voice: baritone
- Ricardo Venegas Carhart: bass guitar, quena, baritone
- Victor Jara (murdered by Pinochet military, Sept. 16, 1973)

== Discography ==
=== Studio albums ===
- Quilapayún (1966)
- Canciones folklóricas de América (1967) (Quilapayún & Víctor Jara)
- X Vietnam (1968)
- Quilapayún Tres (1968)
- Basta (1969)
- Quilapayún Cuatro (1970)
- Cantata Santa María de Iquique (1970) (Quilapayún & Héctor Duvauchelle)
- Vivir como él (1971)
- Quilapayún Cinco (1972)
- La Fragua (1973) (text and music by Sergio Ortega)
- El pueblo unido jamás será vencido (Yhtenäistä Kansaa Ei Voi Koskaan Voittaa) (1974)
- El Pueblo Unido Jamás Será Vencido (1975)
- Adelante (1975)
- Patria (1976)
- La marche et le drapeau (1977)
- Hart voor Chili (various artists) (1977)
- Cantata Santa María de Iquique (Nueva versión) (1978) (Quilapayún & Jean-Louis Barrault)
- Umbral (1979)
- Darle al otoño un golpe de ventana... (1980)
- La revolución y las estrellas (1982)
- Tralalí Tralalá (1984)
- Survarío (1987)
- Los tres tiempos de América (1988) (Quilapayún + Paloma San Basilio)
- Latitudes (1992)
- Al horizonte (1999)
- Siempre (2007)
- Solistas (2009)
- Encuentros (2013)

=== Live albums ===
- Enregistrement public (1977)
- Alentours (1980)
- Quilapayún en Argentina (1983) (Live in Argentina)
- Quilapayún en Argentina Vol II (1985) (Live in Argentina Vol. II)
- Quilapayún en Chile (1989) (Live in Chile)
- A Palau (2003)
- El Reencuentro (2004)
- Musica en la Memoria - Juntos en Chile (2005) (Inti-Illimani + Quilapayún)

=== Compilations ===
- Quilapayún Chante Neruda (1983)
- Antología 1968-1992 (1998)
- La vida contra la muerte [Life against death] (2005)
- La fuerza de la historia [The force of history] (2006)

== References and other sources ==
- Section: Historia / 1965-1970 / Los Orígenes of www.quilapayun.org 2006 (in Spanish)
- Section: Discografía de Quilapayún of www.trovadores.net 2006 (in Spanish)
