= Rodolfo Parada =

Rodolfo Parada Lillo
- Born: 1946 (age 79–80); Chile
- Education: Sorbonne University of Paris
- Genres: Nueva canción chilena
- Occupations: singer-songwriter, artistic director
- Instruments: guitar, pan flute, percussion
- Years active: 1960s - present
- Formerly of: Quilapayún

Rodolfo Parada Lillo is a Chilean musician, composer, engineer and anthropologist. Parada joined Quilapayún in 1968, which made the group into a sextet - the formation which recorded the “Cantata Santa María de Iquique. Upon joining the group he became the major solo voice of the ensemble (e.g. in “Dicen que la patria es…”, “Por que los pobres no tienen”, “Plegaria a un labrador”, “Vamos mujer”. A fan of the “chanson française” he decided to reduce his activity as a student leader while the group was at its popularity peak during the Salvador Allende Government. He first composed “Ausencia” for the group in their “Quilapayún 5” album with assistance from Eduardo Carrasco.

Whilst in exile he composed the instrumental music pieces: “Susurro” and "El paso del ñandu", plus he also composed music for Pablo Neruda's poem "El arbol de los libres" and for Rafael Alberti's "La primavera". After exile his voice register underwent a change and he assumed a lower vocal range e.g. “Ronda del ausente”, “Luz negra”; “Complainte de Pablo Neruda” - inter alia.

After Eduardo Carrasco left the band in 1989 and became the group director and principal composer. During this period he earned a doctorate in anthropology from the Sorbonne in Paris, and when the activity of the band decreased he worked in the French Ministry of Culture. Parada was awarded the Ordre des Arts et des Lettres (order of arts and letters) which is a national order of merit the French Republic grants individuals recognized for their outstanding contribution to the development of culture.
