= Canciones folklóricas de América =

Studio album by Víctor Jara, Quilapayun
- Released: 1967
- Genre: Folk
- Length: 36:43
- Label: EMI/Odeon
- Producer: Víctor Jara

Víctor Jara, Quilapayun chronology
Víctor Jara (1967)	Canciones folklóricas de América (1967)	Pongo en tus manos abiertas (1969)

Canciones folklóricas de América (Folk Songs of America) is the third studio album by Chilean singer-songwriter Víctor Jara, and second by Chilean folk group Quilapayún released in 1967, on the EMI and Odeon labels.

== Music ==
The album was performed by Jara and Quilapayun, who established a "musical society" that began in 1966. It begins with a Jara's performance in English of Hush-a-bye, and although the album is called "Canciones folklóricas de América", includes two songs of Spanish origin, "Paloma del palomar" and "El tururururú". "Gira, gira, girasol" was written by Victor and the last song on the album, "El coneji", was originally a poem by Chilean Carlos Préndez Saldías, to which Víctor put music.

== Artwork ==
The album cover shows a peaceful and colorful design of birds in the jungle. Through Carlos Quezada, Vicente Larrea contacted Quilapayun and Victor for the design of the cover, Vicente at that time made about 120 album covers, 300 posters, and the logo of the label Discoteca del Cantar Popular (DICAP), which at that time was known as Jota Jota, and it was the label in charge of releasing in Santiago the Jara's next album, Pongo en tus manos abiertas (1969).

== Release ==
Canciones folklóricas de América was released in 1967, on the EMI, and Odeon labels. Jara for the album sales, received his first silver album. EMI released the album in other Latin American countries such as Uruguay (1970) or Argentina (1983).

== Track listing ==
Side A

No.	Title	Writer(s)	Length
1.	"Hush-a-bye" (American lullaby)		3:53
2.	"Bailecito" (Chilean traditional)		2:28
3.	"Paloma del palomar" (Spanish traditional)		1:13
4.	"Duerme negrita"	Eliseo Grenet	3:38
5.	"El llanto de mi madre" (Bolivian traditional)		2:45
6.	"El carrero"	Daniel Viglietti
7.	"Mare Mare" (Venezuelan traditional)		2:30

Side B

No.	Title	Writer(s)	Length
1.	"Noche de rosas"	Moshe Dor; Yosef Hadar	2:38
2.	"Tres bailecitos"	Ernesto Cavour	2:31
3.	"Gira, gira, girasol"	Víctor Jara	2:57
4.	"Peoncito del mandiocal"	Anibal Sampayo	2:21
5.	"El turururururú" (Spanish traditional)		2:22
6.	"El coneji"	Jara; Carlos Préndez Saldías	1:38
Total length:			36:43
