= Nueva canción =

Musical genre in Iberian America and the Iberian peninsula

- Stylistic origins: Latin American folk music
- Cultural origins: 1960s

Subgenres
- Nuevo canto

Regional scenes
- Argentina; Brazil; Bolivia; Chile; Colombia; Cuba; El Salvador; Guatemala; Mexico; Nicaragua; Paraguay; Peru; Portugal; Spain (Catalonia); Uruguay; Venezuela

Nueva canción (European Spanish: [ˈnweβa kanˈθjon], Latin American Spanish: [ˈnweβa kanˈsjon]; 'new song') is a left-wing social movement and musical genre in Latin America and the Iberian Peninsula, characterized by folk-inspired styles and socially committed lyrics. Nueva canción is widely recognized to have played a profound role in the pro-democracy social upheavals in Portugal, Spain and Latin America during the 1970s and 1980s, and was popular amongst socialist organizations in the region.

Songs reflecting conflict have a long history in Spanish, and in Latin America were particularly associated with the "corrido" songs of Mexico's War of Independence after 1810, and the early 20th century years of Revolution. Nueva canción then surfaced almost simultaneously during the 1960s in Argentina, Chile, Uruguay and Spain. The musical style emerged shortly afterwards in other areas of Latin America where it came to be known under similar names. Nueva canción renewed traditional Latin American folk music, and was soon associated with revolutionary movements, the Latin American New Left, liberation theology, hippie and human rights movements due to political lyrics. It would gain great popularity throughout Latin America, and left an imprint on several other genres like rock en español, cumbia and Andean music.

Nueva canción musicians often faced censorship, exile, torture, death, or forceful disappearances by the wave of right-wing military dictatorships that swept across Latin America and the Iberian peninsula in the Cold War era, e.g. in Francoist Spain, Pinochet's Chile, Salazar's Portugal and Videla and Galtieri's Argentina.

Due to their strongly political messages, some nueva canción songs have been used in later political campaigns, for example the Orange Revolution, which used Violeta Parra's "Gracias a la vida". Nueva canción has become part of Latin American and Iberian musical tradition, but is no longer a mainstream genre, and has given way to other genres, particularly rock en español.

== Characteristics ==
Nueva canción is a type of music which is committed to social good. Its musical and lyrical vernacular is rooted in the popular classes and often uses a popularly understood style of satire to advocate for sociopolitical change. The movement reacted against the dominance of American and European music in Latin America at the time by assuming an anti-imperial stance that was markedly less focused on the visual spectacle of commercial music and more focused on social and political messages. It characteristically talks about poverty, empowerment, imperialism, democracy, human rights, religion, and the Latin American identity.

Nueva canción draws heavily upon Andean music, música negra, Spanish music, Cuban music and other Latin American folklore. Most songs feature the guitar, and often the quena, zampoña, charango or cajón. The lyrics are typically in Spanish, with some indigenous or local words mixed in, and frequently utilize the poetic forms of copla and décima.

Nueva canción was explicitly related to leftist politics, advancing leftist ideals and flourishing within the structure of the Communist Party in Latin America. Cuban cultural organization Casa de las Américas hosted many notable gatherings of nueva canción musicians, including the 1967 Encuentro de la Canción Protesta.

Songs of conflict in Spanish have a very long history, with elements to be found in the "fronterizos", songs concerning the Reconquest of Spain from the Moors in the 15th century. More immediately, some of the roots of nueva canción may be seen in the Mexican "corrido", which took on a strongly political flavour during the War of Independence c. 1810, and then the Revolution after 1910. The modern nueva canción developed in the historical context of the "folklore boom" that occurred in Latin America in the 1950s. Chilean Violeta Parra and Argentine Atahualpa Yupanqui were two transitional figures as their mastery of folk music and personal involvement in leftist political organizations aided the eventual union of the two in nueva canción. The movement was also aided by legislation like Juan Perón's Decreto 3371/1949 de Protección de la Música Nacional and Law No. 14,226, which required that half of the music played on the radio or performed live be of national origin.

National manifestations of nueva canción began occurring in the late 1950s. The earliest were in Chile and Spain, where the movement promoted Catalan language and culture. The music quickly spread to Argentina and throughout Latin America during the 1960s and 1970s. Various national movements used their own terminology; however, the term "nueva canción" was adopted at the 1967 Encuentro de la Canción Protesta and has thereafter been used as an all-encompassing term. Though nueva canción is often considered a Pan-Latino phenomenon, national manifestations were varied and reacted to local political and cultural contexts.

== Regional manifestations ==
=== Chile: Nueva canción chilena (New Chilean Song) ===
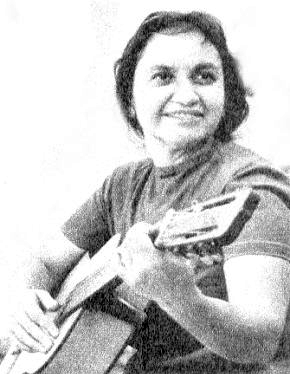
Violeta Parra, one of the most recognized figures of the nueva canción chilena

Since 1952, Violeta Parra, together with her children, gathered a total of 3,000 songs of peasant origin, and also released a book known as "Cantos Folklóricos Chilenos" (Chilean Folk Songs). In addition, Violeta's children Isabel and Ángel founded the cultural center Peña de los Parra, an organization that functioned as an organizing center for leftist political activism, and welcomed almost all of the major figures associated with early nueva canción, including Chileans: Patricio Manns, Víctor Jara, Rolando Alarcón, Payo Grondona, Patricio Castillo, Sergio Ortega, Homero Caro, Tito Fernández, and Kiko Álvarez, as well as non-Chilean musicians, such as Atahualpa Yupanqui from Argentina and Paco Ibañéz of Spain.

Nueva Canción Chilena moved out of small gathering places like Peña de los Parra in 1968 when the Communist Youth Party of Chile pressed 1000 copies of the album Por Vietnam by Quilapayún to raise funds for the band's travel to the International Youth Festival in Bulgaria. The copies sold out unexpectedly, a strong demonstration of the popular demand for this new music. In response, La Jota (Juventudes Comunistas) created Discoteca de Canto Popular (DICAP), a socially-conscious record label that grew in its five years of operation from a 4,000 record operation in 1968 to pressing over 240,000 records in 1973. DICAP united the various groups of young people wishing to spread nueva canción at a time when U.S. music dominated chiefly commercial radio fare. "DICAP was a key counterhegemonic institution that broke through the censorship and silence imposed by the conservative cultural entities of the elite."

In 1969 the Universidad Cátolica in Santiago hosted the Primer Festival de la nueva canción chilena. Salvador Allende's 1970 presidential campaign was a major turning point in the history of nueva canción chilena. Many artists became involved in the campaign; songs like "Venceremos" by Víctor Jara were widely used in Allende rallies. After Allende's election, nueva canción artists were utilized as a pro-Allende public relations machine inside and outside of Chile. By 1971, groups like Inti-Illimani and Quilapayún were receiving financial support from the Allende government.

In 1973, the United States/CIA-backed right-wing military coup overthrew Allende's democratic government, bombing the presidential palace. Pinochet's forces then rounded up 5,000 civilians into a soccer stadium for interrogation, torture, and execution. Victor Jara was beaten, tortured, and his wrists were broken, after several days he was executed and shot 44 times. His wife Joan Jara writes, "where his belly ought to have been was a gory, gaping void". Because of his popularity and fame in the music world, Jara is the most well-known victim of a regime that killed or "disappeared" at least 3,065 people and tortured more than 38,000, bringing the number of victims to 40,018. Other musicians, such as Patricio Manns and groups Inti-Illimani and Quilapayún, found safety outside the country. Under Augusto Pinochet nueva canción recordings were seized, burned, and banned from the airwaves and record stores. The military government exiled and imprisoned artists and went as far as to ban many traditional Andean instruments in order to suppress the nueva canción movement. This period in Chilean history is known as the "Apagón Cultural" (Cultural Blackout).

By late 1975, artists had begun to circumvent these restrictions through so-called "Andean Baroque" ensembles that performed standards of the Western classical repertoire on indigenous South American instruments. These performances took place in the politically neutral environments of churches, community centers, and the few remaining peñas. For this reason, and because of the novelty of the concept, these performances were allowed to continue without government interference. Performers gradually grew bolder, incorporating some of old nueva canción repertoire, though carefully avoiding overtly political topics. Artists began calling this music "Canto Nuevo", a term selected to both reference and distance the new movement from the former nueva canción. Because of the precarious political circumstances in which it existed, canto nuevo is notable for its use of highly metaphorical language, allowing songs to evade censors by disguising political messages beneath layers of symbolism. Live performances often included spoken introductions or interludes that provided insight into the song's real meaning.

As the 1980s arrived, advances in recording technology allowed supporters to informally exchange cassettes outside of the governmental control. An economic crisis forced Chilean television stations to hire cheaper Chilean performers rather than international stars for broadcast bookings, while a relaxation in government restrictions allowed canto nuevo performers to participate in several major popular music festivals. Increasing public recognition of the movement facilitated the gathering of its participants at events such as the Congreso de Artistas y Trabajadores (Conference of Artists and Workers) in 1983. The canto nuevo repertoire began to diversify, incorporating cosmopolitan influences such as electronic instruments, classical harmonies, and jazz influences.

Though the genre is not especially active today, the legacy of figures like Violeta Parra is enormous. Parra's music continues to be recorded by contemporary artists and her song "Gracias a la Vida" was recorded by supergroup Artists for Chile in an effort to raise relief funds in the wake of the 2010 Chilean earthquake. The protests that began in October 2019 showed a strong resurgence of nueva canción as curfewed residents began performing the music of Violeta Parra and Victor Jara and soon major artists began adapting and writing politically motivated music backing the protests and critical of the Piñera government.

=== Argentina: Nuevo cancionero (New Songbook) ===
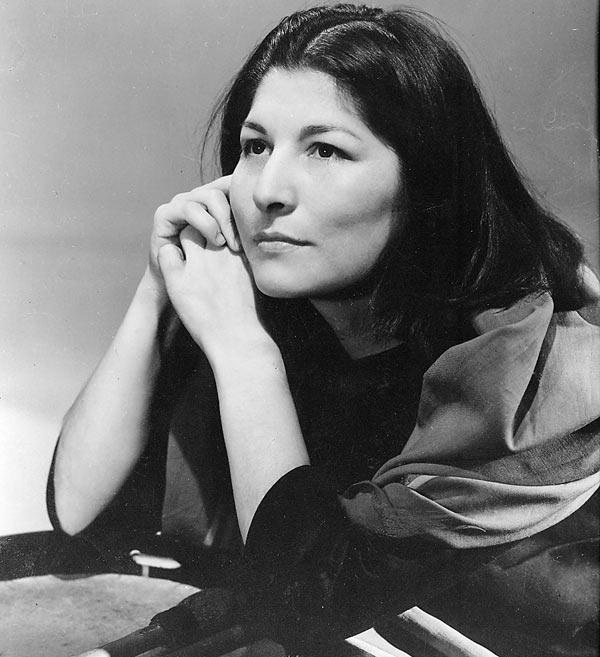
Mercedes Sosa from Argentina was among the very early nueva canción musicians

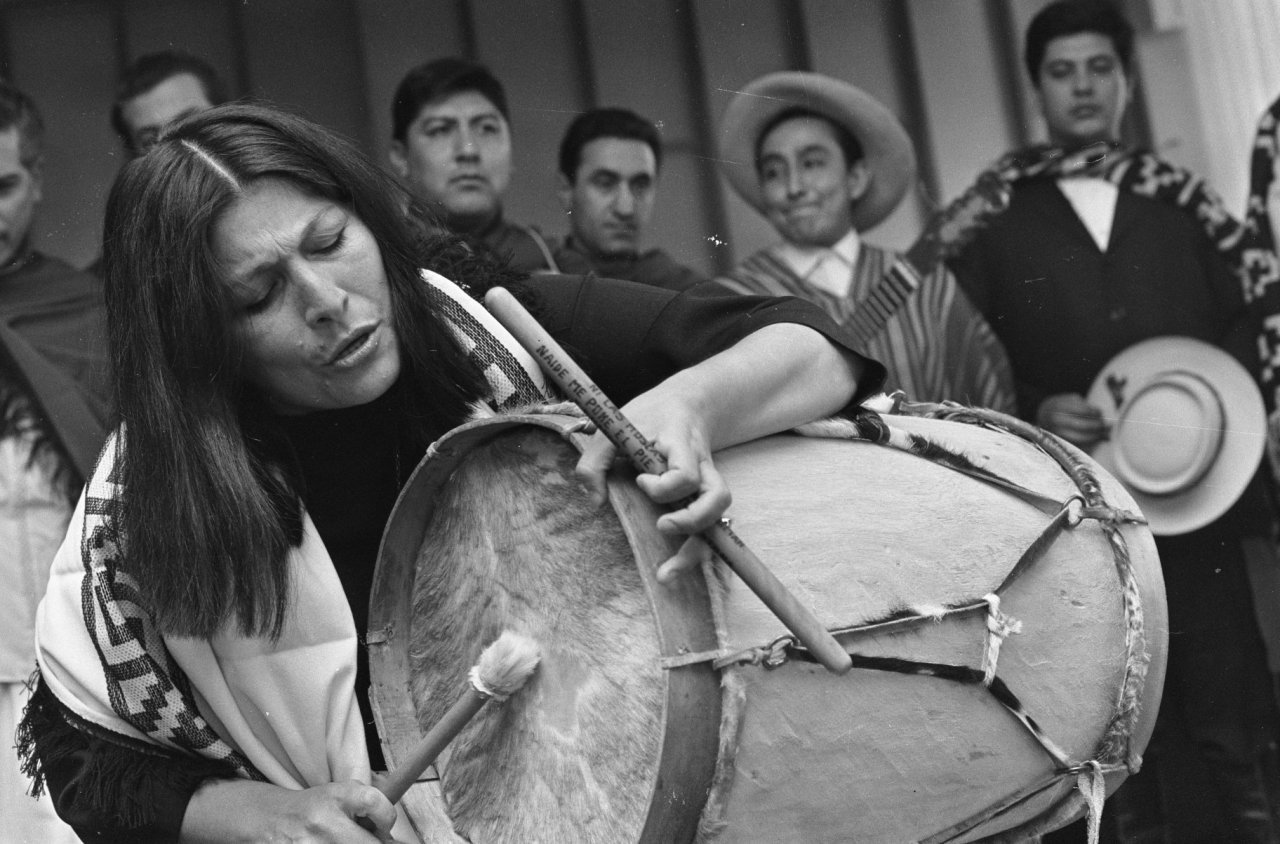
Mercedes Sosa performing in 1967

In Argentina, the movement was founded under the name "nuevo cancionero" and formally codified on 11 February 1963 when fourteen artists met in Mendoza, Argentina to sign the Manifiesto Fundacional de nuevo cancionero. Present were both musical artists and poet writers. The Argentine movement especially was a musico-literal. Writers like Armando Tejada Gomez were highly influential and made substantial contributions to the movement in the form of original poetry. The Manifesto's introduction places the roots of nuevo cancionero in the rediscovery of folk music and indigenous traditions to the work of folklorists Atahualpa Yupanqui and Buenaventura Luna and the internal urban migration that brought rural Argentines to the capital of Buenos Aires. The body of the document outlines the goal of the movement: the development of a national song that overcome the dominance of tango-folklore in Argentine national music and the rejection of pure commercialism. Instead nuevo cancionero sought to embrace of institutions that encouraged critical thinking and the open exchange of ideas.

Nuevo cancionero's most famous proponent was Mercedes Sosa. Her success at the 1965 Cosquin Folklore Festival introduced nuevo cancionero to new levels of public exposure after Argentine folk powerhouse Jorge Cafrune singled her out on stage as a budding talent. In 1967, Sosa completed her first international tour in the United States and Europe. Other notable nuevo cancionero artists of this time included Tito Francia, Víctor Heredia, and César Isella, who left the folk music group Los Fronterizos to pursue a solo career. In 1969 he set the poetry of Armando Tejada Gomez to produce "Canción para todos", an anthem later designated by UNESCO the hymn of Latin America.

Nuevo cancionero artists were among the approximately 30,000 victims of forced disappearances under Argentina's 1976–1983 military dictatorship. Additional censorship, intimidation, and persecution forced many artists into exile where they had more freedom to publicize and criticize the events unfolding in Latin America. Sosa, for example, participated in the first Amnesty International concert in London in 1979, and also performed in Israel, Canada, Colombia, and Brazil while continuing to record.

After the fall of the dictatorship in 1983, Argentine artists returned and performed massive comeback concerts that regularly filled sports areas and public parks with tens of thousands of people. Influences from time spent in exile abroad were clear through sample of instruments like the harmonica, drum set, bass guitar, electric keyboard, brass ensembles, backup singers, string instruments (especially double bass and violin), and stylistic and harmonic influences from the soundscapes of classical, jazz, pop, rock, and punk. Collaborations became increasingly common, especially between proponents of nuevo cancionero and the ideologically similar rock nacional.

Nuevo cancionero artists became symbols of a triumphant national identity. When Mercedes Sosa died, millions flooded the streets as her body lay in official state in the National Cathedral, an honor reserved for only the most prominent of national icons. While the community of musicians actively composing in the nuevo cancionero tradition is small, recordings and covers of nuevo cancionero classics remain popular in Argentina.

=== Cuba: Nueva trova (New Trova) ===
Of the regional manifestations of nueva canción, nueva trova is distinct because of its function within and support from the Castro government. While nueva canción in other countries primarily functioned in opposition to existing regimes, nueva trova emerged after the Cuban Revolution and enjoyed various degrees of state support throughout the late twentieth century. Nueva trova has its roots in the traditional trova, but differs from it because its content is, in the widest sense, political. It combines traditional folk music idioms with 'progressive' and often politicized lyrics that concentrate on socialism, injustice, sexism, colonialism, racism and similar 'serious' issues. Occasional examples of non-political styles in the nueva trova movement can also be found, for example, Liuba María Hevia, whose lyrics are focused on more traditional subjects such as love and solitude albeit in a highly poetical style. Later nueva trova musicians were also influenced by rock and pop of that time.

Silvio Rodríguez and Pablo Milanés became the most important exponents of the style. Carlos Puebla and Joseíto Fernández were long-time trova singers who added their weight to the new regime, but of the two only Puebla wrote special pro-revolution songs.

The Castro administration gave plenty of support to musicians willing to write and sing anti-U.S. imperialism or pro-revolution songs, an asset in an era when many traditional musicians were finding it difficult or impossible to earn a living. In 1967 the Casa de las Américas in Havana held a Festival de la canción de protesta (protest songs). Much of the effort was spent applauding anti-U.S. expressions. Tania Castellanos, a filín singer and author, wrote "¡Por Ángela!" in support of US political activist Angela Davis. César Portillo de la Luz wrote "Oh, valeroso Viet Nam". Institutions like the Grupo de Experimentación Sonora del ICAIC (GES) while not directly working in nueva trova, provided valuable musical training to amateur Cuban artists.

=== Spain and Catalonia: Nova Cançó ===
The Nova Cançó was an artistic movement of the late 1950s that promoted Catalan music in Francoist Spain. The movement sought to normalize use of the Catalan language after public use of the language was forbidden when Catalonia fell in the Spanish Civil War. Artists used the Catalan language to assert Catalan identity in popular music and denounce the injustices of the Franco regime. Musically, it had roots in the French Chanson.

In 1957, the writer Josep Maria Espinàs gave lectures on the French singer-songwriter Georges Brassens, whom he called "the troubadour of our times." Espinàs had begun to translate some of Brassens' songs into Catalan. In 1958, two EPs of songs in Catalan were released: Hermanas Serrano cantan en catalán los éxitos internacionales ("The Serrano Sisters Sing International Hits in Catalan") and José Guardiola: canta en catalán los éxitos internationales. They are now considered the first recordings of modern music in the Catalan language. These singers, as well as others such as Font Sellabona and Rudy Ventura, form a prelude to the Nova Cançó.

At the suggestion of Josep Benet i de Joan and Maurici Serrahima, a group composed of Jaume Armengol, Lluís Serrahima and Miquel Porter started composing Catalan songs. In 1959, after an article by Lluís Serrahima, titled "Ens calen cançons d’ara" ("We need songs for today"), was published in Germinàbit, more authors and singers were attracted to the movement. Miquel Porter, Josep Maria Espinàs and Remei Margarit founded the group Els Setze Jutges (The Sixteen Judges, in Catalan). Their first concert, although still not with this name, was on 19 December 1961, in Barcelona. Their first performance with the name of Els Setze Jutges was in Premià de Mar in 1962. New singers joined the group in the following years, until the number of sixteen (Setze), like Delfí Abella and Francesc Pi de la Serra. The first Nova Cançó records appeared in 1962, and many musical bands, vocal groups, singer-songwriters, and interpreters picked up the trend.

In 1963, a professional Catalan artist, Salomé, and a Valencian, Raimon, were awarded the first prize of the Fifth Mediterranean Song Festival with the song "Se’n va anar" ("[She] left"). Other important participants in the movement included Guillem d'Efak and Núria Feliu, who received the Spanish Critics' Award in 1966, or other new members of Els Setze Jutges. Some of them were even well known abroad. Apart from Raimon, other former members of Els Setze Jutges continued their careers successfully, including Guillermina Motta, Francesc Pi de la Serra, Maria del Mar Bonet, Lluís Llach and Joan Manuel Serrat. Other significant figures appeared somewhat later, like the Valencian Ovidi Montllor.

=== Nicaragua ===
Nicaragua nueva canción (Nueva canción nicaragüense) musicians are attributed with transmitting social and political messages, and aiding in the ideological mobilisation of the populace during the Sandinista revolution. Carlos Mejía Godoy y Los de Palacagüina were probably the best known proponents of this style.

== See also ==
- List of socialist songs
