= Sergio Ortega (composer) =

Chilean musician (1938–2003)

- Born: Sergio Ortega Alvarado; February 2, 1938; Antofagasta, Chile
- Died: September 16, 2003 (aged 65); Paris, France
- Education: National Conservatory, University of Chile
- Occupations: Composer, pianist, poet, teacher and politician
- Style: Nueva canción chilena
- Political party: Communist Party of Chile
- Children: 3 sons, including Chañaral Ortega-Miranda
- Awards: Illustrious son; Order of Friendship of Peoples

Sergio Ortega Alvarado (February 2, 1938 – September 16, 2003) was a Chilean composer, pianist, poet, teacher and politician. He is recognized for having composed important Chilean left-wing politics anthems, among them are "Venceremos" and "El pueblo unido jamás será vencido", as well as the anthem of the Radical Party, Communist Youth and Workers' United Center of Chile.

== Biography ==
Sergio Ortega Alvarado was born in Antofagasta, Chile on February 2, 1938. He had brief studies of Architecture and Literature, until he entered the National Conservatory of the University of Chile and began to study composition with Roberto Falabella and Gustavo Becerra-Schmidt. After graduating, he worked at the Institute of Musical Extension and six years as a sound engineer at the Experimental Theater of the University, at the Antonio Varas Theater.

During this period he composed music for theater and cinema. he composed music for works by Alejandro Sieveking and Isidora Aguirre, including Asunto sofisticado and La dama del canasto, respectively. In 1964, the filmmaker Pedro Chaskel heads the music project for the 1925 silent film, El Húsar de la muerte by Pedro Sienna, commissioned by Ortega himself, who made a special composition that was registered in the Hall of Honor of the University of Chile. Later he composed the soundtrack of El Chacal de Nahueltoro in 1969 by filmmaker Miguel Littin. In 2001, he also composed a song for the film Taxi para tres. Ortega's music was based mainly on a typical classical music sound, full of polyphonies and dissonances. His colleague, Luis Advis, also presented these characteristics within his music.

Pablo Neruda entrusted him with musicalizing the assembly of his translation of Romeo and Juliet. Later, he would ask her to compose the soundtrack for his only play, Fulgor y muerte de Joaquín Murieta, premiered in 1967 at the Antonio Varas Theater, under the direction of Pedro Orthous. The work, which made a successful tour of Europe, tells the story of Joaquín Murieta, a Chilean gold prospector who comes to California in search of fortune. The story had already appeared in Neruda's books as the fourth episode of La barcarola. However, Neruda writes the play, with characters, dialogues, script, etc. On December 14, 1998, the two-act opera Fulgor y muerte de Joaquín Murieta, composed by him and with a libretto based on the homonymous work by Neruda, premiered at the Municipal Theatre of Santiago.

In 1967, he worked with the singer-songwriter Víctor Jara in the musical arrangements of some of the songs on his self-titled album, at the same time he directed his orchestra that he accompanied on the tracks "El aparecido", "Solo" and "Así como hoy matan negros". Ortega was a member of the Communist Party of Chile. He together with the singer-songwriter Victor Jara and the lyricist Claudio Iturra, he composed "Venceremos" the electoral theme of the socialist president Salvador Allende and a world anthem of leftist movements. He composed the 1970 album by Inti-Illimani, Canto al programa, with contributions from Luis Advis and lyrics by Julio Rojas. He also worked on a musical version of Neruda's Canto General with Gustavo Becerra and the group Aparcoa, which was staged in 1970. About three months before the 1973 Chilean coup d'état against La Moneda, he recorded "El pueblo unido jamás será vencido" together with the group Quilapayún, a recognized worldwide protest anthem. After the coup, he took refuge in the embassy of Panama. He then moved to France, where he would continue his musical career.

In 1978, he composed and premiered at an Austrian festival, Bernardo O'Higgins Riquelme, 1810. Poema sonoro para el padre de mi patria. For the celebration of the bicentennial of the French Revolution, Ortega worked on a praised operatic trilogy. Ortega worked with his eldest son, Chañaral Ortega-Miranda (later member of the French faction of Quilapayún), on an operatic version of Pedro Páramo, the novel by Mexican writer Juan Rulfo.

In 1970, he began to direct the university's TV station, Channel 9, which he continued until 1973. In 1977 Ortega visited the USSR, participated in the festival "Red Carnation". He was given permission to return to Chile in 1983, and did so several times. During his exile, Ortega directed L'Ecole Nationale de Musique, in Pantin, France.

During the 30th anniversary of the Military Coup, he was diagnosed with advanced pancreatic cancer. In September 2003, Sergio Ortega was already in a coma at the Saint Louis hospital in Paris. He died on September 15, at the age of 65, surrounded by his wife and their three sons. On the 27th of the same month, his remains would be buried in the General Cemetery. The Workers' United Center, the Antonio Varas Theater and the Faculty of Arts of the University of Chile made official tributes. In the Municipal Theatre, the choir led by Max Valdés, interpreted the final parts of Fulgor y muerte de Joaquín Murieta.

== Discography ==
- La dama del canasto (1965)
- La fragua (1973)
