= El derecho de vivir en paz (song) =

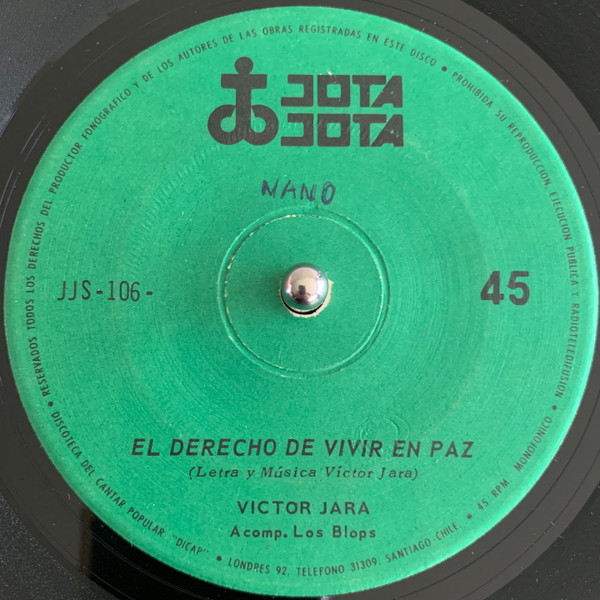

Single by Víctor Jara

from the album El derecho de vivir en paz
- A-side: "El derecho de vivir en paz"
- B-side: "Plegaria a un labrador"
- Published: 1971
- Genre: Nueva canción chilena, protest song
- Length: 4:37
- Label: Jota Jota (JJS-106)
- Songwriters: Víctor Jara, Patricio Castillo

Víctor Jara singles chronology
"Plegaria a un labrador / Te recuerdo Amanda" (1969)	"El derecho de vivir en paz" (1971)	"Ni chicha ni limoná / B.R.P." (1971)

El derecho de vivir en paz (The Right to Live in Peace) is the sixth official single released by Chilean singer-songwriter Víctor Jara as a solo artist. It was written by Jara in 1969, as he worked in the "Vietrock" play by Megan Terry. The song was released in 1971 by the Jota Jota label and was included in the El derecho de vivir en paz album, released later that year.

El derecho de vivir en paz is a protest song against the US intervention in the Vietnam War, and is a tribute to Ho Chi Minh. During its recording in the RCA Studios in Santiago, several musicians collaborated, including Patricio Castillo, Celso Garrido-Lecca, Inti Illimani and Los Blops.

It later became a symbol of protest against Chile's military dictatorship under Augusto Pinochet, and an anthem for the 2019–2022 Chilean protests.

It was first performed live in 1971 at the Teatro Marconi (current Teatro Nescafé de las Artes).

== Music ==
It is considered as one of the most innovative and experimental songs of Jara. The song mixes electric guitars and the Blops organ within a sound linked to folk roots. The song begins with a light guitar, later summing up the rest of the instruments. It also includes an electric bass and drums, unusual within Jara's previous work.

== Cover versions ==
=== Músicxs de Chile ===
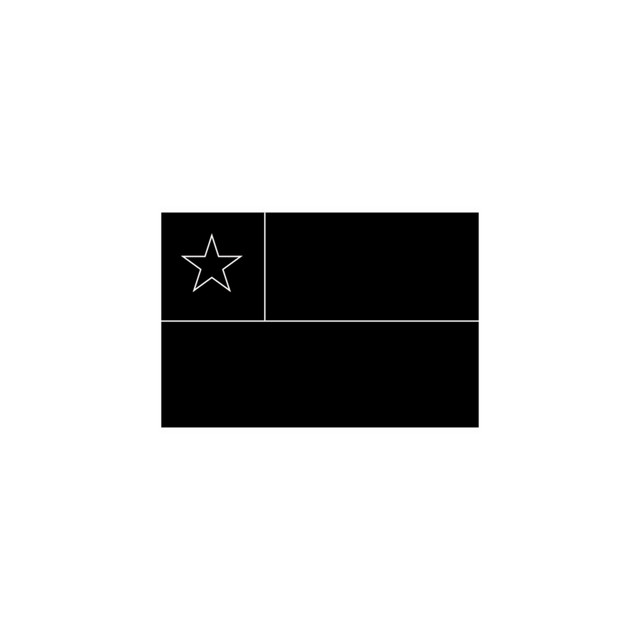
Single cover of the Músicxs de Chile version.

Amid massive protests in Chile in October 2019, over twenty Chilean musicians formed supergroup Músicos de Chile (stylized Músicxs de Chile) and recreated the song, modifying the lyrics in order to include mentions of popular demands.

The new version was an initiative of Fundación Víctor Jara and Jara's widow Joan Jara, as a response against the militarization of cities and violence committed by State forces against protesters.

=== Bad Bunny Concert Tour ===
On January 9th, 2026, Puerto Rican artist Bad Bunny paid tribute to Jara by including an instrumental cover of El derecho de vivir en paz during the first of three shows in the Estadio Nacional (National Stadium).
