= List of non-English signature songs =

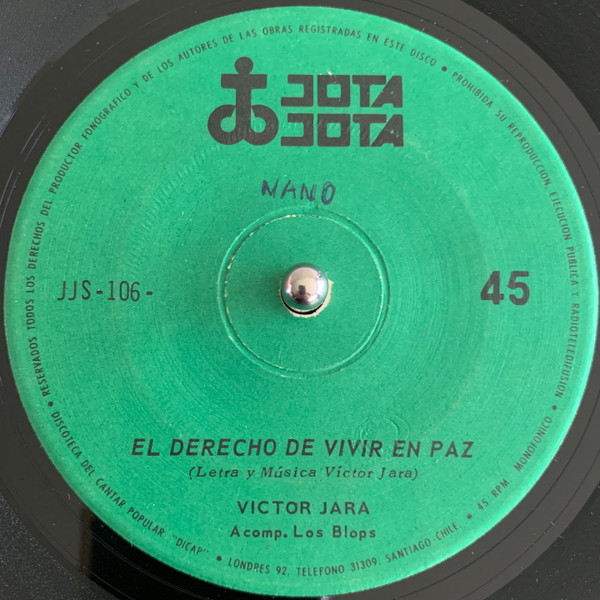
Víctor Jara's "El derecho de vivir en paz" became the Chilean's signature song

A signature song is the one song (or, in some cases, one of a few songs) that a popular and well-established recording artist or band is most closely identified with or best known for. This is generally differentiated from a one-hit wonder in that the artist usually has had success with other songs as well.

A signature song may be a song that spearheads an artist's initial mainstream breakthrough, a song that revitalizes an artist's career, or a song that simply represents a high point in an artist's career. Often, a signature song will feature significant characteristics of an artist and may encapsulate the artist's particular sound and style. A band or group can have a signature song as a whole while an individual member may also be strongly identified with a different signature song from the same catalog; for example, Fleetwood Mac's signature song is widely considered to be "Don't Stop", but the band's song "Landslide" is regarded as member Stevie Nicks's signature song as she wrote and performed it.

Signature songs can be the result of spontaneous public identification, or a marketing tool developed by the music industry to promote artists, sell their recordings, and develop a fan base. Artists and bands with a signature song are generally expected to perform it at every concert appearance, often as an encore on concert tours, sometimes being the last song of the setlist.

== Examples by artist ==
Listed alphabetically by artist.

Song	Artist	Released	Language	Written by / notes	Ref(s)
=== # ===
"I Am the Best"	2NE1	2011	Korean	Teddy Park	
=== A ===
"Basang-basa sa Ulan"	Aegis	1998	Tagalog	Celso Abenoja	
"Armageddon"	Aespa	2024	Korean	Ejae, SuminWaker (153/Joombas), No Identity, and Bang Hye-hyun	
"Anak"	Freddie Aguilar	1978	Tagalog	Aguilar and produced by Celso Llarina and Tito Sotto for the 1978 Metro Manila Popular Music Festival	
"I Will Go to You Like the First Snow"	Ailee	2017	Korean	Mina and composed by Rocoberry for the television series Guardian: The Lonely and Great God	
"Tegami (Haikei Jūgo no Kimi e)"	Angela Aki	2008	Japanese	Angela Aki	
"Nandito Ako"	Ogie Alcasid	1989	Filipino	Aaron Paul del Rosario	
"Kay Ganda ng Ating Musika"	Hajji Alejandro	1978	Filipino	Ryan Cayabyab as the winning entry of the 1978 Metro Manila Popular Music Festival	
"Todo de Ti"	Rauw Alejandro	2021	Spanish	Eric Pérez Rovira, José M. Collazo, Jairo Jhoau Bascope Ochoa, Luis J. González, Rafael E. Pabón Navedo, and Raul Alejandro Ocasio Ruiz	
"Lili Marlene"	Lale Andersen	1939	German	Hans Leip. There is a "Lili Marlene" and Lale Andersen memorial in Langeoog, Germany.	
"Girl from Rio"	Anitta	2021	English and Portuguese	Vinicius de Moraes, Norman Gimbel, Tom Jobim, Anitta, Mikkel Eriksen, Tor Hermansen, Raye, and Gale. Interpolates "The Girl from Ipanema" by de Moraes and Jobim.	
"Sen Trope"	Azis	2011	Bulgarian	Martin Biolchev and Vasil Boyanov	
"La Bohème"	Charles Aznavour	1965	French	Aznavour	
=== B ===
"From Me to U"	Babymetal	2025	English and Japanese	Moriah Rose Pereira, Jordan Fish, and Mk-metal	
"Batter Up"	Babymonster	2023	Korean and English	Chaz Mishan, Yang Hyun-suk, Dee.P, Jared Lee, Asa, Choi Hyun-suk, Lee Chan-hyuk, Where the Noise, and BigTone	
"Soy Peor"	Bad Bunny	2016	Spanish	DJ Luian and Benito Martínez as Bad Bunny's (Martínez's) solo single	
"Mi Gente"	J Balvin	2017	Spanish	José Osorio, Willy William, Adam Assad, Andrés David Restrepo, and Mohombi Nzasi Moupondo as a remake of William's French song "Voodoo Song"	
"Hallelujah"	Bamboo	2005	Tagalog and English	Nathan Azarcon, Bamboo Mañalac, Ira Cruz, and Vic Mercado	
"Kathang Isip"	Ben&Ben	2017	Tagalog	Miguel Benjamin Guico and Paolo Benjamin Guico	
"Boundless Oceans, Vast Skies"	Beyond	1993	Cantonese	Wong Ka Kui	
"Fantastic Baby"	BigBang	2012	Korean	G-Dragon, T.O.P, and Teddy	
"Pantropiko"	Bini	2023	Tagalog and English	Mat Olavides, Jumbo De Belen, Angelika Ortiz, and Pow Chavez	
"Torete"	Acel Bisa	2000	Filipino	Joseph Darwin Hernandez for Bisa's band Moonstar88	
"Kill This Love"	Blackpink	2019	Korean and English	Teddy and Bekuh Boom	
"Only One"	BoA	2012	Korean and English	BoA	
"Con te partirò"	Andrea Bocelli	1995	Italian	Francesco Sartori (music) and Lucio Quarantotto (lyrics). Bocelli re-recorded a bilingual (English and Italian) version of the song with Sarah Brightman in 1996, titled "Time to Say Goodbye".	
"Spring Day"	BTS	2017	Korean	"Hitman" Bang, Pdogg, RM, Adora, Arlissa Ruppert, Peter Ibsen, and Suga	
=== C ===
"Goodbye Kiss"	Jacky Cheung	1993	Mandarin	Philip Yin. Later adapted into English as "Take Me to Your Heart" (2004) by Michael Learns to Rock.	
"Love Confession"	Jay Chou	2016	Mandarin	Vincent Fang	
"Mr. DJ"	Sharon Cuneta	1978	Filipino and English	Rey Valera	
"Multo"	Cup of Joe	2024	Filipino	Raphaell Ridao and Redentor Immanuel Ridao	
=== D ===
"Gasolina"	Daddy Yankee	2004	Spanish	Ramón Ayala and Eddie Ávila	
"You Were Beautiful"	Day6	2017	Korean	Young K, Lee Woo-min, and Wonpil	
"Strobe"	Deadmau5	2009	None (instrumental)	Joel Zimmerman	
"Malaya"	Moira Dela Torre	2017	Tagalog	Dela Torre. Included in the soundtrack of the 2016 film Camp Sawi.	
"Falling In Love Again"	Marlene Dietrich	1930	German and English	Composed by Friedrich Hollaender	
"Uhaw"	Dilaw	2022	Filipino	Vie Dela Rosa and Leonard Obero	
"Ako Ang Nasawi, Ako ang Nagwagi"	Dulce	1978	Filipino	George Canseco for a Hong Kong singing competition that it won	
=== E ===
"El Layali"	Nawal El Zoghbi	2000	Arabic	Khaled Mounir and Mohamed Rahim, and arranged by Hamid Al Shaeri	
"Bite Me"	Enhypen	2023	Korean and English	Cirkut, David Stewart, Jason Evigan, Lourdiz, and Supreme Boi	
"Ang Huling El Bimbo"	Eraserheads	1995	Filipino	Ely Buendia	
=== F ===
"Meteor Rain"	F4	2001	Mandarin	Originally Ken Hirai and arranged by Shirō Sagisu as "Gaining Through Losing" (2001), with Wu Yukang adapting the song in Mandarin as "Meteor Rain", the theme song of the Taiwanese television series of the same title.	
"Atemlos durch die Nacht"	Helene Fischer	2013	German	Kristina Bach as Fischer's biggest hit to date and her first top 10 entry in Austria, Germany, Luxembourg, and Switzerland	
"Pinay"	Florante	1984	Tagalog	Florante de Leon	
=== G ===
"Querida"	Juan Gabriel	1984	Spanish	Gabriel	
"Rough"	GFriend	2016	Korean	Iggy and Youngbae	
"Gee"	Girls' Generation	2009	Korean and Japanese	Ahn Myung-won, Kim Young-deuk and Kanata Nakamura	
"Simpleng Tao"	Gloc-9	2003	Tagalog	Aristotle Pollisco and Christian Martinez	
"Just Right"	Got7	2015	Korean	J.Y. Park "The Asiansoul"	
=== H ===
"Issawa Style"	H-Kayne	2005	Arabic	Othman Benhami, Ezzedine Bouhout, Adel Benchekroun, and Hatim Bensalha	
"Nag-iisang Ikaw"	Louie Heredia	1989	Tagalog	Vehnee Saturno	
"Manila"	Hotdog	1976	Filipino	Dennis and Rene Garcia	
=== I ===
"Pick Me"	I.O.I	2015	Korean and English	Midas-T for the contestants of Produce 101 (2016)	
"Lo Mejor de Tu Vida"	Julio Iglesias	1987	Spanish	Manuel Alejandro and Marian Beigbeder	
"Love Scenario"	iKon	2018	Korean	B.I and Bobby	
"Not Cute Anymore"	Illit	2025	Korean	Jasper Harris, Sasha Alex Sloan, and Youra	
"Icy"	Itzy	2019	Korean	J.Y. Park "The Asiansoul", Cazzi Opeia, Ellen Berg, Daniel Caesar, Ludwig Lindell, Ashley Alisha, and Lauren Dyson	
"Through the Night"	IU	2017	Korean	Kim Je-hwi and Kim Hee-won	
"Love Dive"	Ive	2022	Korean	Seo Ji-eum, Sophia Brennan, Elle Campbell, and Nick Hahn	
"Mundo"	IV of Spades	2018	Filipino	Unique Salonga and Zild Benitez	
=== J ===
"Trivia 起: Just Dance"	J-Hope	2018	Korean	Hiss noise and J-Hope for the latter's band BTS	
"El derecho de vivir en paz"	Víctor Jara	1971	Spanish	Jara and Patricio Castillo as a protest song against American intervention in the Vietnam War and Chile's military dictatorship under Augusto Pinochet	
"Bakit Pa Ba"	Jay-R	2003	Tagalog	Vehnee Saturno	
"Soy rebelde"	Jeanette	1971	Spanish	Manuel Alejandro and Ana Magdalena	
"Solo"	Jennie	2018	Korean	Teddy and 24. Made Jennie the first lead female K-pop soloist to top the Billboard World Digital Songs chart in the United States.	
"Lie"	Jimin	2016	Korean	Docskim, Sumin, "Hitman" Bang, Jimin, and Pdogg for Jimin's band BTS, but sung as a solo by Jimin	
"The Girl from Ipanema"	Antônio Carlos Jobim	1964	Portuguese and English	Jobim (music) and Vinicius de Moraes (lyrics) in 1962 for Pery Ribeiro, with Stan Getz and Astrud Gilberto's 1963 English recording becoming an international hit. Inducted into the Grammy Hall of Fame in 2000 and the Latin Grammy Hall of Fame the following year.	
"Di Lang Ikaw"	Juris	2010	Tagalog	Juris Fernandez and Aiza Seguerra as the lead single from Fernandez's (Juris's) debut solo album Now Playing	
=== K ===
"Tusa"	Karol G	2019	Spanish and English	Keityn, Karol G, Nicki Minaj, and Ovy on the Drums	
"Gabriela"	Katseye	2025	English and Spanish	Andrew Watt, John Ryan, Ali Tamposi, Charlotte Aitchison, and Sara Schell	
"Songbird"	Kenny G	1987	None (instrumental)	Kenny G	
"Afirika"	Angélique Kidjo	2002	French	Kidjo and Christian McBride	
"Dengan Menyebut Nama Allah"	Novia Kolopaking	1992	Indonesian	Dwiki Dharmawan and Ags Arya Dipayana	
=== L ===
"Buwan"	Juan Karlos Labajo	2018	Tagalog	Labajo for his eponymous band	
"Love You for 10,000 Years"	Andy Lau	2000	Mandarin	Lau, Giorgio Moroder, Jacky Chan, and Larry Lee	
"Mi Gente"	Héctor Lavoe	1975	Spanish	Johnny Pacheco	
"If Only"	JJ Lin	2014	Mandarin	Lin Xi	
"Raining in Manila"	Lola Amour	2023	Tagalog and English	Pio Dumayas, Raymond King, and David Yuhico	
"Auld Lang Syne"	Guy Lombardo	1939	Scots	A Scots-language poem Robert Burns in 1788	
"Love's Theme"	The Love Unlimited Orchestra	1973	None (instrumental)	Barry White	
=== M ===
"Mga Kababayan"	Francis Magalona	1990	Filipino	Magalona and Jaime Antiporda	
"Pata Pata"	Miriam Makeba	1967	Xhosa	Makeba and Jerry Ragovoy	
"You're the Best"	Mamamoo	2016	Korean	Kim Do-hoon, Moonbyul, and Solar	
"Jopay"	Mayonnaise	2004	Tagalog	Monty Macalino as an homage to the dancer of the same name	
"Mas que nada"	Sérgio Mendes	1966	Portuguese	Written and originally recorded by Jorge Ben in 1963 with Mendes for his band Brasil '66's debut album Herb Alpert Presents Sergio Mendes & Brasil '66 (1966)	
"Universe"	Minhyun	2019	Korean	Minhyun, Bumzu, Seo Ji-eum, and Park Gi-tae	
"Bukas na Lang Kita Mamahalin"	Lani Misalucha	2000	Filipino	Jimmy Borja	
"Mata"	Mojofly	2005	Tagalog	Lougee Basabas	
"Bboom Bboom"	Momoland	2018	Korean and Japanese	Shinsadong Tiger and Beom x Nang	
"Palagi"	TJ Monterde	2023	Tagalog	Monterde for his wife, KZ Tandingan	
"Akin Ka Na Lang"	Morissette	2014	Filipino	Francis Kiko Salazar for Himig Handog	
"Ao to Natsu"	Mrs. Green Apple	2018	Japanese	Motoki Ohmori	
"Bad Girl"	Anita Mui	1985	Cantonese	Richard Lam, Charlie Dore, and Julian Littman	
=== N ===
"Cherry Bomb"	NCT 127	2017	Korean	Taeyong, Mark, Deepflow, Lim Jung-hyo, Oh Min-joo, Dwayne "Dem Jointz" Abernathy Jr., Deez, Jennifer Decilveo, Jakob Mihoubi, Rudi Daouk, Michael Woods, Kevin White, Andrew Bazzi, and MZMC	
"Pagsamo"	Arthur Nery	2021	Filipino	Nery	
"OMG"	NewJeans	2023	Korean and English	Ylva Dimberg and Hanni, and composed by Park Jin-su of XXX, Dimberg, and David Dawood	
=== O ===
"Wherever you are"	One Ok Rock	2010	English and Japanese	Takahiro Moriuchi for his friend's wedding	
=== P ===
"La solitudine"	Laura Pausini	1993	Italian	Angelo Valsiglio, Pietro Cremonesi, and Federico Cavalli for the 43rd Sanremo Music Festival, where it won the newcomers' section of the competition	
"Nessun dorma"	Luciano Pavarotti	1972	Italian	An aria from the final act of Italian composer Giacomo Puccini's 1926 opera Turandot (text by Giuseppe Adami and Renato Simoni)	
"La Vie en rose"	Edith Piaf	1945	French	Piaf. Awarded a Grammy Hall of Fame Award in 1998.	
"Gangnam Style"	Psy	2012	Korean and English	Psy and Yoo Gun-hyung	
=== Q ===
"Patuloy Ang Pangarap"	Angeline Quinto	2011	Tagalog	Jonathan Manalo	
=== R ===
"Order Made"	Radwimps	2008	Japanese	Yojiro Noda	
"Rainism"	Rain	2008	English and Korean	Jung Ji-hoon and Bae Jin-ryeol	
"Du hast"	Rammstein	1997	German	Richard Kruspe, Paul Landers, Till Lindemann, Christian Lorenz, Oliver Riedel, and Christoph Schneider	
"Tilted"	Rahim Redcar	2015	English and French	Héloïse Letissier as the English version of Letissier's (Redcar's) French single "Christine" (2014). Credited under Redcar's pseudonym, Christine and the Queens.	
"Red Flavor"	Red Velvet	2017	Korean	Kenzie and composed by Caesar & Loui	
"La Chacalosa"	Jenni Rivera	1997	Spanish	Rivera	
"Despechá"	Rosalía	2022	Spanish	Rosalia Vila, Carlos Ortiz, David Rodríguez, Juan Rivera, Nino Segarra, Noah Goldstein, and Dylan Patrice	
=== S ===
"Sukiyaki"	Kyu Sakamoto	1961	Japanese	Hachidai Nakamura (music) and Rokusuke Ei (lyrics)	
"Oye Cómo Va"	Santana	1971	Spanish	Written and originally recorded by Tito Puente in 1962. Santana's version was inducted into the Latin Grammy Hall of Fame in 2001 and the Grammy Hall of Fame in 2002.	
"Hindi Magbabago"	Randy Santiago	1988	Filipino	Tats Faustino	
"Pagdating ng Panahon"	Ice Seguerra	2001	Tagalog	Edith Gallardo and Moy Ortiz. Credited under Seguerra's pre-gender transition name "Aiza Seguerra".	
"Como la Flor"	Selena	1992	Spanish	A.B. Quintanilla and Pete Astudillo. The final song Selena performed live before her death in 1995.	
"Very Nice"	Seventeen	2016	Korean	Woozi, Bumzu, S.Coups, and Vernon	
"Alipin"	Shamrock	2005	Tagalog	Sam Santos	
"Lucifer"	Shinee	2010	Korean and Japanese	Yoo Young-jin; composed by Bebe Rexha, Adam Kapit, Ryan S. Jhun, and Yoo Young-jin; and produced by Lee Soo-man	
"Hoppípolla"	Sigur Rós	2005	Icelandic	Jón Þór Birgisson, Orri Páll Dýrason, Georg Hólm, and Kjartan Sveinsson	
"Para sa Akin"	Sitti	2006	Tagalog	Emil Pama	
"Kailan"	Smokey Mountain	1989	Tagalog	Ryan Cayabyab	
"Jeepney"	Sponge Cola	2005	Tagalog	Datu Pendatun	
"God's Menu"	Stray Kids	2020	Korean	Bang Chan, Changbin, and Han	
"Cloudy Day"	Stefanie Sun	2000	Mandarin and Southern Min	Kate Liao and Peter Lee	
"Pasilyo"	SunKissed Lola	2022	Filipino	Alvin Serito. Made SunKissed Lola the first Filipino band to lead the Billboard Philippines Songs chart.	
"Sorry, Sorry"	Super Junior	2009	Korean and Japanese	Yoo Young-jin	
"Gypsy Queen"	Gábor Szabó	1966	None (instrumental)	Szabó	
=== T ===
"Roly-Poly"	T-ara	2011	Korean	Shinsadong Tiger and Choi Kyu-sung	
"Eyes, Nose, Lips"	Taeyang	2014	Korean	Teddy Park, Dee.P|P.K, Bekuh Boom, and Taeyang	
"The Moon Represents My Heart"	Teresa Teng	1977	Mandarin	Weng Ching-hsi and Sun Yi for Taiwanese singer Chen Fen-lan in 1973 and later re-recorded by Teng in 1977	
"Cheer Up"	Twice	2015	Korean	Sam Lewis and composed by Black Eyed Pilseung	
=== U ===
"Oo"	UDD	2006	Tagalog	Armi Millare. Credited as Up Dharma Down.	
"First Love"	Hikaru Utada	1999	Japanese and English	Utada	
=== V ===
"Ngayon at Kailanman"	Basil Valdez	1977	Tagalog	George Canseco	
"Sana Maulit Muli"	Gary Valenciano	1988	Tagalog	Valenciano and Angeli Pangilinan	
"La Bamba"	Ritchie Valens	1958	Spanish	Adapted by Valens from a Mexican folk song. Inducted into the Grammy Hall of Fame in 2000 and the Latin Grammy Hall of Fame in 2013.	
"Awitin Mo at Isasayaw Ko"	VST & Company	1978	Tagalog	Joey de Leon and Vic Sotto	
=== W ===
"I Love You 3000"	Jackson Wang	2019	Mandarin	Originally written and recorded by Stephanie Poetri with Wang covering the song in Mandarin	
"Pōkarekare Ana"	Hayley Westenra	2003	Māori	Traditional New Zealand love song covered by Westenra on her 2003 album Pure	
"Nobody"	Wonder Girls	2008	Korean, Japanese, English, and Chinese	Park Jin-young and Rhee Woo-seok. It was the first song by a Korean artist to appear on the US Billboard Hot 100.	
=== X ===
"Actor"	Joker Xue	2015	Mandarin	Xue	
=== Y ===
"Banal Na Aso, Santong Kabayo"	Yano	1994	Filipino	Westdon Abay	
"The Bund"	Frances Yip	1980	Cantonese	Composed by Joseph Koo with the lyrics by Wong Jim	
"Idol"	Yoasobi	2023	Japanese	Ayase. Became the first Japanese-language song to top the Billboard Global Excl. US, and was marked at number seven on the Billboard Global 200, the highest ever position by a Japanese act in its history.	
"Lemon"	Kenshi Yonezu	2018	Japanese	Yonezu for the television series Unnatural	
"Dan Sebenarnya"	Yuna	2008	Malay	Yuna	
"Maldita primavera"	Yuri	1981	Spanish	Paolo Cassella and Totò Savio. Cover of the Italian-language song "Maledetta primavera".	
=== Z ===
"Bakit Pa?"	Jessa Zaragoza	1997	Tagalog	Written and produced by Vehnee Saturno	

== See also ==
- Honorific nicknames in popular music
- Subject (music)
- Theme music
- Trademark look
