= Patricio Castillo =

Patricio Castillo may refer to:

- Patricio Castillo (actor, born 1974), Spanish-Chilean voice actor, singer and songwriter
- Patricio Castillo (actor, born 1940) (1940–2021), Chilean-born Mexican actor
- Patricio Castillo (folk musician) (born 1946), Chilean musician
