= Estadio Chile (poem) =

1973 poem credited to Víctor Jara

- by Víctor Jara
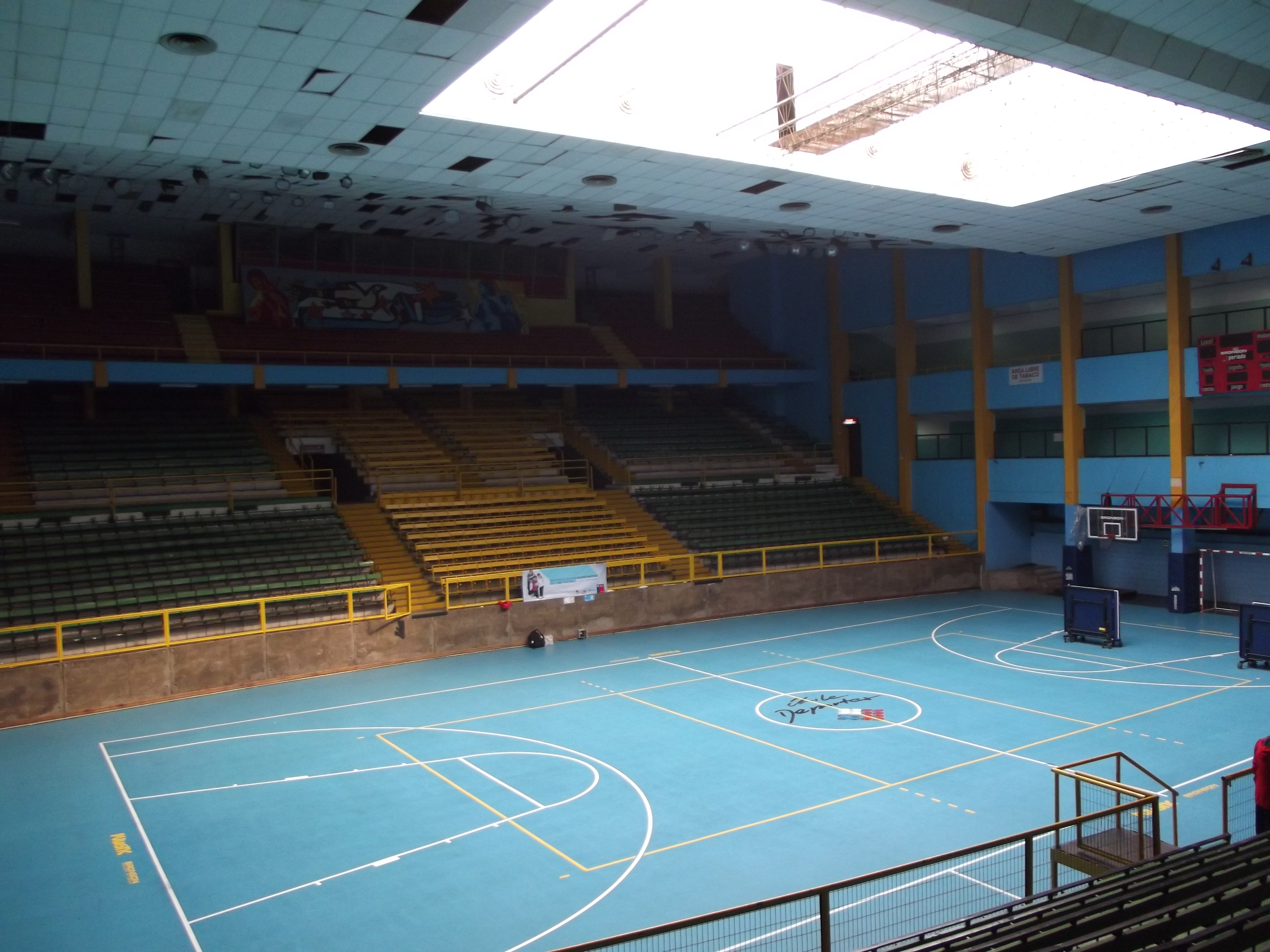
- The eponymous stadium, where Jara wrote the poem and died
- Translator: Joan Jara
- Written: 1973
- Language: Spanish

There are five thousand of us here
in this small part of the city.
We are five thousand.
I wonder how many we are in all
in the cities and in the whole country?
...
How hard it is to sing
when I must sing of horror.
Horror which I am living,
horror which I am dying.
To see myself among so much
and so many moments of infinity
in which silence and screams
are the end of my song.

— Víctor Jara, "Estadio Chile"
(translated from Spanish)

"Estadio Chile", or "Somos Cinco Mil", is the common name of an untitled poem and song credited to Víctor Jara and penned in the days prior to his death. Jara was tortured and killed by the Chilean Army over several days in Santiago's Estadio Chile (renamed Estadio Víctor Jara in 2004) during the 1973 Chilean coup d'état.

== History ==
Víctor Jara was detained in Estadio Chile among thousands of others during the 1973 Chilean military coup against the Unidad Popular government, of which Jara was an icon. Jara, a popular folksinger, sang for the other detainees to maintain morale. Along with Andean and Chilean folk songs, he sang a "manifesto" composed his second night there. The militia recognized him for his song and fame and removed him from the crowd. The guards tore off his nails, smashed his hands, and ordered him to play the guitar.

He was found dead a week later with signs of brutal treatment and gunshot wounds. The "manifesto" survived through both the detainees who memorized the song and the scraps of paper containing Jara's handwritten lyrics. Jara's wife, Joan, presented her research into her husband's final days in her essays and 1984 memoir An Unfinished Song. The poem stretches the entrance to the Museum of Memory and Human Rights in Santiago.

== Interpretation ==
In The Meaning of Human Suffering, Dr. Joel Gajardo-Velasquez compares the final line of the poem to the message of the cross: that Jara was able to see "the new that will be born in spite of, and probably especially because of, his personal tragedy", as "suffering without hope is death without resurrection".

== Response ==
Naín Nómez placed the poem as the first in a series of semi-anonymous works distributed by hand and designed to challenge the new Chilean state of affairs after the 1973 coup. He cited the poem as an example of poesía de la conciencia outside of the avant-garde tradition. In Resisting Alienation, Christopher Michael Travis writes that the poem "poignantly understates the effect of 'Auschwitz' on artistic expression". Valerie Alia wrote in Media Ethics and Social Change that Jara's poem itself told the story of the coup and Jara's own unbroken spirit before his death.

== See also ==
- Human rights violations in Pinochet's Chile
- Human rights in Chile
