= Pongo en tus manos abiertas =

Studio album by Víctor Jara
- Released: June 1969
- Recorded: 1969
- Venue: Santiago, Chile
- Genre: Nueva canción chilena; protest
- Length: 41:23
- Label: Jota Jota
- Producer: Víctor Jara

Víctor Jara chronology
Canciones folklóricas de América (1967)	Pongo en tus manos abiertas (1969)	Canto libre (1970)

Pongo en tus manos abiertas ("I Put Into Your Open Hands") is the fourth studio album by Chilean singer-songwriter Víctor Jara, released in June 1969. It was the third release of the Jota Jota record label, created by the Communist Youth of Chile to publish recordings by artists of the Nueva canción chilena such as Quilapayún, who collaborated in the musical accompaniment of some songs.

For this album, he composed and sang more politicized songs than his predecessors, with some like "A Luis Emilio Recabarren" in which he pays tribute to the founder of the Communist Party of Chile or "Preguntas por Puerto Montt" in which he condemns the massacre perpetrated in that city and the Minister of the Interior, Edmundo Pérez Zujovic. It has been the most praised album of his career, being considered the fifth best Chilean album by Rolling Stone magazine.

== Background ==
During 1968, he visited different places in the United States, in New York, he offered a recital on a Hispanic television channel while in California, he visited the campus of the University of California, Berkeley close to San Francisco and University of California, Los Angeles. During his performances he exposed his "Marxist vision" of Latin American reality and also used a projector that allowed the audience to see the lyrics of his songs in English. In England, he was invited by the British Council to carry out activities related to theater directing. "Te recuerdo Amanda", one of the songs on the album, was written during this time.

== Recording ==
Pongo en tus manos abiertas was recorded when he returned from his works in theatrical productions in England. It contains a much more direct political proposal than that of his predecessors, which he was able to carry out without problems on the then Jota Jota label (later known as Discoteca del Cantar Popular, "DICAP"). It was created by the Communist Youth to grant production and dissemination spaces to groups and soloists of the Nueva canción chilena. Among the first works done on that label is X Vietnam (1968) by Chilean group Quilapayún, who would participate in the recording of the album. In ""Móvil" Oil Special", they embody the students who star in the song and also contribute to its Son cubano rhythm while in "A Cochabamba me voy" they provide choruses that mark their Guaracha rhythm.

== Composition ==
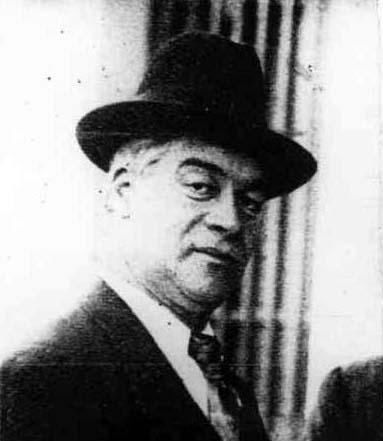
Luis Emilio Recabarren, the founder of the Communist Party who is honored in the album

In this album, like his predecessors, Jara maintains the tradition of composing five of his own songs, "A Luis Emilio Recabarren" is one of them and is dedicated to the founder of the Communist Party, Luis Emilio Recabarren. "A desalambrar" is a song which criticizes the labor exploitation of poor peasants by rich landowners and foreign corporations. "Camilo Torres", originally titled "Cruz de Luz", is a tribute song to the Colombian priest Camilo Torres Restrepo which, like "A desalambrar" were composed by the Uruguayan singer-songwriter Daniel Viglietti. Jara also sang the Latin American lullaby, "Duerme, duerme negrito" collected by Atahualpa Yupanqui. "Juan Sin Tierra" is a tribute song to the Mexican revolutionary Emiliano Zapata written by Jorge Saldaña.

"Preguntas por Puerto Montt" is a song that condemns the Massacre of Puerto Montt perpetuated on March 9, 1969, in which they died 11 men, women, and children. In it, he also directly accuses the then Christian Democrat interior minister, Edmundo Pérez Zujovic for having ordered the massacre. While he was performing "Preguntas por Puerto Montt" in a presentation at the Saint George school in Santiago, he was attacked and beaten by students from said establishment.

In ""Móvil" Oil Special", he makes a play on words with the American oil company Mobil and Grupo Móvil, who were "feared special squads" of the Carabineros de Chile. The phrase "mata tire tirun din" is a play on words with the nursery rhyme "mandan dirun dirun dan". "If I Had a Hammer" written by Lee Hays and Pete Seeger was retitled "El Martillo". "Zamba del "Che"" is a tribute song to the Argentine guerrilla leader Che Guevara composed in 1967 by Rubén Ortiz Fernández. "Ya parte el galgo terrible" is a Sergio Ortega's composition for Pablo Neruda's play, Fulgor y muerte de Joaquin Murieta. "A Cochabamba me voy" is a "greeting to the guerrillas in Bolivia."

"Te recuerdo Amanda" is a romantic composition and at the same time a political anthem, it talks about the precarious working conditions of the workers and that the brief 5-minute break that this couple has at work is used to see each other. The names of the characters in the song were taken directly from their parents, Amanda Martínez and Manuel Jara. In his concert in Peru held on July 17, 1973, on the Peruvian television channel Panamericana Televisión, he explained that speaks of the love of two workers "from any factory, in any city, anywhere on our continent." "Te recuerdo amanda" initially appeared as the b-side of the "Plegaria a un labrador" single (included in the 1971 album, El derecho de vivir en paz). It has been covered by several artists including Fito Páez, Joaquín Sabina, Joan Baez, Silvio Rodríguez, Joan Manuel Serrat, Presuntos Implicados and Boom Boom Kid.

== Artwork ==
The album cover shows the "working hands" of Victor Jara. It was photographed by Mario Guillard and designed by Vicente and Antonio Larrea.

== Release ==
Pongo en tus manos abietas was released in June 1969 in Santiago on the Jota Jota label. Some editions released in Peru, Germany and Italy were titled Te recuerdo Amanda. The original editions were in monaural sound while later reissues were in stereo sound. In March 2001 it was reissued by Warner Records with the addition of six bonus tracks. In 2017, the album was reissued in vinyl format along with others by Jara such as Victor Jara (1966), El derecho de vivir en paz (1971), La Población (1972) and Manifiesto (1974).

== Critical reception ==
Professional ratings
Review scores
Source	Rating
AllMusic	4.5/5 stars

In retrospective reviews, Pongo en tus manos abiertas was highly praised. In Review Online, Paul Attard wrote that can be felt a "level of unity brimming on Jara's fourth studio album". He concluded by saying that "his songwriting would go on to inform folk-protest music more generally. However, what's most striking about his work are its parallels to this form, as it evolved across continents, with its stunning humanism never lost in translation."

Wilson Neate wrote in AllMusic, that the album "was his masterpiece" and "a landmark in the evolution of the nueva canción". He continued stating that "Jara's music blended indigenous instrumentation and folk forms with a contemporary singer/songwriter orientation" and that "his lyrical focus on land reform, organized labor, poverty, imperialism, and race specifically addressed Chile under Frei's presidency but also engaged with a Pan-American revolutionary consciousness and a global progressive awareness."

In a review of the 1974 edition, under the name Te Recuerdo Amanda, John Bush of AllMusic commented that "Jara's readings are so emotional, no knowledge of Spanish is necessary to understand his songs. There is some superficial distorsion to the material -- the result of a direct-form-phonograph transfer -- but the music is timeless." In 2008, the magazine Rolling Stone considered it the fifth best Chilean album of all time.

== Track listing ==
Side A

All tracks are written by Víctor Jara, except where indicated.

No.	Title	Writer(s)	Length
1.	"A Luis Emilio Recabarren"		2:49
2.	"A desalambrar"	Daniel Viglietti	1:36
3.	"Duerme, duerme negrito"		2:49
4.	"Juan Sin Tierra"	Jorge Saldaña	3:09
5.	"Preguntas por Puerto Montt"		2:39
6.	""Móvil" Oil Special"		2:46
Total length:			14:28

Side B

No.	Title	Writer(s)	Length
1.	"Camilo Torres"	Viglietti	3:04
2.	"El Martillo"	Pete Seeger; Lee Hays	2:49
3.	"Te recuerdo amanda"		2:33
4.	"Zamba del "Che""	Rubén Ortiz Fernández	3:39
5.	"Ya parte el galgo terrible"	Sergio Ortega	1:50
6.	"A Cochabamba me voy"		2:26
Total length:			16:27

=== 2001's extended version ===
Re-release from March, 2001 by Warner Records

No.	Title	Writer(s)	Length
1.	"Plegaria a un Labrador" (a single version composed by Jara with the group Quilapayun)	Víctor Jara; Patricio Castillo	3:02
2.	"Cueca de Joaquín Murieta"		1:36
3.	"Tonada para guitarra" (Live at the "Peña de los Parra" of 1970.)		1:14
4.	"Te Recuerdo Amanda" (Live at the "Peña de los Parra" of 1970.)		3:06
5.	"Plegaria a un Labrador" (Live at the "Peña de los Parra" of 1970.)	Jara; Castillo	3:32
6.	"El arado" (Live of 1970.)		3:48
Total length:			16:22

== Bibliography ==
- Rodríguez, Juan Pablo González; Vásquez, Oscar Ohlsen; Cruz, Claudio Rolle, Historia social de la música popular en Chile, 1950- 1970 (in Spanish), Ediciones UC, ISBN 978-956-14-2632-0
- Jara, Joan (1983), Victor: An Unfinished Song, Jonathan Cape Ltd., ISBN 0-224-01880-9
