= El derecho de vivir en paz =

Studio album by Víctor Jara
- Released: April 1971
- Genre: Nueva canción
- Length: 38:48
- Label: DICAP/Odeon
- Producer: Víctor Jara

Víctor Jara chronology
Canto libre (1970)	El derecho de vivir en paz (1971)	La Población (1972)

Singles from El derecho de vivir en paz
- 1. "El derecho de vivir en paz" Released: 1971; 2. "Ni chicha ni limoná" Released: 1971

El derecho de vivir en paz (The right to live in peace) is the sixth studio album by Chilean singer-songwriter Víctor Jara released in 1971 on DICAP and Odeon Records labels.

== Composition and recording ==
The title song was written by Jara in 1969, as he worked in the "Vietrock" play by Megan Terry. It is a protest song dedicated to the Vietnamese communist leader Ho Chi Minh, and criticism against Vietnam War. Its recording was in the RCA Studios in Santiago, and for the song, Victor invited the Chilean rock group Los Blops to play electric guitar, and organ.

It also used electric bass and drums, combined with progressions and scales typical of Andean music, in addition to incorporating other folk instruments such as the charango, the quena, the tarka and others. At first, the group was not well seen by the Popular Unity until Victor decided to record with them. The title track was first performed live in 1971 at the Teatro Marconi (current Teatro Nescafé de las Artes). "Abre la ventana" was addressed to a woman from the towns, and also counted on the collaboration of Los Blops. Victor musicalized the poem by Miguel Hernández, "El niño yuntero".

Peruvian composer Celso Garrido Lecca—member of the Generación del '50—helped Victor in the composition of "Vamos por ancho camino" and "B.R.P.", the latter is a tribute song to the Brigada Ramona Parra, composed together with Víctor Rojas. It also included a Peruvian traditional song, "A la molina no voy mas". "Las casitas del barrio alto" was based on Little Boxes by American singer-songwriter Malvina Reynolds. "El alma llena de banderas" was dedicated to the student Miguel Ángel Aguilera, who was 18 years old, was a member of the Brigada Ramona Parra and died in a demonstration in favor of the Popular Unity. Victor sang it for the second Festival of the Nueva Canción Chilena.

In "Ni chicha ni limoná", he called on all those who had not yet committed themselves to the government to join the revolution "where the potatoes burn". According to Roberto Ampuero, the song attacked Christian Democracy, because "we saw there a division between reformist-reactionaries and progressive reformists. Víctor Jara sang that the DC was «ni chicha ni limoná», and what we aspired to was to divide the DC to get the political center of the country to support the construction of socialism."

"Plegaria a un labrador" was premiered it with the live support of the Chilean group Quilapayún at the first Festival of the Nueva Canción Chilena, held in July 1969, it won first place. In the song "a worker of the land was emboldened in solidarity towards a better future, placing him at the center of his uplifting work, whose contact with nature made his job acquire mystical edges." The song begins as a "slow-tempo reflective piece" and then grows into a "fast-paced, fat-textured anthem." It was described as a "worker's prayer" and "a song crying out for democracy."

== Release ==
El derecho de vivir en paz was released in 1971 on DICAP and Odeon Records labels. In 1977, it was reissued by Movieplay. In 2017, the album was reissued in vinyl format along with others by Jara such as Victor Jara (1966), Pongo en tus manos abiertas (1969), La Población (1972) and Manifiesto (1974).

== Legacy ==
After the Pinochet regime took power in Chile, Victor Jara was subsequently tortured and murdered. In the wake of Jara’s death, "El derecho de vivir en paz" has since served as a chilling memento for the Chilean people. The song was widely sung by protesters during the 2019 Chilean protests including by a people's ensemble of almost a thousand guitarists. Subsequently to lend their support to the protesters, Chilean musicians living around the world released their own version on Facebook. Another rendition of the song was released by a Chilean all-stars ensemble with artists including Francisca Valenzuela, Mon Laferte and Gepe to show their support for the Chilean resistance.

== Track listing ==
Side one

All tracks are written by Víctor Jara, except where indicated.

No.	Title	Writer(s)	Length
1.	"El derecho de vivir en paz"		4:34
2.	"Abre la ventana"		3:55
3.	"La partida" (instrumental)		3:26
4.	"El niño yuntero"	Miguel Hernández	3:44
5.	"Vamos por ancho camino"	Víctor Jara; Celso Garrido Lecca	3:17
6.	"A la molina no voy mas" (Peruvian traditional song)		3:13

Side two

No.	Title	Writer(s)	Length
1.	"A Cuba"		3:59
2.	"Las casitas del barrio alto"	Malvina Reynolds	2:30
3.	"El alma llena de banderas"		4:00
4.	"Ni chicha ni limoná"		3:23
5.	"Plegaria a un labrador"		3:16
6.	"B.R.P."	Jara; Lecca; Víctor Rojas	3:14
Total length:			38:48

== Bibliography ==
- Mularski, Jedrek (28 November 2014). Music, Politics, and Nationalism In Latin America: Chile During the Cold War Era. Cambria Press. ISBN 978-1-62196-737-8.
- Schilkrut, Yael Adrea Zaliasnik (29 June 2017). Memoria inquieta (in Spanish). Fondo de Cultura Economica. ISBN 978-607-16-5120-4.
