= Tiempos que cambian =

Studio album by Víctor Jara
- Released: 1974
- Recorded: 1973
- Genres: Folk music Protest music
- Length: 36:58
- Labels: Odeon; Alerce; Warner
- Producer: Víctor Jara

Víctor Jara chronology
Canto por travesura (1973)	Tiempos que cambian (1974)	Manifiesto (1974)

Tiempos que cambian (Times That Change) was scheduled to be the ninth studio album by Chilean songwriter Víctor Jara as a soloist, but was left incomplete due to the murder of the songwriter by the Chilean military in the 1973 military coup d'état. Originally, the album was planned to be named Tiempos Nuevos (New Times), but later on the title was modified to the present version.

Although intended for release in 1974, it was released posthumously in Europe with numerous earlier songs added to complete the album. It was released in the UK as Manifiesto (Manifest), in France as Presente (Present) and in Spain as Canciones póstumas (Posthumous songs).

The Chilean music group Inti Illimani and the Chilean musician Patricio Castillo, of Quilapayún until 1971, also collaborated on the recording of this album. Several years later, Castillo returned to Quilapayún in a more definitive way. The vast majority of the songs were written by Víctor Jara, with the exception of "Aquí me quedo" (Here I stay), composed with Patricio Castillo.

The description below only shows the original songs Victor Jara left for this album.

== Track listing ==
All music is composed by Víctor Jara, unless otherwise stated.

Tiempos que cambian
No.	Title	Music	Length
1.	"Aquí me quedo"	Pablo Neruda, Patricio Castillo, Víctor Jara	3:01
2.	"Caicaivilú (o La serpiente luminosa)" (single A, 1972)		3:10
3.	"Cuando voy al trabajo"		3:53
4.	"Doncella encantada (o Huillimalón)" (single B, 1972)		4:19
5.	"Manifiesto"		4:29
6.	"Pimiento (o El Pimiento)"		3:55
7.	"Vientos del Pueblo"		2:37
Total length:			25:24
