= La Población =

Studio album by Víctor Jara
- Released: 1972
- Genre: Folk; protest
- Length: 38:48
- Label: DICAP; Odeon; Warner
- Producer: Víctor Jara

Víctor Jara chronology
El derecho de vivir en paz (1971)	La Población (1972)	Canto por travesura (1973)

La Población is the seventh studio album by Chilean singer-songwriter Víctor Jara, released in 1972 by DICAP, and Odeon labels.

== Composition ==
The album concept is "based on the history and life of Santiago's shantytown communities", and focuses on the poverty of the Chilean camps and workers. It also "gives a central role to children in the founding of this new popular urban space", "brilliantly described the set of practices and imaginaries that surrounded the emergence of the camps", and "has a correlation in the formal aspect of the album, where it is possible to listen to tunes, cuecas and marches, among other rhythms that account for the melodies that accompany different social identities."

Seven tracks were written by Jara and the Chilean writer Alejandro Sieveking, who had met in 1956 and were classmates at the University of Chile until 1960. "Herminda de la Victoria" recounts the moments prior to the seizure of those lands in the community of Barrancas, Pudahuel on March 16, 1967. The other artists which collaborated on the album were, Isabel Parra, Bélgica Castro, Huamarí, Cantamaranto, Pato Solovera, Pedro Yáñez and Benko.

== Release ==
La Población was released in 1972 by DICAP, and Odeon labels. It was reissued by Warner Records in 2001. In 2017, the album was reissued along with others by Jara such as Victor Jara (1966), Pongo en tus manos abiertas (1969), El derecho de vivir en paz (1971) and Manifiesto (1974).

== Track listing ==
All songs are written by Víctor Jara and seven by Alejandro Sieveking.

1. "Lo único que tengo"
2. "En el río Mapocho"
3. "Luchín"
4. "La toma - 16 marzo 1967"
5. "La carpa de las coligüillas"
6. "El hombre es un creador"
7. "Herminda de la Victoria"
8. "Sacando pecho y brazo"
9. "Marcha de los pobladores"
