= Museum of Memory and Human Rights =

Museum in Santiago, Chile

- Museo de la Memoria y los Derechos Humanos

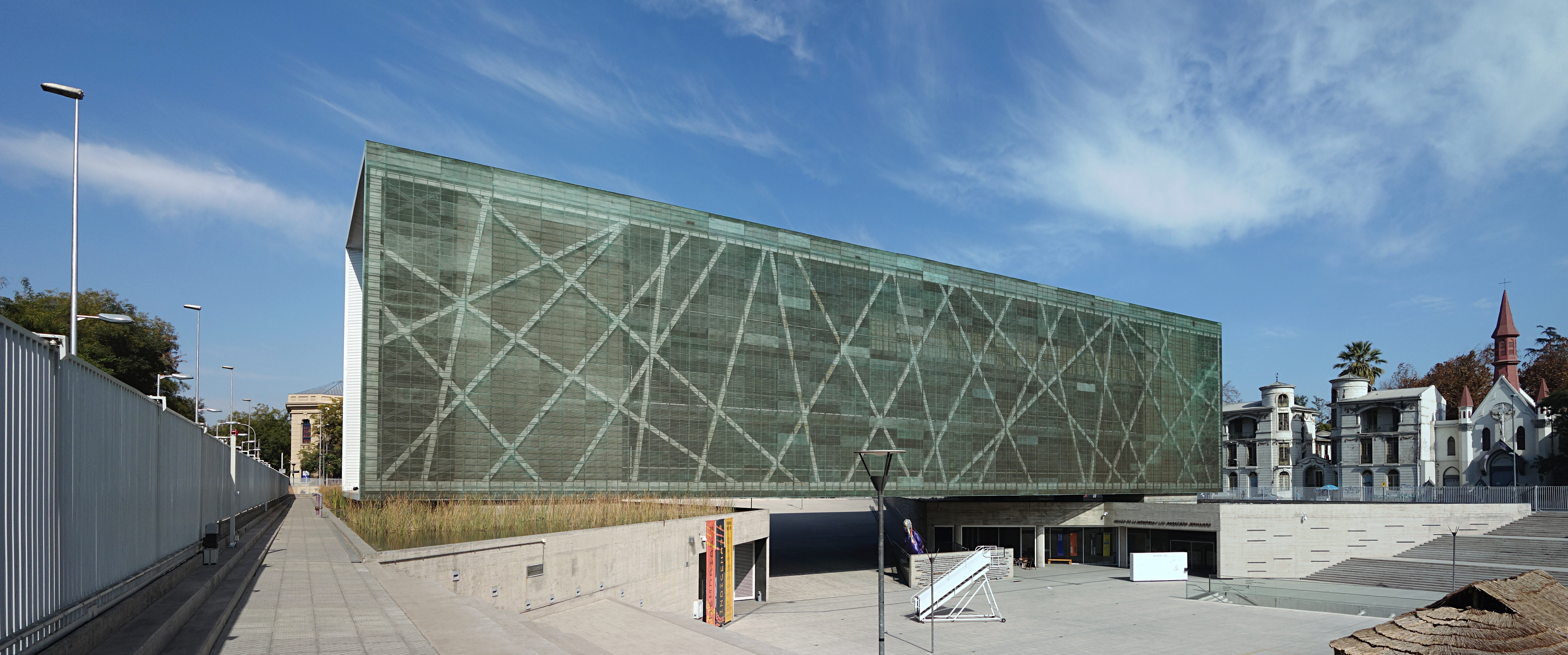
- Museum building.
- Established: 2010
- Location: Santiago, Chile
- Coordinates: 33°26′23″S 70°40′46″W
- Visitors: 150 000 per year
- Website: mmdh.cl

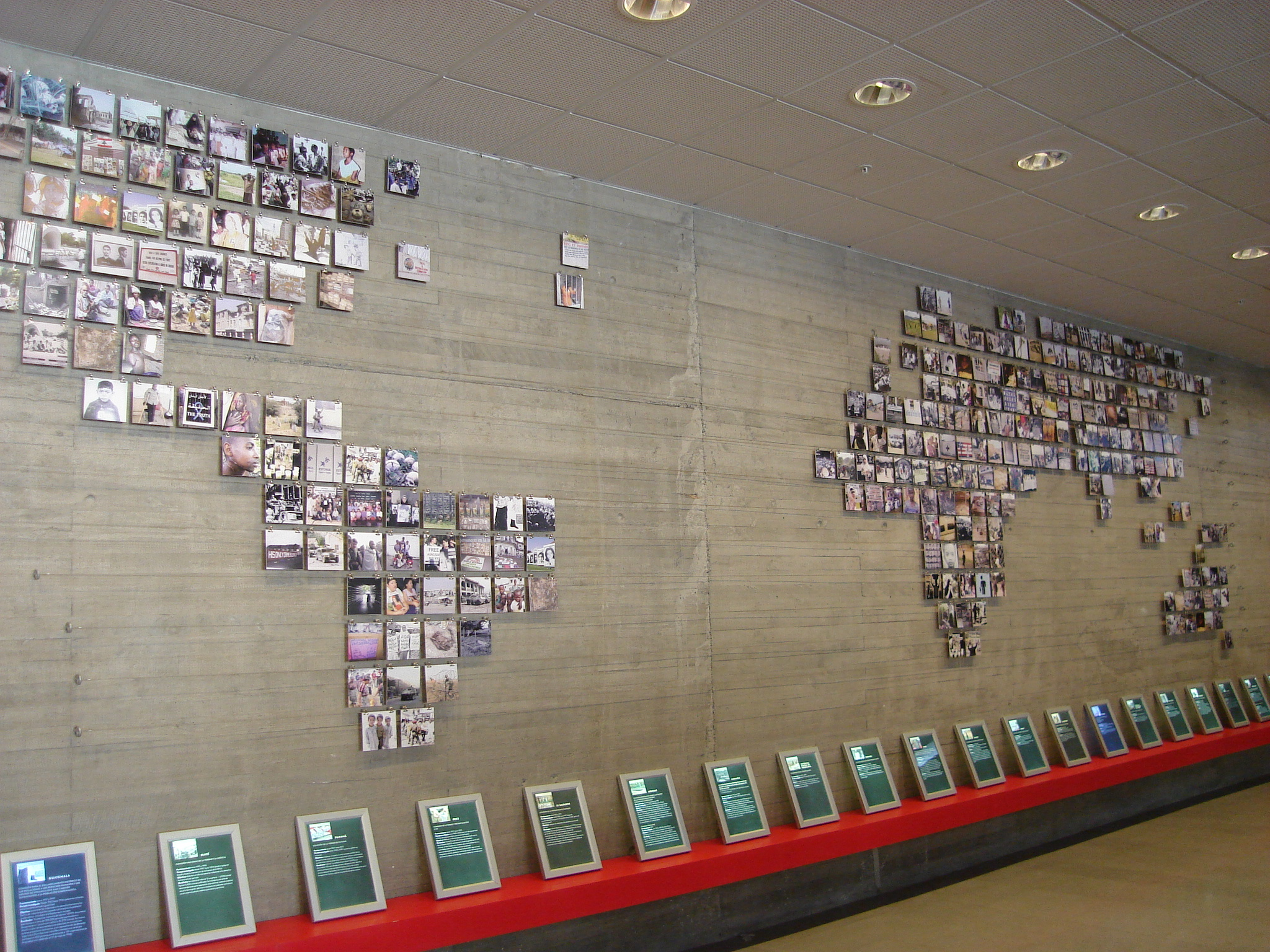
"Human rights, universal challenge" room.

The Museum of Memory and Human Rights (in Spanish: Museo de la Memoria y los Derechos Humanos) is a museum in Santiago, Chile, which commemorates the victims of human rights violations during the military dictatorship led by Augusto Pinochet between 1973 and 1990. It was inaugurated by then-president Michelle Bachelet on January 11, 2010, as part of government's commemoration of the bicentennial of Chile.

== History ==
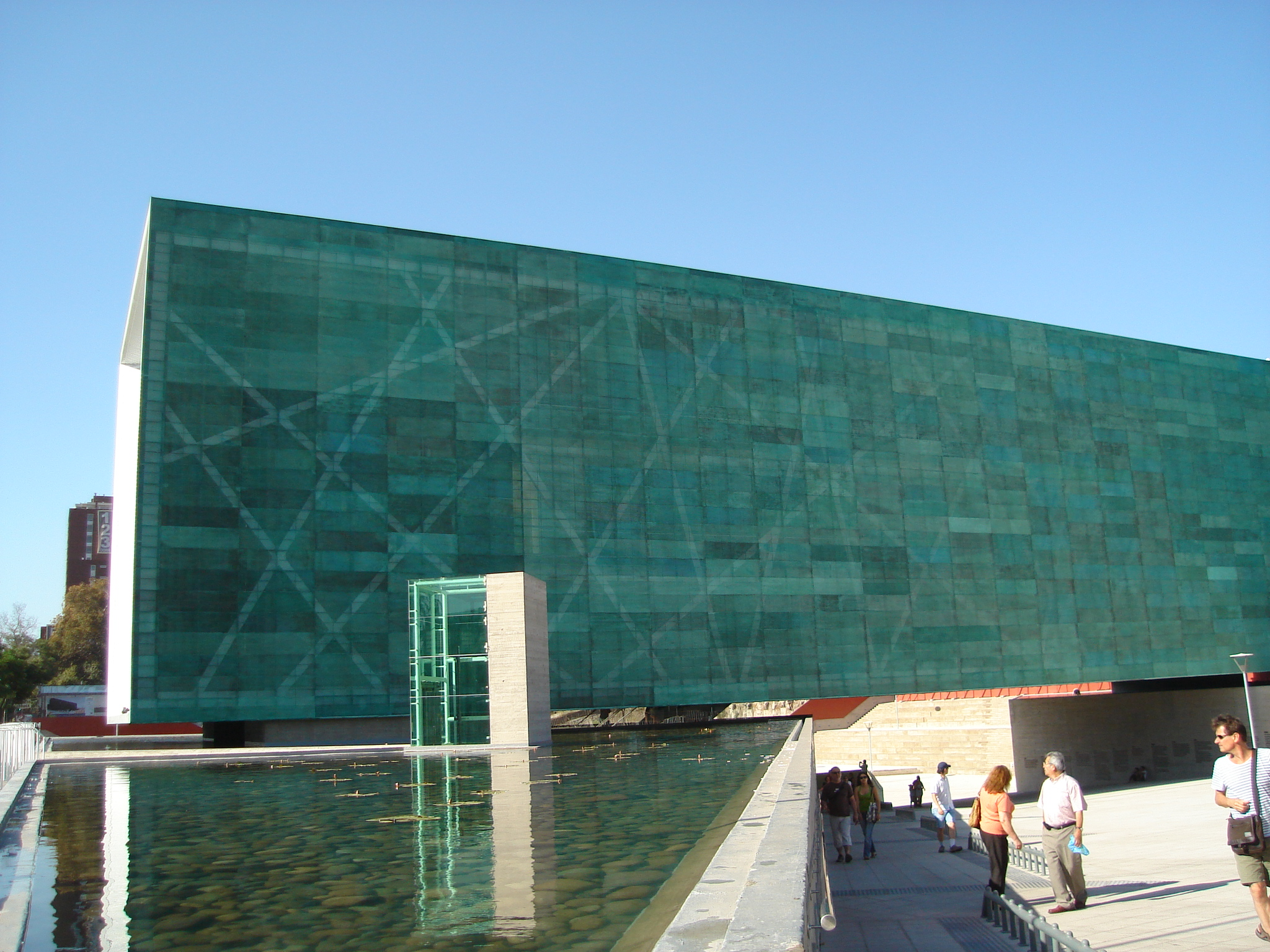
Building of the museum

In her speech on May 21, 2007, before the full Congress, President Michelle Bachelet announced the construction of a memorial museum, and a month later she announced a public competition to select an architectural design for it. On August 28 of that year, it was announced that the winning project belonged to a group of Brazilian architects from the office "Estudio America", located in São Paulo. In 2008, a contest to determine who would be in charge of the operation of the museum; "Árbol de Color S. A." was chosen.

The first stone of the museum was laid on December 10, 2008, by Bachelet, who was herself a victim of torture during the dictatorship of Pinochet. The materials and documentation for the museum's collection were mostly provided by the organization Casa de la Memoria, whose donations arrived on June 16, 2009, at the La Moneda Palace. Parallel to the construction of the museum, on December 3, 2009, the museum's board was formed, and on January 6, 2010, Romy Schmidt was appointed as its executive director. Bachelet inaugurated the museum on January 11, 2010, two months before the end of her term.

The museum houses torture devices used during the Pinochet dictatorship, letters to family members by prisoners in detention centers, newspaper clippings, and testimony from survivors. The museum also includes a philosophical examination of human rights. Chilean popular icon and folksinger Víctor Jara's last poem, Estadio Chile, written shortly before his death in the stadium during the 1973 coup, sprawls across the entrance to the museum.

In 2013, the Foundation Museo de la Memoria and the Inter-American Court of Human Rights signed an agreement to established a network of institutions dedicated to this theme. The agreement was to include joint conferences and seminars, as well as interchange of officials, professional practices, research and publication.

According to a 2021 study of the impact of the museum on visitors, "Chilean university students [who visit the museum subsequently] display greater support for democratic institutions, are more likely to reject institutions associated with the repressive period, and are more supportive of restorative transitional justice policies after visiting regardless of their ideological priors. We test for the persistence of these results and find that some of the effects endure for six months following the museum visit. We find support for the notion that emotional appeals deployed in the museum can shift citizen attitudes, which might have implications for processes of reconciliation."

== See also ==
- Human rights violations of the Chilean dictatorship
- Forced disappearance
- Human rights in Chile
- List of museums in Chile
