= Amerindios =

Chilean folk music group

- Origin: Santiago, Chile
- Genres: Folk, Nueva Canción, Chilean music
- Years active: 1969–1973
- Members: Julio Numhauser; Mario Salazar; Patricio Castillo

Amerindios was a folk music group from Chile which was active in the years between 1969 and 1973. It was one of the many artists of the Nueva Canción movement, but unlike many other Nueva Canción artists, Amerindios also incorporated instruments such as electric guitars. The group was formed in Santiago in 1969 by Mario Salazar and one of the three founders of Quilapayún, Julio Numhauser. Patricio Castillo joined the group later in 1971, two years before the group broke up.

== Discography ==
- 1970 - Amerindios
- 1973 - Tu sueño es mi sueño, tu grito es mi canto
