= Víctor Jara Stadium =

Sports complex in Santiago, Chile

Coordinates: 33°27′02.78″S 70°40′28.58″W

Estadio Víctor Jara
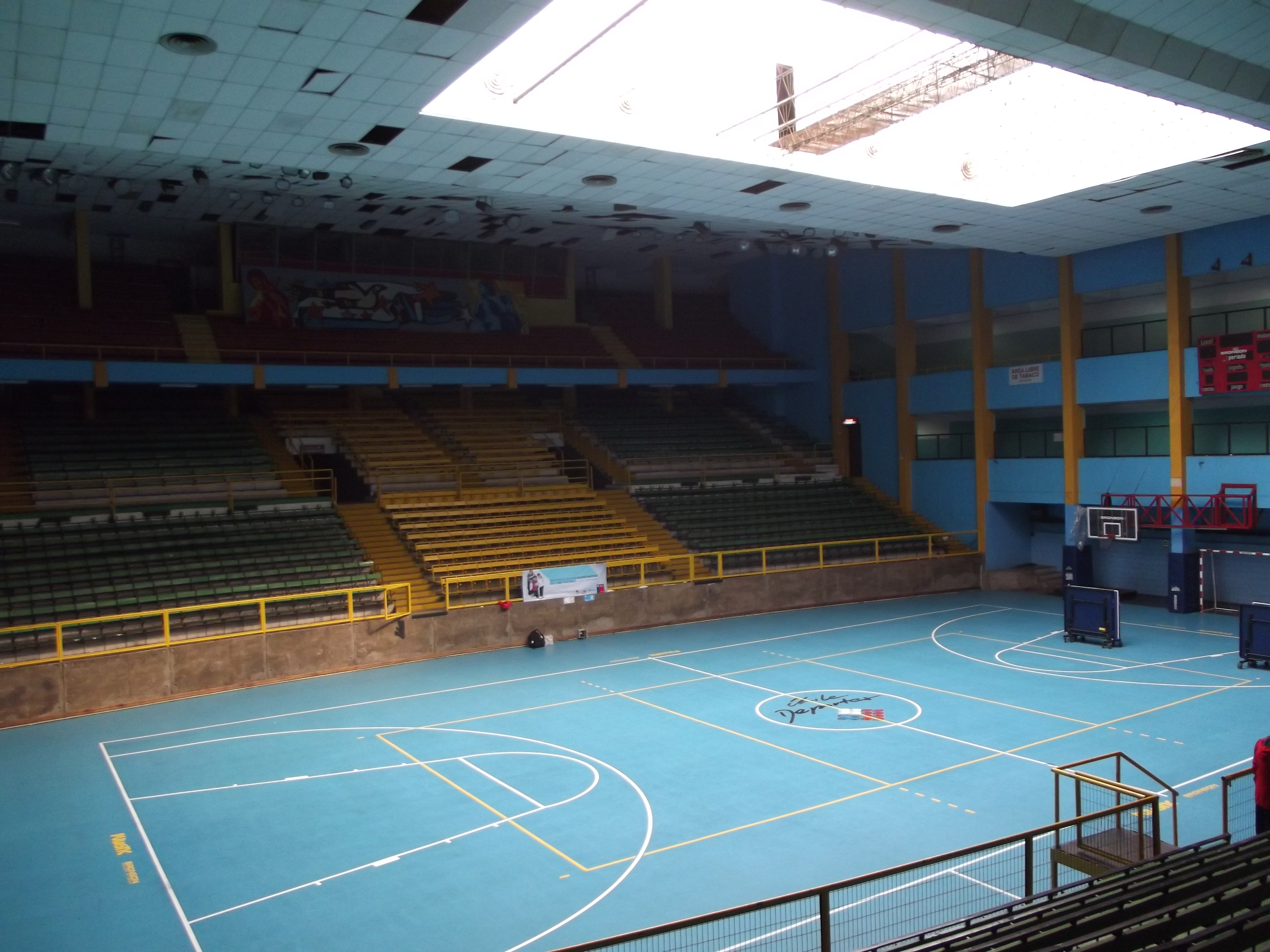
- Interior view of Víctor Jara Stadium
- Interactive map of Estadio Víctor Jara
- Former names: Estadio Chile (1949–2004)
- Location: Santiago, Chile
- Capacity: 3,500

Construction
- Opened: 1969
- Architects: Mario Recordón and Jorge Patiño

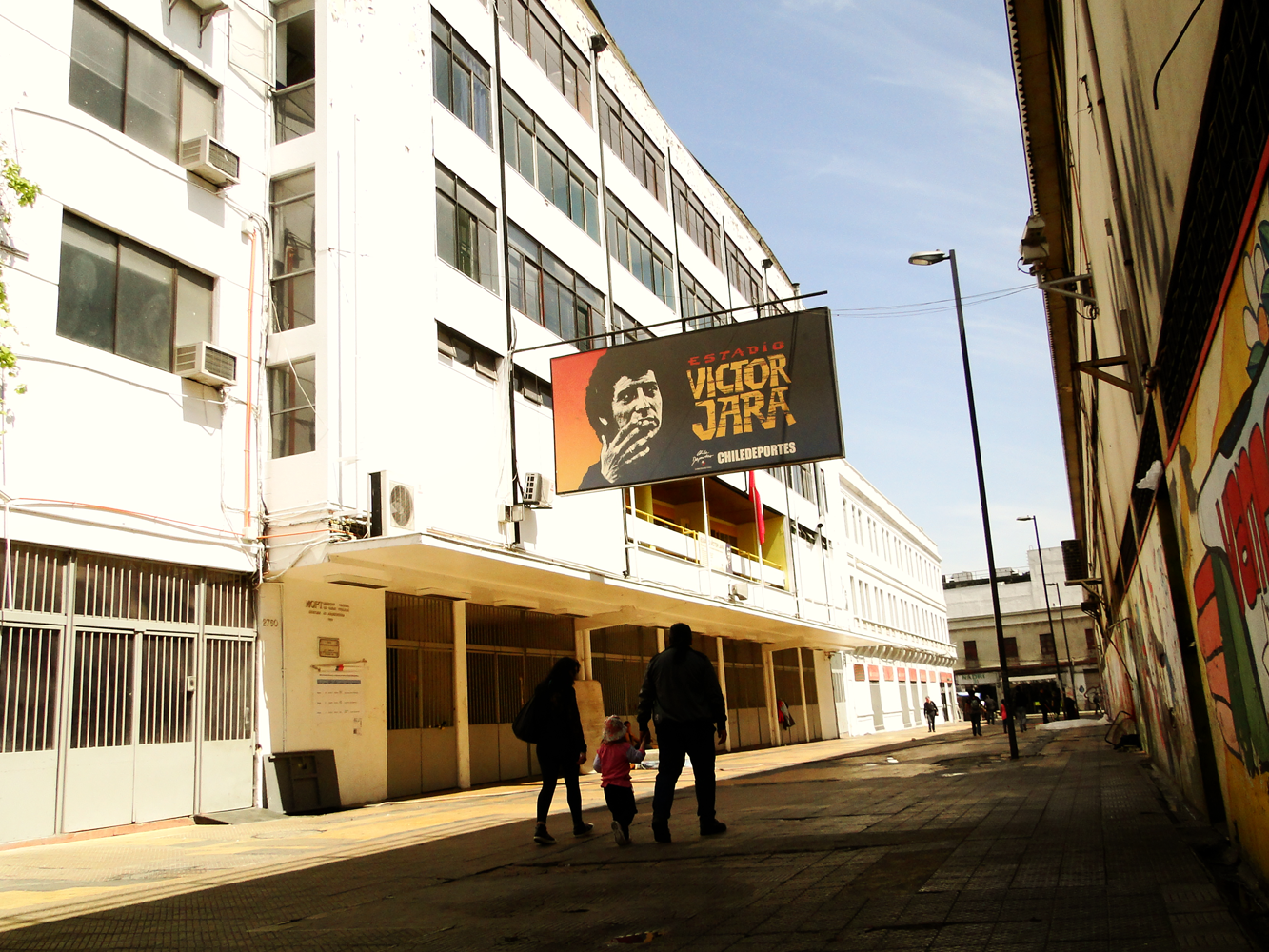
Outside view of Víctor Jara Stadium

Estadio Víctor Jara is an indoor multi-use sports complex located in the western part of Santiago, Chile, near the Estación Central and Alameda Avenue. It has a total capacity for an audience of 6,500 people. After the Chilean coup of 1973, it was used as a detention centre; about 3,000 people were killed there, including singer and songwriter Víctor Jara. The stadium, originally named "Chile Stadium", was renamed Victor Jara Stadium in 2003. The Stadium held many sporting events along with concerts and festivals.

Estadio Chile (lit. 'Chile Stadium') was designed in the rationalist style and inaugurated in 1969; its construction began in 1949 and is the work of the architect Mario Recordón Burnier, with the collaboration of the architect Jorge Patiño. It has a pulastic court where basketball, indoor soccer and volleyball can be played. International table tennis championships have also been held, and in the past it was used for boxing. In addition, it has a sports residence that can accommodate up to 185 athletes.

The stadium features a steel truss supported roof and a rubber based playing surface, which has a polyurethane layer on top. The walls are of reinforced concrete, 30 cm (12 in) in thickness. It also has facilities to lodge athletes. Complete with dormitories, dressing rooms, a clinic, dining rooms and even a casino; Chile stadium was the first indoor sports setting developed in the country.

== Concerts and festivals ==
In the venue, the Festival of the nueva canción chilena was held between 1969 and 1971, where in 1969, Víctor Jara won first place with the song "Plegaria a un labrador". In 1970 the Santa María de Iquique cantata by Luis Advis as performed by Quilapayún was premiered. Other performances in the Festival of the nueva cancion chilena included Inti-Illimani, Angel, Isabel Parra, Payo Grondona and Patricio Manns.

In 1991, a festival called Free song: Purification days at the Chile Stadium (Canto Libre: Jornadas de Purificacion el Estadio Chile) was held to commemorate the victims of the Chile Stadium. Together, approximately 800 artists including musicians, painters and poets met up and held a service. More recently in 2018–2019, a Festival of Art and Memory was held to celebrate Victor Jara's art and contributions.

== Use as a detention center ==
After the Chilean coup of 1973 organized by the Chilean Army, who overthrew the socialist government of Salvador Allende, Victor Jara was found at the Universidad Tecnica del Estado and together with Littre Quiroga, the general director of the National Directorate of Prisons, and other detainees was held at the Estadio Chile, which was being used as a detention center. Roughly 14,000 people were held at the stadium in the early months of the coup, 3,000 being killed. Between November and July of 1974, Estadio Chile was the main detention center being used by the Pinochet Regime.

Both Jara and Quiroga were tortured and killed at the Estadio Chile on 15 September 1973. Before his death, Jara wrote an untitled poem known as "Estadio Chile" and also as "Somos cinco mil"; later it would come into the hands of his wife Joan Jara.

== Victor Jara Stadium today ==
Today the stadium is owned by the Chilean government, and largely controlled by the Ministry for Sport. In 2008, the Victor Jara foundation argued to the Council of National Monuments in Chile that the sports complex should be considered a National Monument. Victor Jara Stadium provided a shelter for the homeless during the winter months in the 2000s. Recently, the stadium was used as an immigration office.
