= Canto por travesura =

Studio album by Víctor Jara
- Released: 1973
- Recorded: 1973
- Genres: Folk music Protest music
- Length: 39:13
- Labels: Odeon; Alerce; Warner
- Producer: Víctor Jara

Víctor Jara chronology
| La Población (1972) | Canto por travesura (1973) | Tiempos que cambian (1974) |

Canto por travesura (Mischievous Songs) is an album recorded by Víctor Jara in 1973. It consists of a collection of southern Chilean folk songs with a consistent thematic style popular in Chilean folklore—the mocking of social norms with mischievous jokes, riddles and dark humor.

== Track listing ==
=== Side one ===
All music is composed by Folklore chileno, unless otherwise stated.

Lado A
| No. | Title | Length |
|---|---|---|
| 1. | "Brindis" | 0:52 |
| 2. | "La palmatoria" | 3:13 |
| 3. | "Vengan a mi casamiento" | 3:20 |
| 4. | "Iba yo para una fiesta" | 2:16 |
| 5. | "La edad de la mujer" | 2:22 |
| 6. | "La cafetería" | 2:05 |
| Total length: | | 14:08 |

=== Side two ===
All music is composed by Folklore chileno, unless otherwise stated.

Lado B
| No. | Title | Music | Length |
|---|---|---|---|
| 1. | "La diuca" | Víctor Jara | 2:44 |
| 2. | "La fonda" | | 3:03 |
| 3. | "Por un pito ruin" | | 4:34 |
| 4. | "La beata" | | 2:33 |
| 5. | "Adivinanzas" | | 0:56 |
| 6. | "El chincolito" | | 1:52 |
| Total length: | | | 15:42 |

=== 2001 reissue bonus tracks ===
Bonus track de 2001
| No. | Title | Music | Length |
|---|---|---|---|
| 13. | "La remolienda, pieza uno" | Víctor Jara | 1:04 |
| 14. | "La remolienda, pieza dos" | Víctor Jara | 1:14 |
| 15. | "La remolienda, pieza tres" | Víctor Jara | 1:37 |
| 16. | "La remolienda, pieza cuatro" | Víctor Jara | 0:57 |
| 17. | "La remolienda, pieza cinco" | Víctor Jara | 1:31 |
| 18. | "Pepe Mendigo (o Cuento de Navidad)" (music for Los Mimos de Noisvander, 1965) | Víctor Jara | 11:14 |
| Total length: | | | 17:37 |
