= Tu sueño es mi sueño, tu grito es mi canto =

Tu Sueño Es Mi Sueño, Tu Grito Es Mi Canto

Studio album by Amerindios
- Released: 1973
- Genre: Folk, Folk rock, Nueva canción, Chilean music
- Label: IRT

Amerindios chronology
Amerindios (1970)	Tu Sueño Es Mi Sueño, Tu Grito Es Mi Canto (1973)

Tu Sueño Es Mi Sueño, Tu Grito Es Mi Canto (English: Your Dream Is My Dream, Your Cry Is My Song) is the second and final studio album by the folk music group Amerindios.

== Track listing ==
1. "El barco de papel"
2. "Los colihues"
3. "Mis raices heridas" (with Bernardo Dewers)
4. "Los niños cuando niños"
5. "Valparaiso 4 A.M. / Cueca beat"
6. "A pie camino"
7. "¡No!"
8. "Mi rio"
9. "Ahora"
10. "Ni pocos, ni muchos"
11. "La cervecita"
12. "Sin nombre"
