= 20 Años Después =

Compilation album by Víctor Jara
- Released: 1992
- Recorded: Madrid, Spain
- Genre: Folk; latin music
- Length: 41:07
- Label: Fonomusic

Víctor Jara chronology
Todo Víctor Jara (1992)	20 Años Después (1992)	Víctor Jara presente, colección "Haciendo Historia (1997)

Professional ratings
Review scores
Source	Rating
AllMusic	3/5 stars

20 Años Después (English: 20 Years Later) is a compilation music album by Chilean singer-songwriter Víctor Jara. It was released in Spain by Fonomusic in 1992 and was re-edited in 1998 with the 13th original track, "El Aparecido", omitted from the original compilation.

== Track listing ==
All tracks are written by V. Jara, except where extrad.

No.	Title	English translation	Length
1.	"El Derecho de Vivir en Paz"	The right to live in peace	4:29
2.	"El Alma Llena de Banderas"	The soul full of flags	3:55
3.	"Ni Chicha, Ni Limoná"	Nor chicha, nor lemonade	1:40
4.	"Casitas del Barrio Alto" (M. Reynolds; Adap: V. Jara)	Little houses of high neighborhood	2:24
5.	"A Cochabamba me Voy"	I am going to Cochabamba	2:21
6.	"Te Recuerdo Amanda"	I remember you Amanda	2:23
7.	"Duerme, Duerme Negrito" (A. Yupanqui; Adap: V. Jara)	Sleep little blackie	2:42
8.	"A Desalambrar" (Daniel Viglietti)		1:28
9.	"A La Molina No Voy Mas"	I won’t go back to the mill	3:06
10.	"Luchín"		3:17
11.	"Manifiesto"	Manifesto	4:23
12.	"Vengan a Mi Casamiento" (Trad./Adap:V. Jara)	Come to my wedding	3:20
13.	"El Aparecido"	The Apparition	2:16
14.	"Paloma Quiero Contarte"	Paloma, I want to tell you	3:00
