= Hernán Chacón Soto =

Chilean military officer (died 2023)

Hernán Chacón Soto (c. 1937 – 29 August 2023) was a Chilean military officer who held the rank of Brigadier in the Chilean Army.

In July 2018, he was convicted, with seven others, of participating in the kidnapping, torture and murder of Víctor Jara and Littre Quiroga in 1973.

On 28 August 2023, these sentences were upheld by the Supreme Court of Chile, and Soto and six others were sentenced to fifteen years in Punta Peuco Prison. On 29 August, the same morning he was due to be arrested and transferred to prison, Soto, at the age of 86, committed suicide by gunshot.
