= Canto libre =

Studio album by Víctor Jara
- Released: 1970
- Genre: Folk; protest
- Length: 37:43
- Label: Odeon
- Producer: Víctor Jara

Víctor Jara chronology
| Pongo en tus manos abiertas (1969) | Canto libre (1970) | El derecho de vivir en paz (1971) |

Canto libre is the fifth studio album by Chilean singer-songwriter Víctor Jara, released in 1970 by Odeon. In this album, he had the support of Inti-Illimani and Patricio Castillo.

== Background and recording ==
In 1969, he had released Pongo en tus manos abiertas, an album that «begins the protest work in full swing and with it intensely promotes Salvador Allende's presidential candidacy. Along with other singers he is part of the group called "the nueva canción chilena".» In the recording of this album, Victor had the accompaniment of Patricio Castillo, and Chilean group Inti-Illimani, that he met in 1967 while he was directing La remolienda.

== Artwork ==
Rubén Nouzeilles was in charge of the artistic direction. For the cover of the album "he insisted that the cover be the close-up of a rickety padlocked door, so that when the cover was opened a dove seemed to fly out of the interior."

== Release ==
Canto libre was released in 1970 by Odeon. In Spain, it was released in 1978 by Movieplay, and by Fonomusic in 1986 and 1994. In 1981, it was released by Pläne in Germany, and in 1993, it was re-issued by Monitor Records label in Chile.

== Reception ==
Professional ratings
Review scores
| Source | Rating |
|---|---|
| AllMusic | 4.5/5 stars |

Australian newspaper The Sydney Morning Herald felt that the album "is a very bright piece of music using primitive folk music instruments of Latin America." arwulf arwulf wrote in AllMusic that "Jara sang beautifully, always expressing his thoughts and viewpoints with unflinching honesty, playing his guitar alone or surrounded by folk musicians from nations and cultures all over Latin America." He also added that "Jara's egalitarian discipline of cultural solidarity is manifest at various points in this collection" and "Victor Jara's spirit transcends all language barriers. Like his voice and the instrumentation, the poetry is tremendously moving".

== Track listing ==
1. "Inga" - (Peruvian folk)
2. "Canción del arbol del olvido" - (A. Ginastero - F. Silva Valdez)
3. "La pala" - (Victor Jara)
4. "Lamento borincano" - (R. Hernández)
5. "Ventolera" (Instrumental) - (Victor Jara)
6. "El tinku" - (Bolivian tonada)
7. "Angelita Huenuman" - (Victor Jara)
8. "Corrido de Pancho Villa" - (Mexican folk)
9. "Caminando, caminando" - (Victor Jara)
10. "Quién mató a Carmencita" - (Victor Jara)
11. "Canto libre" - (Victor Jara)

== Legacy ==
In September 2018, Mil Guitarras para Victor Jara was held, in which songs from the album such as "Angelita Huenuman", "Ingá", "La Pala" and its homonymous song were interpreted. The album title was used in various tributes to Victor and Chilean music. In December 9, 2018, a free event was held at University of Chile, Estación Central named after the title of the album, Canto Libre: una avenida para Victor Jara. In 2020, a tribute to Chilean music was entitled "La ruta del canto libre" and held in the General Cemetery. The event honored Rolando Alarcón, Violeta Parra, Eduardo "Gato" Alquinta, Sergio Ortega, Roberto Parra and Jara. In 2022, it was made again, on this occasion he honored Nino Garcia, Willy Oddo from Quilapayún, Richard Rojas, Ester Gonzalez from Duo Lonqui.
