= 2644 Victor Jara =

Main-belt asteroid

Discovery
- Discovered by: N. Chernykh
- Discovery site: Crimean Astrophysical Obs.
- Discovery date: 22 September 1973

Designations
- Named after: Víctor Jara (Chilean singer and composer)
- Alternative designations: 1973 SO_{2} · 1979 HD
- Minor planet category: main-belt · (inner) background

Orbital characteristics
- Epoch 23 March 2018 (JD 2458200.5)
- Uncertainty parameter 0
- Observation arc: 64.04 yr (23,389 d)
- Aphelion: 2.5286 AU
- Perihelion: 1.8116 AU
- Semi-major axis: 2.1701 AU
- Eccentricity: 0.1652
- Orbital period (sidereal): 3.20 yr (1,168 d)
- Mean anomaly: 10.705°
- Mean motion: 0° 18^{m} 29.88^{s} / day
- Inclination: 2.6810°
- Longitude of ascending node: 347.62°
- Argument of perihelion: 309.35°

Physical characteristics
- Mean diameter: 5.914±0.223 km
- Geometric albedo: 0.153±0.021
- Absolute magnitude (H): 13.3

2644 Victor Jara, provisional designation 1973 SO_{2}, is an asteroid from the inner regions of the asteroid belt, approximately 6 kilometers (3.7 miles) in diameter. It was discovered on 22 September 1973, by Soviet-Russian astronomer Nikolai Chernykh at the Crimean Astrophysical Observatory in Nauchnij, on the Crimean peninsula. It was named after Chilean singer and composer Víctor Jara.

== Orbit and classification ==
Victor Jara is a non-family asteroid of the main belt's background population. It orbits the Sun in the inner main-belt at a distance of 1.8–2.5 AU once every 3 years and 2 months (1,168 days; semi-major axis of 2.17 AU). Its orbit has an eccentricity of 0.17 and an inclination of 3° with respect to the ecliptic.

The body's observation arc begins with a precovery taken at the Palomar Observatory in April 1954, or nearly 20 years prior to its official discovery observation.

== Physical characteristics ==
=== Diameter and albedo ===
According to the survey carried out by the NEOWISE mission of NASA's Wide-field Infrared Survey Explorer, Victor Jara measures 5.914 kilometers in diameter and its surface has an albedo of 0.153.

=== Rotation period ===
As of 2018, no rotational lightcurve of Victor Jara has been obtained from photometric observations. The body's rotation period, pole and shape remain unknown.

== Naming ==
This minor planet was named by the discoverer after Chilean folk singer and activist Víctor Jara, who was assassinated on 16 September 1973, just six days prior to the planet's discovery. The official naming citation was published by the Minor Planet Center on 15 May 1984 (M.P.C. 8800).

Víctor Jara, a prominent communist political activist in Chile, toured the Soviet Union in the 1960s and praised its culture, its scientific achievements and the friendliness of its working people. He was tortured and murdered shortly after the 1973 Chilean coup d'état led by Army Commander-in-Chief Augusto Pinochet, that ended the government of the socialist Salvador Allende.
