= Patricio Castillo (actor, born 1974) =

American actor

Patricio Castillo (born February 4, 1974) is a Spanish-Chilean vocal actor, performer, singer and songwriter. He became well known for his roles in the Spanish language performing songs for HBO's Flight of the Conchords, Happy Feet, Charlie and the Chocolate Factory and Corpse Bride. He currently works as the lead vocalist for Los Foreigner, the classic Rock Foreigner experience band.

== Biography ==
Patricio Castillo was born Patricio Fernando Castillo Espinoza on February 3, 1974, in Rancagua, Chile.

=== Career ===
In 2007, Castillo was signed as the Spanish voice of Bret McKenzie in HBO television series Flight of the Conchords, as well to co-writing the Spanish lyrics working with songwriter Claudia Castillo and sound Engineer "Waldo Valenzuela". After successfully completing 12 episodes with a total of 30 songs re-written in Spanish, Castillo and Valenzuela joined McKenzie and Jemaine Clement on their first LA show to performance at the El Rey Theater on July 11, 2007, where the Spanish Conchords sang "Think Think about" (Pien Piensa un Poco).

=== Personal life ===
Castillo married Claudia Castillo on November 28, 2003, in Los Angeles, California. The couple have two children: Cassandra Alexis Castillo - June 21, 2008 and Penelope Naomi Castillo - May 4, 2013
