= Joan Jara =

British-Chilean dancer and activist (1927–2023)

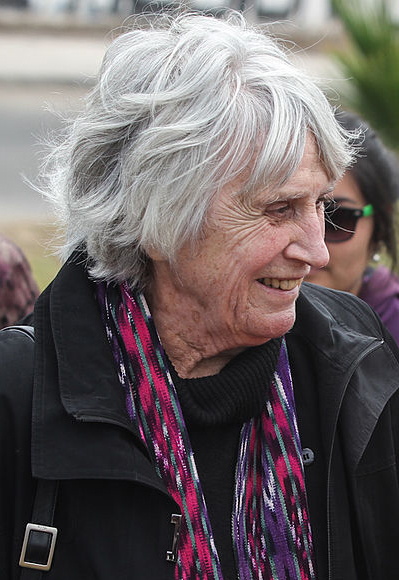
- Jara in 2012
- Born: Joan Alison Turner; 20 July 1927; London, England
- Died: 12 November 2023 (aged 96); Santiago, Chile
- Occupations: Dancer, political activist
- Spouses: Patricio Bunster (m. 1950; div. 1960) Víctor Jara (m. 1960; died 1973)
- Children: 2

Joan Alison Turner Roberts (born Joan Alison Turner, 20 July 1927 – 12 November 2023), known as Joan Jara or Joan de Jara was a British-Chilean dancer, activist, and widow of Chilean icon and esteemed folk songwriter Víctor Jara. After his death, she dedicated herself to perpetuating the memory of him, his work, and his values. She wrote An Unfinished Song: The Life of Victor Jara in 1984, and founded the Víctor Jara Foundation.

== Early life and career ==
Joan Alison Turner was born in London, England, on 20 July 1927. She met Víctor Jara at the University of Chile in 1961: he studied theatre and she gave dance classes in the theatre school. At this time, Joan also danced in the national ballet. When she was recovering from an illness once, Víctor brought her flowers that she surmises he stole from the park due to his budget. Joan had a daughter less than a year old at this time from a previous husband, from whom she was separated. The daughter and Víctor were close.

== 1973 Coup ==
Her husband was tortured and murdered in the 1973 coup. He left the morning of the coup to defend the university and was corralled with others into the stadium, which became "a makeshift prison camp". Jara sought assistance from the British embassy, which was closed. Jara identified his body in the Santiago morgue within a pile of corpses, where his wrists and neck were broken, his abdomen gory, and his body shot with 44 bullets. Before he died, he arranged for a message to be smuggled out of the stadium to his wife, telling her where he had last parked their car and saying that he loved her. He became one of the best-known victims of the coup.

Having left Chile in 1973, she changed her surname to Jara, and dedicated herself to perpetuating the memory of her husband, his works, and his values. She returned to Chile in 1984 to revive his memory, publishing her book An Unfinished Song: The Life of Victor Jara that year. In an interview, Jara said the Chilean military would not tell her the names of the officers at the stadium where Víctor died. As court cases proceeded, the military underlings outed their officers. Her lawyer added that the Chilean military has a "pact of silence" against providing information to the families of the disappeared, and that the low-level soldiers' testimony was pivotal to their officer identification efforts.

== Civil lawsuit ==
In 2013, Jara filed a civil lawsuit against a former military officer she charged as responsible for her husband's death, Pedro Barrientos, who lived in Florida for about 20 years and became an American citizen through marriage. The lawsuit was filed under the Torture Victim Protection Act and the Alien Tort Statute, a federal law that lets American courts try foreign human rights disputes. Barrientos and six others were charged in Jara's murder in December 2012 based on a conscript's corroborated testimony. Joan Jara's testimony also played a crucial role in the civil trial. The trial court dismissed the Alien Tort Statute claims, concluding that the case lacked sufficient ties to the United States, but it allowed the Torture Victims Protection Act claims to proceed to trial. Following the trial, the jury found Barrientos liable for the torture of Víctor Jara and awarded the Jaras $28 million. Joan Jara appealed the trial court's dismissal of the Alien Tort Statute claims to the U.S. Court of Appeals for the Eleventh Circuit. The Eleventh Circuit upheld the trial court's dismissal of the claims, holding that federal courts cannot exercise jurisdiction under the Alien Tort Statute when all of the defendant’s relevant conduct took place outside the United States.

Barrientos had his U.S. citizenship revoked in July 2023 and was detained by ICE authorities three months later. With Barrientos having his status in the United States reduced to that of an undocumented illegal immigrant, his planned expulsion from the country would count as a deportation rather than an extradition; Barrientos was deported back to Chile on 1 December 2023.

== Death ==
Joan Jara died in Santiago on 12 November 2023, at the age of 96. She died two weeks before Barrientos was scheduled to be deported from the United States. Following Joan's death, her body lay at Centro de Danza Espiral, the dance school she founded with her first husband, Chilean choreographer Patricio Bunster, prior to her burial on 15 November. She was buried in the General Cemetery next to Víctor Jara.
