= Celso Garrido-Lecca =

Peruvian composer (1926–2025)

Celso Garrido-Lecca Seminario (9 March 1926 – 11 August 2025) was a Peruvian composer. He was born in Lima and studied composition with Rodolfo Holzmann in Peru's National Conservatory. He concluded his studies in Chile. He was admitted into Universidad de Chile's Theatre Institute as composer and music advisor, and worked there for 10 years. Celso Garrido Lecca entered Universidad de Chile's Composition Department, and was eventually chief of that section. In 1964, he was awarded a scholarship in Tanglewood, and studied there with Aaron Copland. He returned to Peru in 1973, and taught composition at Peru's National Conservatory.

His most important works include "Antaras" for double string quartet and double bass, "Laudes I" and "Laudes II", "Elegía a Macchu Pichu", "Sonata Fantasía" for cello and piano. He was a member of the Colegio de Compositores Latinoamericanos de Música de Arte.

Garrido-Lecca died in Lima on 11 August 2025, at the age of 99.

== Awards ==
- Order of Civil Merit in the rank of Commander, Spain, 1982
- Order of Bernardo O'Higgins in the rank of Officer, Chile, 1997
- Honorary Professor at Ricardo Palma University, 2015
- Honorary Doctorate from National University of Engineering, Peru, 2015)
- Winner of the Southern Award for Human Creativity (2015)
