= Manifiesto (Víctor Jara album) =

Studio album by Víctor Jara
- Released: 1974
- Recorded: 1973
- Genres: Folk music Protest music
- Length: 36:58
- Labels: Odeon; Alerce; Warner
- Producer: Víctor Jara

Víctor Jara chronology
Tiempos que cambian (1973)	Manifiesto (1974)

Manifiesto is the ninth solo studio album from Chilean songwriter Víctor Jara. The record was released posthumously after his murder in 1973. It used a base the songs written for the album Tiempos que cambian (Times that change), that was left unfinished.

In the album, the Chilean group Inti-Illimani and the Chilean musician Patricio Castillo participate. Patricio Castillo belonged, until 1971, to Quilapayún, another famous Chilean band, which he re-entered definitively several years later. Most of the songs were composed by Víctor Jara, with the exception of «Aquí me quedo» (Here I stay), composed with Patricio Castillo.

== Versions ==
This album has several editions, with different covers, name changes and addition of songs. The original cover of Tiempos que cambian (Times that change), included a photograph of Víctor Jara in black and white, in profile, looking to the right. That image was later used in 2001, by WEA Chile, for the edition of the Antología musical (Musical anthology). For the edition of Manifiesto from 2001, made by WEA Chile, and image of Víctor Jara, with poncho and with a stone behind was used.

== Track listing ==
All music is composed by Víctor Jara, unless otherwise stated.

Manifiesto
No.	Title	Music	Length
1.	"Manifiesto"		4:29
2.	"Cuando voy al trabajo"		3:53
3.	"El Pimiento"		3:55
4.	"Vientos del pueblo"		2:37
5.	"Aquí me quedo"	Pablo Neruda, Patricio Castillo, Víctor Jara	3:01
6.	"Caicaivilú (o La serpiente luminosa)" (single A, 1972)		3:10
7.	"Doncella encantada (o Huillimalón)" (single B, 1972)		4:19
8.	"La Bala" (single A, 1972)	Popular Venezolana, Víctor Jara	5:10
9.	"Qué lindo es ser voluntario" (single B, 1972)		3:28
10.	"Marcha de los trabajadores de la construcción" (single A, 1973)		3:27
11.	"Parando los tijerales" (single B, 1973)		2:41
12.	"Arauco" (con la Orquesta de la U. de Chile; Arr.: Mariano Casanova)		2:51
13.	"Oficina abandonada" (con la Orquesta de la U. de Chile; Arr.: Mariano Casanova)		3:00
14.	"Vientos del pueblo" (version alternativa; Arr.: Sergio Ortega)		2:25
15.	"Aquí me quedo" (version alternativa; Arr.: Sergio Ortega)	Pablo Neruda, Patricio Castillo, Víctor Jara	2:49
16.	"El arado" (segunda versión, 1973)		3:26
Total length:			54:41

== Credits ==
2001 Re-edition:

- Patricio Castillo: canciones 1 a 3, 5
- Inti-Illimani: canción 4
- Carlos Esteban Fonseca: adaptation and design
- Joaquín García: mastering
- Patricio Guzmán, Antonio Larrea: photography
