= Víctor Jara =

Chilean folk singer and activist (1932–1973)

Background information
- Born: Víctor Lidio Jara Martínez; 28 September 1932; San Ignacio, Chile
- Origin: Chillán Viejo, Chile
- Died: 16 September 1973 (aged 40) Santiago, Chile
- Genres: Folk; Nueva canción; Andean music
- Occupations: Singer-songwriter; poet; theatre director; academic; social activist
- Instruments: Vocals; Spanish guitar
- Years active: 1946–1973
- Labels: EMI-Odeon; DICAP/Alerce; Warner
- Formerly of: Violeta Parra; Patricio Castillo; Quilapayún; Inti-Illimani; Patricio Manns; Ángel Parra; Isabel Parra; Sergio Ortega; Pablo Neruda; Daniel Viglietti; Atahualpa Yupanqui; Joan Baez; Phil Ochs; Dean Reed; Silvio Rodríguez; Holly Near; Cornelis Vreeswijk
- Spouse: Joan Turner (m. 1960)
- Website: fundacionvictorjara.org

Víctor Lidio Jara Martínez (Spanish pronunciation: [ˈbiɣtoɾ ˈliðjo ˈxaɾa maɾˈtines]; 28 September 1932 – 16 September 1973) was a Chilean teacher, theater director, poet, singer-songwriter, and political activist. A committed Communist, he directed a wide range of theatrical works, from locally produced plays to world classics and experimental drama by writers such as Ann Jellicoe, and became one of the leading figures of the neo-folkloric movement that established the Nueva canción chilena (New Chilean Song). That movement fueled a resurgence of politically engaged popular music during the presidency of Salvador Allende.

Jara was arrested by the Chilean military the day after the 11 September 1973 coup led by Augusto Pinochet, which overthrew Allende. Jara was beaten and tortured over several days of detention at Chile Stadium in Santiago, and was ultimately shot dead; his body, bearing 44 bullet wounds, was dumped in the street of a nearby shantytown. The contrast between the themes of his songs—love, peace, and social justice—and the brutality of his death turned Jara into a "potent symbol of struggle for human rights and justice" for the victims of the Pinochet dictatorship. His prominence as a cultural ambassador for Allende's government and an admirer of Che Guevara made him a particular target of the new regime.

The pursuit of accountability for Jara's murder has spanned decades. In June 2016, a Florida jury found former Chilean Army lieutenant Pedro Barrientos liable for his death in a civil suit. In July 2018, eight retired Chilean military officers were sentenced to prison for the murders of Jara and former prisons director Littré Quiroga. Barrientos, whose U.S. citizenship was revoked in 2023, was arrested in Deltona, Florida, that October and deported to Chile that December, where he was placed in police custody. On 26 July 2026, retired colonel Nelson Haase Mazzei—the last of the seven officers convicted in 2023 still at large—was captured in southern Chile and imprisoned to serve his sentence. The Víctor Jara Foundation, set up by his widow, the British dancer and activist Joan Jara, said in statement: “We learned that retired Colonel Nelson Haase Mazzei, who had been a fugitive from justice since 2023, was found and imprisoned. We welcome this news. “However, it is important for us to emphasize that, half a century after the murders of Víctor Jara and Littré Quiroga, it is difficult to see this as this justice.”

== Early life ==
Víctor Lidio Jara Martínez was born on 28 September 1932. His parents were tenant farmers who lived near the town of La Quiriquina, twelve kilometers from Chillán Viejo; he had four siblings, María, Georgina ("Coca"), Eduardo ("Lalo"), and Roberto. His exact place of birth is uncertain, but he was born in the Ñuble Region. At the age of five, his family moved to Lonquén, a town near Santiago, where his father, Manuel Jara, had rented a small parcel of land. His father was illiterate and wanted his children in the fields rather than in school, but his mother, who could read a little, insisted they at least learn the alphabet.

In a recorded 1970 interview in Moscow, Jara recalled: "I was born in the south of Chile, in the province of Ñuble, a very rainy province also shaken by earthquakes. My parents were tenant farmers on an estate, and it was my mother who encouraged me toward music, because she sang, and there was always a guitar in the house. Later, when I was about twelve, we moved closer to the capital for work."

Jara's mother, Amanda Martínez, was a mestiza with Mapuche ancestry from southern Chile who had taught herself guitar and piano and performed traditional folk songs at local weddings and funerals. As the relationship between his parents deteriorated—his father drank heavily and was frequently absent—his mother moved the family to Santiago, taking work as a cook to support her children's education, including Víctor's. Around this time the family also lived in the Los Nogales district, where Víctor, having left school, worked for a time in a furniture factory and as an assistant to a family friend who worked as a transporter.

His mother died when Jara was 15, dissolving the family unit; he was also romantically involved with actress Gabriela Medina for three years during this period. On the advice of a priest, he entered the seminary of the Congregation of the Most Holy Redeemer in San Bernardo to study for the priesthood. He later reflected on the decision:

I think it was a very intimate and affective affair. Looking back a little, now and with greater maturity, it was nothing more than loneliness, the disencounter with a world that you have kept solid, home and maternal affection and suddenly it disappears and everything disappears, so you have that affection next to young boys who have a relationship with a Church and well I took refuge there. Then I considered that this refuge led me to other values of encounter with another, deeper affection that perhaps came to balance that lack of interior affection, believing that I found that affection in religion, in dedicating myself to the priesthood.

— Víctor Jara

After two years, having practiced Gregorian chant and the Catholic liturgy, Jara became disillusioned with religious life and left the seminary. He subsequently completed compulsory military service as a conscript in the Chilean Army's infantry school before returning to civilian life to pursue music and theater.

== Musical and theatrical career ==
After completing his military service, Jara joined the choir of the University of Chile in Santiago, where he was convinced by a fellow chorus member to pursue theater. He enrolled in the university's theater program, earning a scholarship, and appeared in several productions with pronounced social themes, including Russian playwright Maxim Gorky's The Lower Depths. He went on to direct or assist in directing numerous plays for the university's Institute of Theatre (ITUCH) through the 1960s, working alongside figures such as Pedro de la Barra and Uruguayan director Atahualpa del Cioppo, and served on the university's theater faculty between 1964 and 1967. For his 1965 productions of Alejandro Sieveking's La remolienda and Ann Jellicoe's The Knack, he received the Laurel de Oro and the Press Circle's Critics' Prize.

In 1957, Jara met Violeta Parra, who had steered Chilean folk music toward a modern song tradition rooted in older forms and who had founded community centers, or peñas, devoted to folk music. Jara absorbed these influences and began performing with the folk ensemble Cuncumén, working as its guitarist and vocalist from 1957 to 1963. He was deeply influenced by the folk traditions of Chile and the wider Andean region, and by figures such as Parra, Atahualpa Yupanqui, and poet Pablo Neruda. During the 1960s he specialized increasingly in folk music, performing at Santiago's La Peña de los Parra, run by Ángel Parra, and became closely associated with the broader Nueva canción movement of Latin American folk music.

In 1966, Jara released his self-titled debut solo album on the small Demon label, later reissued under the titles Canto a lo humano and Sus mejores canciones and again on CD by Warner Music Chile in 2001, with five bonus tracks recorded with Cuncumén. The album drew on Latin American folk repertoire, including "La flor que anda de mano en mano" and "Ojitos verdes", as well as Chilean, Argentine, and Bolivian traditional songs. Its rights were held by label owner Camilo Fernández until 2001, when he transferred them to Jara's widow.

Jara released a second, self-titled album in 1967 (later reissued as Desde Lonquén hasta siempre), and, the same year, his first collaborative record, Canciones folklóricas de América, with Quilapayún, for whom he also served as artistic director between 1966 and 1969. In 1969, his song "Plegaria a un labrador" won first prize at the inaugural Nueva Canción Chilena festival, and he traveled to Helsinki to perform at an international protest against the Vietnam War. In 1970, Jara stepped back from theater to concentrate on music, though he continued to direct occasional productions, including a 1972 staging of Antigone and a ballet and musical tribute to Pablo Neruda.

== Political activism ==
Early in his recording career, Jara showed a knack for antagonizing conservative Chileans; his comic song "La beata," about a churchgoing woman infatuated with her confessor, was banned from radio and pulled from shops, which only enhanced his standing among young, progressive audiences. Of greater concern to the Chilean right was his growing identification with the socialist movement led by Salvador Allende. After visiting Cuba and the Soviet Union in the early 1960s, Jara joined the Communist Party of Chile, and his songs increasingly reflected the poverty he had witnessed firsthand.

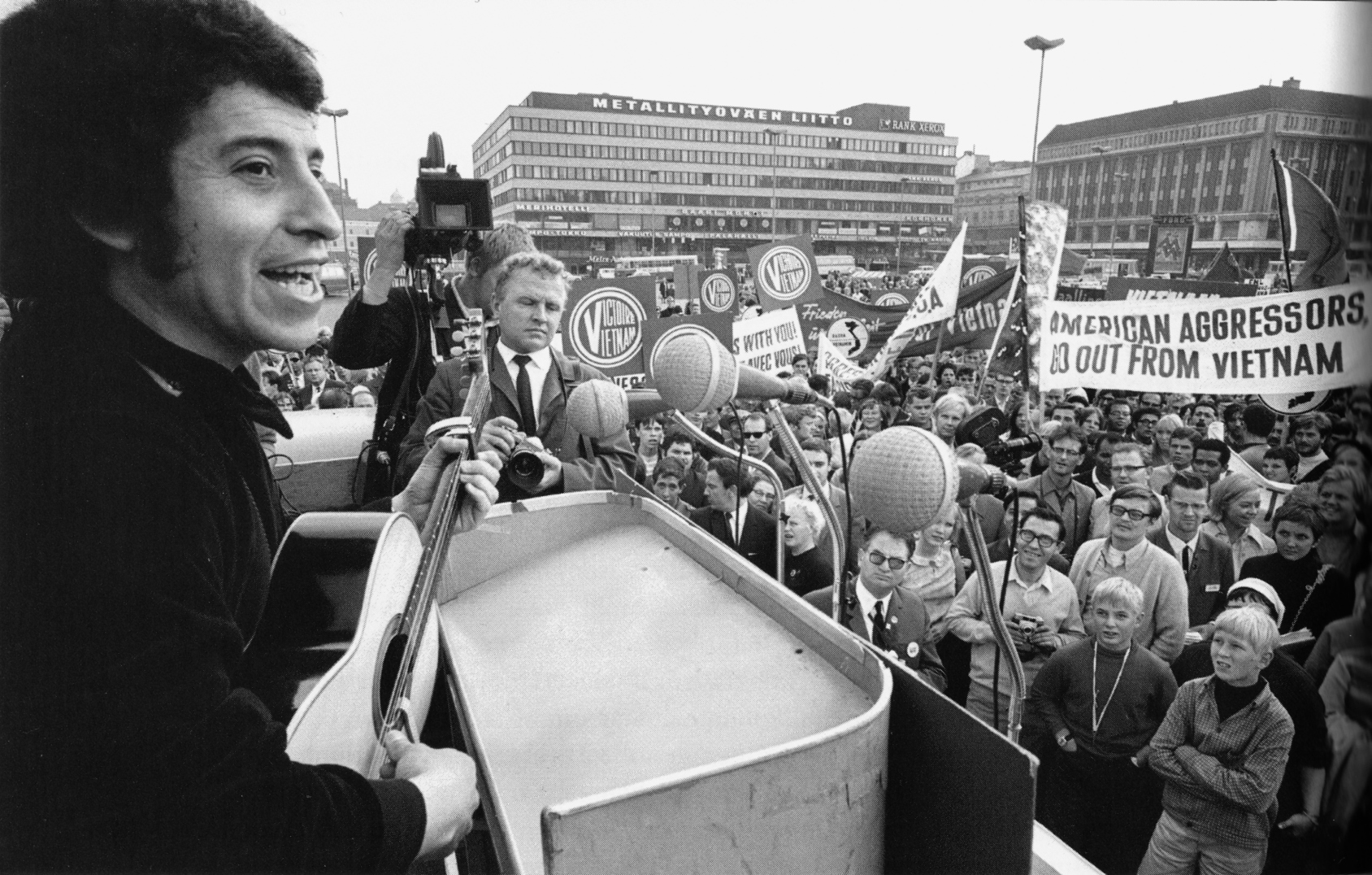
In 1969, Jara appeared in Helsinki protests against the Vietnam War

His songs and reputation spread beyond Chile and were taken up by American folk artists. He turned toward direct political confrontation with his 1969 song "Preguntas por Puerto Montt," which condemned government minister Edmundo Pérez Zujovic for ordering police to attack squatters in Puerto Montt and its surrounding settlements, an episode in which eleven people were killed, including a three-month-old infant. The song accused Pérez Zujovic directly, warning him that "not all the rain of the south" would wash his hands clean. The political situation deteriorated further after Pérez Zujovic's 1971 assassination, and Jara himself was beaten by right-wing assailants on at least one occasion.

In 1970, Jara actively supported Allende's Popular Unity candidacy, volunteering for the campaign and performing free concerts. He composed "Venceremos" ("We Will Triumph"), the movement's anthem, and after Allende's election continued to support the new government's efforts to reshape Chilean cultural life, being named a cultural ambassador.

Jara and his wife, Joan Jara, organized cultural events supporting Allende's government. He set several of Pablo Neruda's poems to music and performed at a ceremony honoring the poet after he won the Nobel Prize in Literature in 1971. He continued to teach at the Technical University of the State, where, with Isabel Parra and Inti-Illimani, he joined the university's communications department. His growing fame as both a musician and a Communist earned him a concert in Moscow, where Soviet media claimed—inaccurately—that surgery he had undergone there had improved his voice. He also worked as a composer for Televisión Nacional de Chile between 1972 and 1973 and gathered testimony from residents of the Herminda de la Victoria settlement for his concept album La Población. His final public performance is generally dated to a television appearance on Panamericana Televisión in Lima, Peru, on 17 July 1973.

On 11 September 1973, the Chilean military, with the support of the United States, overthrew the Allende government, resulting in Allende's suicide and the installation of Augusto Pinochet as dictator. Jara was on his way to work at the Technical University when the coup began. He spent that night at the university with other teachers and students, singing to keep up their spirits.

== Torture and murder ==
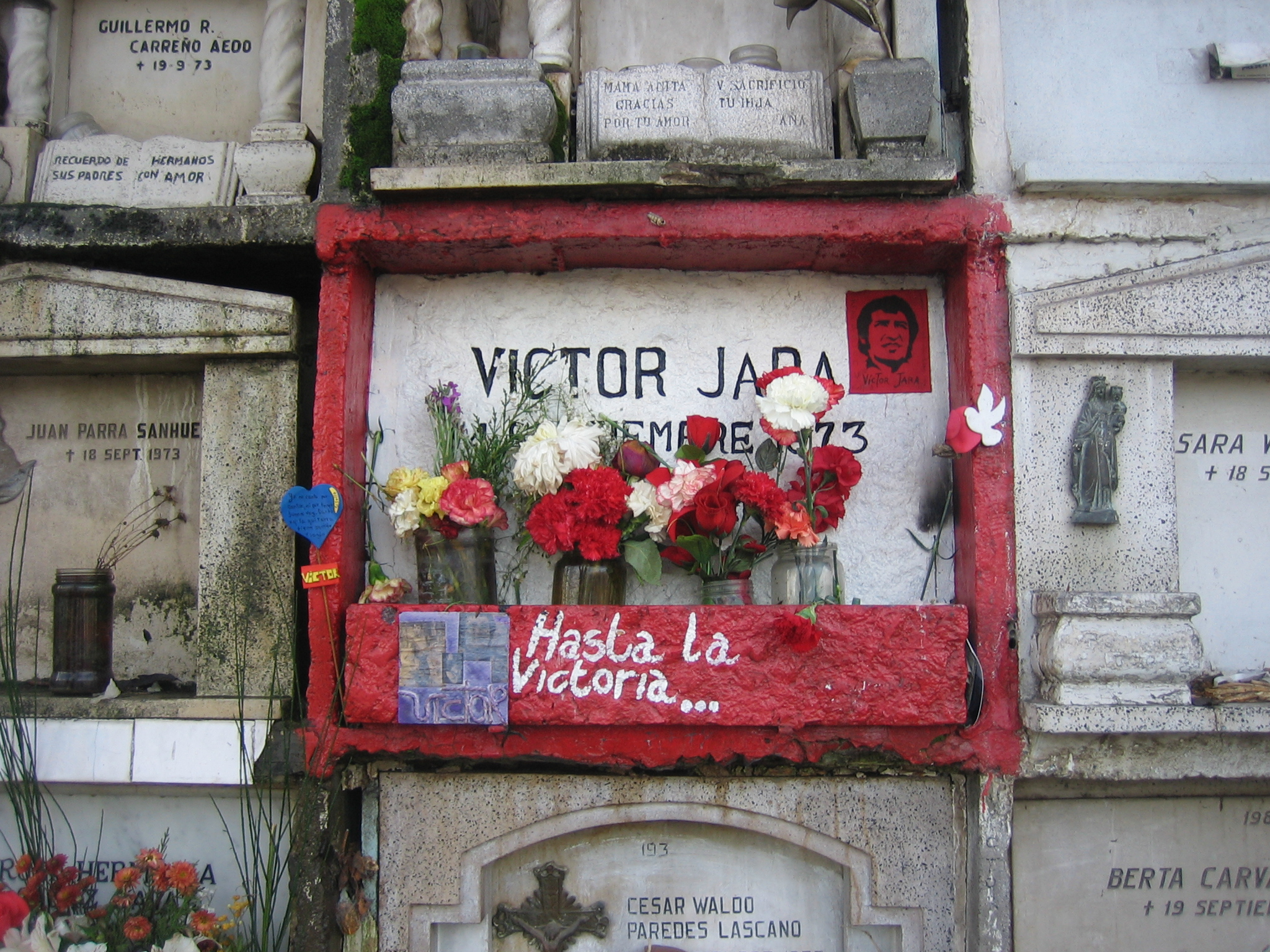
Víctor Jara's grave in the General Cemetery of Santiago. The note reads: "Until victory..."

After the coup, Pinochet's forces rounded up people believed to be linked to leftist organizations, including Allende's Popular Unity coalition. On 12 September 1973, Jara was taken prisoner along with hundreds of other professors, students, and staff at the Technical University and transferred to Estadio Chile, which had been converted into a makeshift detention center. An army intelligence officer recognized him as he was brought in and separated him from the other prisoners for interrogation. Over the following days he was beaten and tortured in the stadium's locker rooms; witnesses reported that his ribs were broken by kicks and his hands fractured with rifle butts, and that his captors mockingly demanded he play the guitar for them. He was killed with a gunshot to the head on 16 September 1973, and his body was subsequently riddled with more than 40 additional bullets. According to the BBC:

There are many conflicting accounts of Jara's last days but the 2019 Netflix documentary Massacre at the Stadium pieces together a convincing narrative. As a famous musician and prominent supporter of Allende, Jara was swiftly recognised on his way into the stadium. An army officer threw a lit cigarette on the ground, made Jara crawl for it, then stamped on his wrists. Jara was first separated from the other detainees, then beaten and tortured in the bowels of the stadium. At one point, he defiantly sang "Venceremos (We Will Win)", Allende's 1970 election anthem, through split lips. On the morning of the 16th, according to a fellow detainee, Jara asked for a pen and notebook and scribbled the lyrics to "Estadio Chile", which were later smuggled out of the stadium: "How hard it is to sing when I must sing of horror. / Horror which I am living, horror which I am dying." Two hours later, he was shot dead, then his body was riddled with machine-gun bullets and dumped in the street. He was 40.

His body was displayed at the stadium's entrance for other prisoners to see before being discarded outside, alongside the bodies of Littré Quiroga, then director of Chile's prison service, and Eduardo "Coco" Paredes, director of the Investigations Police (PDI). Civil servants found his body near the Metropolitan Cemetery, on the northern edge of what is now Víctor Jara Park, and brought it to a morgue, where one of them recognized him and contacted his wife, Joan. She identified and claimed the body, giving him a hurried, clandestine burial in the General Cemetery before fleeing into exile; she later recalled that the Chilean newspaper La Segunda had reported his death the next day as though he had died peacefully and been buried privately.

== Legal proceedings ==
On 16 May 2008, retired colonel Mario Manríquez Bravo, chief of security at Chile Stadium at the time of the coup, became the first person convicted in connection with Jara's death. Presiding judge Juan Eduardo Fuentes initially closed the case, but reopened it in June 2008 after Jara's family appealed and submitted forty pieces of new evidence.

On 28 May 2009, former army conscript José Adolfo Paredes Márquez, then 18 at the time of the killing, was formally charged with Jara's murder; he confessed to taking part and stated that a superior officer had already shot Jara in the head, playing a form of Russian roulette with him, before ordering conscripts to fire further shots into his body to finish the killing. A judge subsequently ordered Jara's body exhumed for further examination, a process carried out with the assistance of Spanish forensic anthropologist Francisco Etxeberria. In November 2009, the Víctor Jara Foundation released the findings, later ratified by the Institute of Legal Medicine and Austria's Innsbruck genetics institute: Jara had died of multiple gunshot wounds causing hemorrhagic shock, and had suffered more than thirty additional bone injuries from blunt trauma and further gunfire while detained.

On 28 December 2012, a Chilean judge ordered the arrest of eight former army officers implicated in the killing, including an international warrant for Pedro Barrientos Núñez, accused of personally shooting Jara in the head, who had resided in the United States since 1990. The indictment named Barrientos and Hugo Sánchez Marmonti as the principal perpetrators, and Roberto Souper Onfray, Raúl Jofré González, Edwin Dimter Bianchi, Nelson Haase Mazzei, and Luis Bethke Wulf as accomplices. Fellow detainees also implicated a further officer, Edwin Dimter Bianchi—known to prisoners as "El Príncipe"—as one of those responsible for the abuse Jara suffered in custody.

On 4 September 2013, Chadbourne & Parke attorneys Mark D. Beckett and Christian Urrutia, assisted by the Center for Justice and Accountability, filed suit against Barrientos, then living in Florida, on behalf of Jara's widow and children, alleging arbitrary detention, torture, extrajudicial killing, and crimes against humanity under the Alien Tort Statute and the Torture Victim Protection Act, both as a direct perpetrator and as a commanding officer. The complaint detailed the university's occupation by troops of the Arica Regiment from La Serena, Jara's detention and separation by intelligence captain Fernando Polanco Gallardo, and his subsequent custody under Barrientos and soldiers under his command in the stadium's locker room, as part of a broader, systematic campaign of abuse against civilian detainees between 11 and 15 September 1973. On 15 April 2015, a U.S. judge ordered Barrientos to stand trial in Florida. On 27 June 2016, a jury found him liable for Jara's killing and awarded his family $28 million in damages.

In July 2015, 42 years after the killing, several former Chilean military officers were formally charged with Jara's murder in the domestic criminal case. On 3 July 2018, a Chilean court sentenced eight retired military officers—Hugo Sánchez, Raúl Jofré, Edwin Dimter, Nelson Haase, Ernesto Bethke, Juan Jara, Hernán Chacón, and Patricio Vásquez—to 15 years and a day in prison as perpetrators of the murders of Jara and Littré Quiroga, plus an additional three years each for kidnapping; a ninth officer, Rolando Melo, received five years as an accessory after the fact. In November 2018, a Chilean court ordered Barrientos's extradition from the United States.

On 28 August 2023, the Chilean Supreme Court ratified the convictions of the seven officers on final appeal, confirming prison terms ranging from eight to 25 years for men then aged between 73 and 85. Retired army brigadier Hernán Chacón Soto died by suicide the following day, before he could be arrested. Two other convicted officers, Raúl Jofré González and Nelson Haase Mazzei, evaded arrest and became fugitives. Barrientos was arrested during a traffic stop in Deltona, Florida, on 5 October 2023, after his U.S. citizenship had been revoked that July for concealing details of his military service on immigration applications; he was deported to Chile on 1 December 2023 and placed in preventive detention at the Peñalolén Military Police Battalion, facing charges over both the Jara and Quiroga killings. Jara's widow, Joan, who had testified as a key witness in the 2016 civil trial, died on 12 November 2023, shortly before Barrientos's deportation.

Of the seven officers convicted in 2023, Jofré González remained a fugitive until his own capture, while Haase Mazzei, then 80 years old, was located on a rural property in the commune of Puyehue, in the Los Lagos Region, and arrested on 25–26 July 2026, ending nearly three years as a fugitive. A Santiago Court of Appeals judge, Paola Plaza, ordered his immediate imprisonment to serve a sentence of 25 years and two days for the kidnapping and murder of Jara and Quiroga, making him the last of the convicted officers to begin serving his term. In a statement, Jara's daughter Amanda welcomed the arrest but said it was "difficult to consider this justice" given the decades that had passed.

== Burial and reburial ==
Once forensic studies had concluded, Jara's remains were honored at the Víctor Jara Foundation from 3 to 5 December 2009 before being reinterred in the General Cemetery of Santiago; the funeral procession drew more than 12,000 people, a stark contrast with his clandestine burial in 1973. The foundation's then-director, Gloria Koenig, described the events as a demand for "truth and justice" for Jara and for all of Chile's victims of forced disappearance and political execution. On 19 January 2020, his grave was vandalized in an act suspected to have been carried out by right-wing extremists. Christian Galaz, executive director of the Víctor Jara Foundation, stated that he had spoken during the day with the singer-songwriter's widow, who expressed: " Víctor is not a tomb, Víctor lives in the soul of the people and will continue to give them strength for these struggles in these complex but hopeful times."

== Theater work ==
- 1959. Parecido à la Felicidad (Some Kind of Happiness), Alejandro Sieveking
- 1960. La Viuda de Apablaza (The Widow of Apablaza), Germán Luco Cruchaga (assistant director to Pedro de la Barra, founder of ITUCH)
- 1960. The Mandrake, Niccolò Machiavelli
- 1961. La Madre de los Conejos (Mother Rabbit), Alejandro Sieveking (assistant director to Agustín Siré)
- 1962. Ánimas de Día Claro (Daylight Spirits), Alejandro Sieveking
- 1963. The Caucasian Chalk Circle, Bertolt Brecht (assistant director to Atahualpa del Cioppo)
- 1963. Los Invasores (The Intruders), Egon Wolff
- 1963. Dúo (Duet), Raúl Ruiz
- 1963. Parecido à la Felicidad, Alejandro Sieveking (version for Chilean television)
- 1965. La Remolienda, Alejandro Sieveking
- 1965. The Knack, Ann Jellicoe
- 1966. Marat/Sade, Peter Weiss (assistant director to William Oliver)
- 1966. La Casa Vieja (The Old House), Abelardo Estorino
- 1967. La Remolienda, Alejandro Sieveking
- 1967. La Viuda de Apablaza, Germán Luco Cruchaga (director)
- 1968. Entertaining Mr Sloane, Joe Orton
- 1969. Viet Rock, Megan Terry
- 1969. Antigone, Sophocles
- 1972. Directed a ballet and musical homage to Pablo Neruda, which coincided with Neruda's return to Chile after being awarded the Nobel Prize for Literature.

== Filmography ==
Year	Title	Role	Notes
1960	Un viaje a Santiago	Actor	Fiction feature film
1965	Esta tierra nuestra	Composer	Documentary short

== Discography ==
=== Studio albums ===
- Víctor Jara (Geografía) (1966)
- Víctor Jara (1967)
- Canciones folklóricas de América (with Quilapayún) (1967)
- Pongo en tus manos abiertas (1969)
- Canto libre (1970)
- El derecho de vivir en paz (1971)
- La Población (1972)
- Canto por travesura (1973)
- Tiempos que cambian (unfinished) (Estimated release: 1974)
- Manifiesto (1974; reissued in 2001)

=== Live albums ===
- Víctor Jara en Vivo (1974)
- El Recital (1983)
- Víctor Jara en México (1996)
- Habla y canta (1996; reissued in 2001)
- En Vivo en el Aula Magna de la Universidad de Valparaíso (2003)

=== Compilations ===
- Te recuerdo, Amanda (1974)
- Presente (1975)
- Vientos Del Pueblo (1976)
- Canto Libre (1977)
- An unfinished song (1984)
- Todo Víctor Jara (1992)
- 20 Años Después (1992)
- The Rough Guide to the Music of the Andes (1996)
- Víctor Jara presente, colección "Haciendo Historia" (1997)
- Te Recuerdo, Víctor (2000)
- Antología Musical (2001)
- 1959–1969 – Víctor Jara (2001)
- Latin Essential: Victor Jara (2003)
- Colección Víctor Jara (2004)
- Víctor Jara. Serie de Oro. Grandes Exitos (2005)

=== Tribute albums ===
- A Víctor Jara by Raimon (1974)
- Het Recht om in Vrede te Leven by Cornelis Vreeswijk (1978)
- Cornelis sjunger Victor Jara: Rätten till ett eget liv by Cornelis Vreeswijk (1979)
- Konzert für Víctor Jara by various artists (1998)
- Inti-illimani interpreta a Víctor Jara by Inti-Illimani (1999)
- Quilapayún Canta a Violeta Parra, Víctor Jara y Grandes Maestros Populares by Quilapayún (2000)
- Conosci Victor Jara? by Daniele Sepe (2000)
- Tributo Rock a Víctor Jara by various artists (2001)
- Tributo a Víctor Jara by various artists (2004)
- Lonquen: Tributo a Víctor Jara by Francesca Ancarola (2005)
- Even in Exile by James Dean Bradfield (2020)

== Legacy ==
=== Cultural references and tributes in music ===
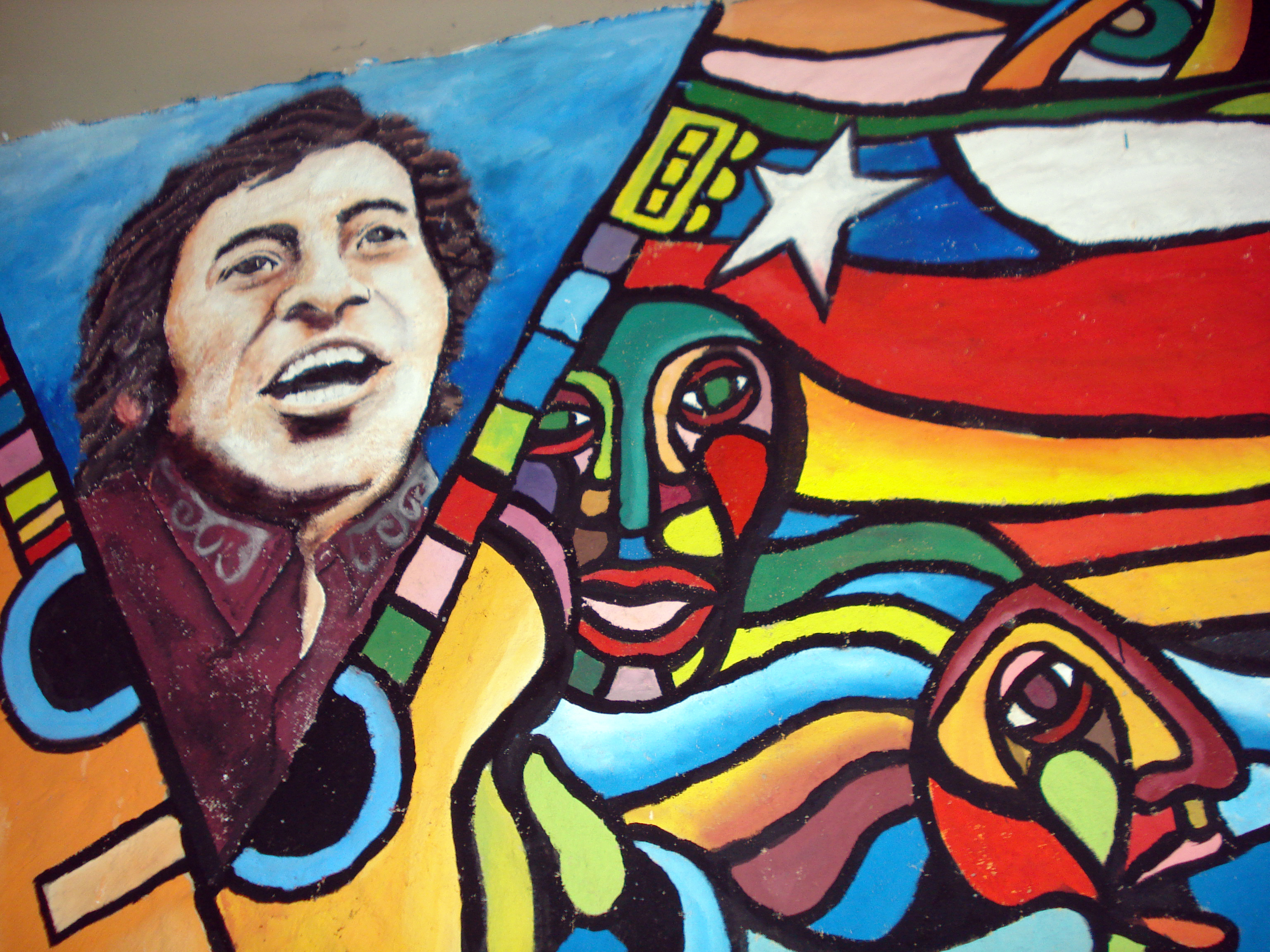
Mural of Víctor Jara painted in 2009

Jara's murder and body of work have inspired tributes from musicians around the world. In Chile, poet and singer Ángel Parra wrote an open, posthumous letter to Jara while in exile in Paris in December 1987, addressing the political violence of the coup directly. Internationally, the 1975 anthology For Neruda, for Chile contains a section titled "The Chilean Singer," with poems dedicated to him. The Swedish band Hoola Bandoola Band released the song "Victor Jara" in 1975, portraying him as a fearless voice for the oppressed, and Norwegian singer Lillebjørn Nilsen released a song of the same name on his 1975 album Byen med det store hjertet. Arlo Guthrie included a song titled "Victor Jara" on his 1976 album Amigo. In 1977, Chilean composer Leon Schidlowsky wrote the Misa Sine Nomine in Jara's memory. The Clash's "Washington Bullets," from Sandinista! (1980), references his death directly, and U2's "One Tree Hill" (1987) invokes his memory in its lyrics. Scottish band Simple Minds dedicated their 1989 song "Street Fighting Years" to him.

Later tributes include "Victor Jara's Hands," the opening track on Calexico's 2008 album Carried to Dust; English folk musician Reg Meuross's song "Victor Jara," from his 2010 album All This Longing; and the title track of Rory McLeod's Angry Love. In 2020, James Dean Bradfield of Manic Street Preachers released Even in Exile, a concept album on Jara's life and death with lyrics by poet Patrick Jones, accompanied by a companion podcast. American band Fleet Foxes included a track called "Jara" on their 2020 album Shore; songwriter Robin Pecknold has described it as a tribute to politically active friends, closing with the line "Now you're off to Victor on his ladder to the sky." German metalcore band Heaven Shall Burn's 2004 album Antigone likewise includes a tribute song, "The Weapon They Fear."

Jara's 1971 song "El derecho de vivir en paz" ("The Right to Live in Peace") saw renewed popularity during Chile's 2019 social uprising, becoming one of the most streamed protest anthems in the country and a rallying cry against state violence nearly 50 years after his death.

=== Documentaries and film ===
The following are films or documentaries about and/or featuring Víctor Jara:

- 1973: El Tigre Saltó y Mató, Pero Morirá...Morirá.... Director: Santiago Álvarez – Cuba
- 1974: Compañero: Víctor Jara of Chile. Directors: Stanley Foreman/Martin Smith (Documentary) – UK
- 1976: Il Pleut sur Santiago. Director: Helvio Soto – France/Bulgaria
- 1978: Ein April hat 30 Tage. Director: Gunther Scholz – East Germany
- 1978: El Cantor. Director: Dean Reed – East Germany
- 1999: El Derecho de Vivir en Paz. Director: Carmen Luz Parot – Chile
- 2001: Freedom Highway: Songs That Shaped a Century. Director: Philip King – Ireland
- 2005: La Tierra de las 1000 Músicas [Episode 6: La Protesta]. Directors: Luis Miguel González Cruz, Joaquín Luqui – Spain
- 2007: La funa de Víctor Jara. Directors: Nélida D. Ruiz de los Paños and Cristián Villablanca – Spain/Chile
- 2010: Phil Ochs: There but for Fortune Director: Kenneth Bowser
- 2015: The Resurrection of Víctor Jara Director: John Travers - United States
- 2019: Masacre en el estadio. Netflix
- An Unfinished Song, a long-planned adaptation of Joan Jara's memoir, was developed in the late 1990s by Emma Thompson, who intended to star alongside Antonio Banderas as Jara; the project has not been completed.
- 2026: Wild Horse Nine. Fictional story based on real events that includes a folk singer in Easter Island, identified as Jara.

=== Monuments, namesakes, and other honors ===
Following the coup, Jara's story reached the astronomical world when, on 22 September 1973, Soviet astronomer Nikolai Stepanovich Chernykh named a newly discovered main-belt asteroid "2644 Victor Jara" in his honor. In Chile, the old Estadio Chile, where he was killed, was formally renamed Víctor Jara Stadium in September 2003, on the 30th anniversary of the coup. Sculptor Lautaro Díaz Silva created a four-meter bronze guitar sculpture, Víctor Jara regresa a la UTE ("Víctor Jara returns to the UTE"), which he donated to the University of Santiago in 2003. On 7 September 2021, the municipality of Estación Central renamed a section of Avenida Ecuador near the former Technical University campus as Avenida Víctor Jara, commemorating the site of his arrest.

The Víctor Jara Foundation (Fundación Víctor Jara), a nonprofit organization founded in 1994 and led for many years by Joan Jara, administers his musical estate and promotes his work. Joan Jara also publicized the poem, later known as "Estadio Chile," that Jara wrote in the stadium shortly before his death and smuggled out inside a friend's shoe. From 2002 until 2013, the foundation operated the Galpón Víctor Jara, a cultural center in Santiago's Barrio Brasil, which closed after a Chilean Supreme Court order.

Outside Chile, a Danish fishing schooner built in 1917 was renamed in Jara's honor in 2007; it continues to sail at cultural and social events and is otherwise berthed at a maritime museum in Lübeck, Germany. In Vecindario, on the Spanish island of Gran Canaria, the Víctor Jara Theatre was inaugurated around 1989 in his memory. A bronze plaque honoring Jara, created by sculptor Lautaro Díaz Silva in 1998 for Barcelona's Plaça Karl Marx, was reinaugurated on a stone monolith in 2002 and, following a 2025–2026 relocation initiative led by neighborhood associations, moved to the nearby Parc Josep Maria Serra Martí, where it was rededicated on 12 September 2026 in the presence of Jara's daughter Amanda.

In 2013, listing Jara among "15 Rock & Roll Rebels," Rolling Stone named him the only Latin American artist to make the list.

In 2013, a theater company in Concepción, La Otra Zapatilla, premiered Víctor, un canto para alcanzar las estrellas, a play about his life that went on to win a Ceres award for best play and was performed at the Santiago a Mil festival.

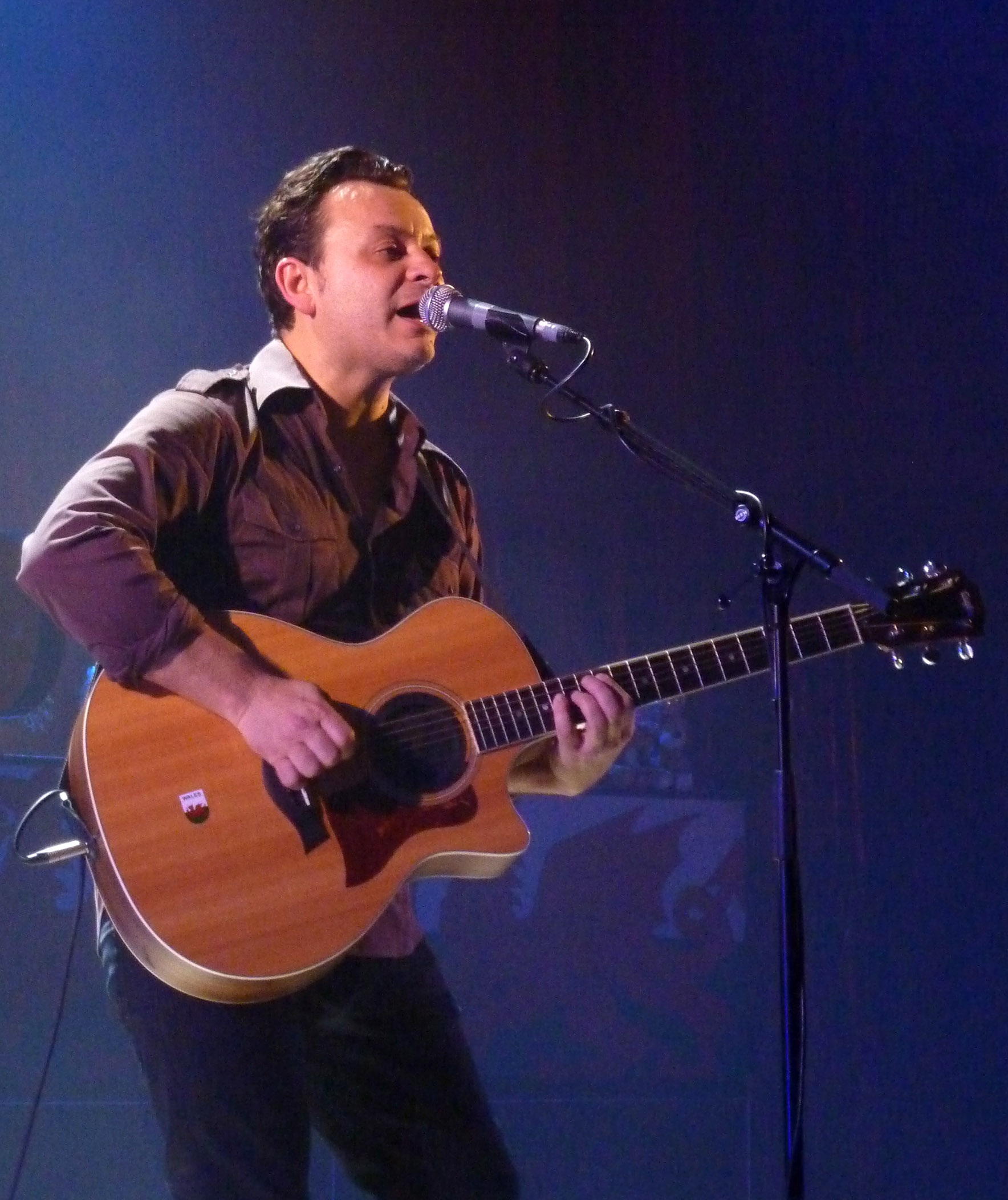
James Dean Bradfield produced a podcast and an album, Even in Exile, on the life of Jara

On 8 November 2021, the video game Dead by Daylight introduced a playable character, Carmina Mora, a Chilean painter whose backstory alludes to Jara.

On 3 September 2026, a fictionalized version of Jara (played by actor Aron Hernández) appeared in Martin McDonagh's black comedy-thriller film Wild Horse Nine. Set shortly before the 1973 coup, the film depicts a scene where characters visit a bar on Easter Island to watch Jara perform, serving as a bittersweet homage to the loss of artistic life following the dictatorship. At the request of Jara's family, the character performs a song by Violeta Parra instead of his own composition.

== See also ==
- Nueva Canción Chilena
- Estadio Victor Jara
- 2644 Victor Jara
- Brigada Victor Jara
- Galpón Víctor Jara

== Bibliography ==
- Jara, Joan (1983). Victor: An Unfinished Song. Jonathan Cape, London. ISBN 0-224-01880-9
- Lowenfels, Walter (1975). For Neruda, for Chile: An International Anthology. Boston: Beacon Press. ISBN 978-0-8070-6383-5.
- Kósichev, Leonard. (1990). La guitarra y el poncho de Víctor Jara. Progress Publishers, Moscow.
- Amorós, Mario (2023). La vida es eterna. Biografía de Víctor Jara. Ediciones B, Madrid.
- Sepúlveda Corradini, Gabriel (2001). Víctor Jara: hombre de teatro. Sudamericana, Santiago.
