= Patricio Castillo (folk musician) =

- Born: 1946 (age 79–80); Cautín, Chile
- Genres: Folk, Andean music, Latin music, Chilean music
- Occupation: Musician
- Instruments: Guitar, Charango, Flute
- Years active: 1965–present
- Labels: EMI-Odeon, Picap, Warner Music
- Website: http://www.patriciocastillo.com/

Patricio Castillo (born 1946, Cautín, Chile) is a Chilean musician and former member of the Chilean folk music group Quilapayún. He is well known for his collaborations with the Chilean singer-songwriter, Víctor Jara.

== Biography ==
Castillo was born into a musical family; both of his parents were classical musicians and pedagogues, his father a violinist and his mother a pianist. Early in his life Castillo defined his aspirations to pursue a career in music as his parents had done. He was a childhood friend of Horacio Salinas who also originated from his hometown; who would also go on to join the neo-folkloric New Chilean Song movement that aimed to renovate Chilean folklore.

Castillo was educated in Santiago and in 1963 he began to study classical guitar at the National Conservatorium of Music which would later become part of the University of Chile. In 1965 Castillo enters the Faculty of Philosophy and Education of the University of Chile to study humanities with a focus on philosophy. Simultaneously Castillo pursued further studies in the field of classical music and the history of music and art at the Conservatorium of the University.

Castillo made numerous recordings with some of the leading folklorists of the New Chilean Song movement which included some of the most influential musicians in Latin America, including Víctor Jara, Los Parras and Los Jaivas. Early on in his career Castillo began to collaborate musically with Victor Jara on many of his albums and they jointly composed a song that would go on to become one of Victor Jara's most famous songs Plegaria a un Labrador (Prayer to a labourer). Castillo's musical collaboration with Victor Jara ceased after the U.S.-backed 11 September, 1973 Chilean coup ended the government of Salvador Allende along with all the cultural projects that were initiated in support of his democratically elected socialist government.

== Discography ==
=== Quilapayún ===
- Quilapayún (1966)
- Canciones folklóricas de América (1967) (Quilapayún & Víctor Jara)
- X Vietnam (1968)
- Quilapayún Tres (1968)
- Basta (1969)
- Quilapayún Cuatro (1970)
- Cantata Santa María de Iquique (1970) (Quilapayún & Héctor Duvauchelle)
- Al horizonte (1999)
- A Palau (2003)
- Canto Por El Cambio (2004)

=== With Víctor Jara ===
- Víctor Jara, Canto a lo humano (1966)
- Víctor Jara (1967)
- Pongo en tus manos abiertas (1969)
- Canto libre (1970)
- El derecho de vivir en paz (1971)
- Manifiesto (1974)

=== With Los Jaivas ===
- Todos juntos (1972)
- Alturas de Macchu Picchu (1981)
- Aconcagua (1982)
- Obras de Violeta Parra (1984)

=== Solo ===
- Provinces (1977)
- La primavera muerta en el tejado (1977)
