= 2016 Kagoshima gubernatorial election =

- 10 July 2016
- Turnout: 56.77 ▲12.92
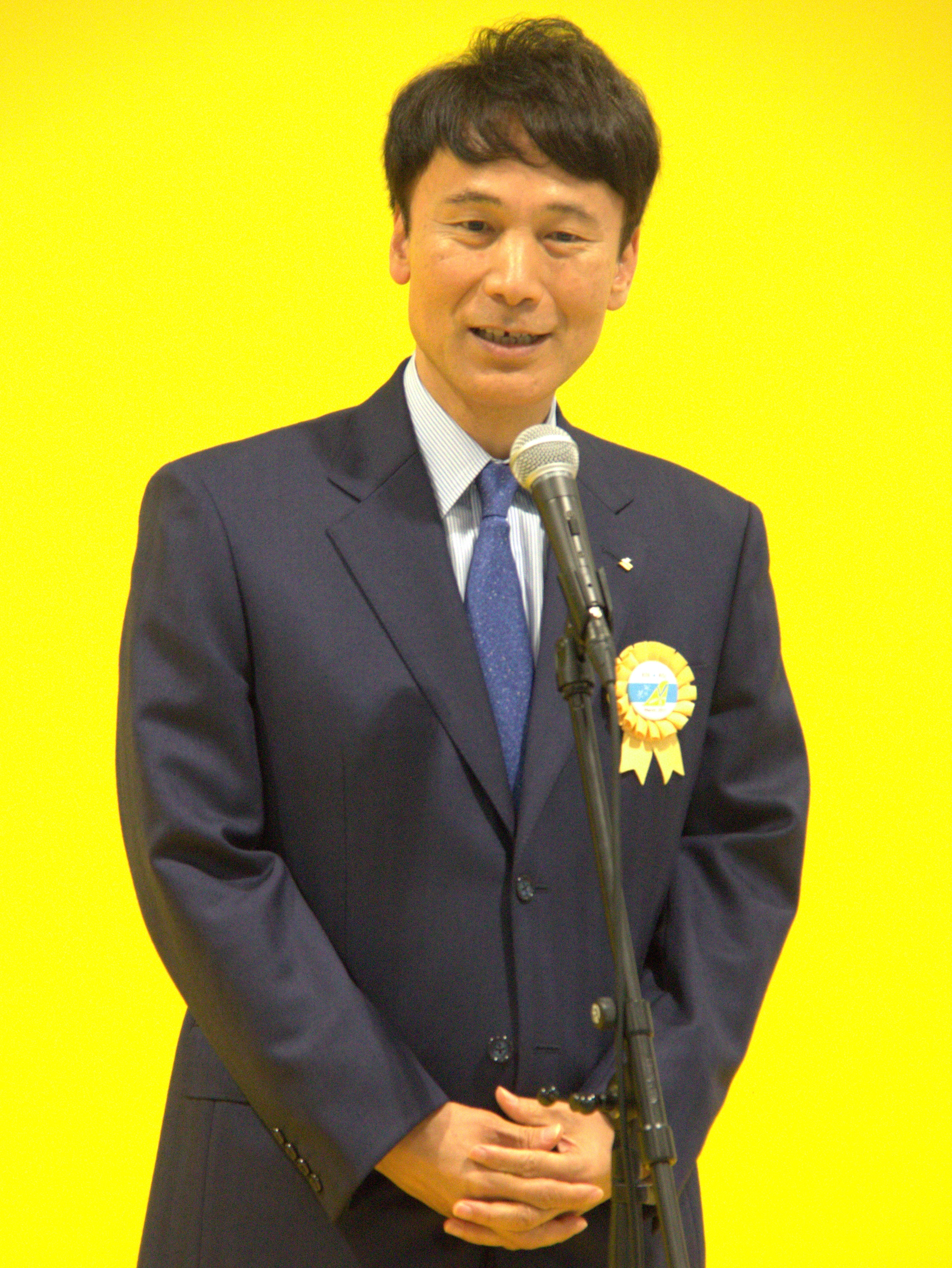
| Candidate | Satoshi Mitazono | Yuichiro Ito |
| Party | Independent | Independent |
| Popular vote | 426,471 | 342,239 |
| Percentage | 55.48% | 44.52% |
| Supported by | DP, SDP | LDP, Komeito |
Governor before election
Yuichiro Ito
Independent
Elected Governor
Satoshi Mitazono
Independent

The 2016 Kagoshima gubernatorial election was held on 10 July 2016 and contested by the three-term incumbent Yuichiro Ito and political journalist Satoshi Mitazono. Ito was denied a fourth term in office, as Mitazono received 55% of the vote following a campaign based primarily on change as well as opposition to the prefecture's operating nuclear power plant. The election was held on the same day as the national House of Councillors election, which helped increase voter turnout to 58.6%, compared to 43.8% at the previous election in 2012.

== Background ==
Yuichiro Ito was first elected to the office of governor in a four-candidate race in July 2004, in which the 79-year-old incumbent Tatsuro Suga did not seek re-election. He was re-elected with a large majority in the 2008 and 2012 elections.

In 2013 Ito suffered a loss of popularity when he formulated a plan to send prefectural employees for training in Shanghai using public funds, in order to maintain the viability of China Eastern Airlines' failing Kagoshima-Shanghai route. This and concerns about other local issues, including construction of a large-scale sports arena and an industrial waste disposal plant, led to the launch of an official petition in October 2013 seeking Ito's recall. In response the prefecture set up a website explaining the government policy behind decisions made on each of the issues, and the petition ultimately did not receive the required number of signatures during the two-month collection period.

In November 2014 Ito approved the restart of the Sendai Nuclear Power Plant, which was shut down following the March 2011 Fukushima Daiichi nuclear disaster. This paved the way for the restart of two of the plant's reactors in August and October 2015, the first in the country to be restarted and the only reactors in operation at the time of the election. Local consent to the restart was also given by the Kagoshima Prefectural Assembly and the Satsumasendai city assembly, where the plant is located. The decision was met with protests locally and on a national level, with disruption caused at the prefectural assembly at the time of the vote and former Prime Minister Naoto Kan rallying protestors outside the plant at the time the first reactor was restarted. A series of earthquakes in neighbouring Kumamoto Prefecture in April 2016 caused further concerns about the plant's safety.

== Election campaign ==
Ito announced his intention to seek a fourth term during a prefectural assembly session on 2 December 2015, stressing his intention not to change his position on the planned construction of a third reactor at the Sendai plant. On 31 December 2015, Satoshi Mitazono, a veteran political journalist with TV Asahi, announced his intention to run in the election as an independent candidate. During a press conference in front of the prefectural government's building, he stated his hope that Ito would "pass the baton" after 12 years in office. Mitazono officially declared his candidacy in February 2016, stating at this time that, as the power plant had been restarted, the safety and peace of minds of residents was necessary, and that he would "aim for a society that did not rely upon nuclear power". It was reported that anti-nuclear protest groups were preparing to field an "anti-Ito" candidate in the election, but the groups eventually supported Mitazono when his position on nuclear power became clearer.

Ito and Mitazono were the only two candidates to contest the election, and both ran as officially independent candidates. Ito received official endorsements from the conservative Liberal Democratic and Komeito parties. Mitazono was considered a "conservative independent" candidate, and received official endorsement from the Democratic and Social Democratic parties, as well as support from anti-nuclear groups and "anti-Ito" conservative local assembly members and former prefectural assembly members.

The main theme of the election campaign was whether to allow Ito's 12-year governorship to continue or to adopt Mitazono's policy of change. The Sankei Shimbun reported that, when campaigning within Kagoshima city and other larger cities, Mitazono stressed his anti-nuclear position and the need for the prefecture to adopt natural and renewable energy sources. On the other hand, when campaigning in regions economically harmed by the nuclear plant shutdown, Mitazono did not speak on the issue of nuclear power at all. It was further reported that, at a private rally in Satsumasendai four days prior to the election, when Mitazono spoke of "converting Kagoshima to a natural energy prefecture" he received little reaction from the crowd. But his repeated claim that "if the governor changes Kagoshima will change" received repeated rounds of applause.

Ito's campaign rarely addressed the issue of nuclear power, instead stressing his focus on supporting the forestry, agricultural, fishery and tourism industries, with the message that "continuity is power". At a meeting in Kagoshima city a few days prior to the election, Ito noted that due to the suspension of nuclear power, 3.6 trillion yen had flowed overseas for the purchase of fossil fuels. Liberal Democratic Party Secretary-General Sadakazu Tanigaki campaigned in Kagoshima city on behalf of Ito and took aim at Mitazono's policies, stating that "he can't run the prefecture while being influenced by the Communist Party".

== Results ==
Difference of votes of rates obtained by Mitazono (blue) and Ito (yellow): Mitazono was more supported in mainland cities like Kagoshima and Ibusuki, while Ito was more supported in islands, such as Ōsumi, Tokara, Amami, as well as Nagashima

Mitazono won the two-candidate race, receiving 55.5% of the overall vote and 57.7% in the largely-populated cities of the prefecture. Ito received 59.1% in the smaller towns and villages. In Satsumasendai, the location of the Sendai Nuclear Power Plant, Mitazono defeated Ito by just seven votes.

Mitazono's victory was seen as a "strong anti-nuclear statement" and Mitazono confirmed he would seek the suspension of operations at Sendai and further assessment of the plant's safety.

Ito, who saw his support drop to 44.5% from the 66.3% he received in the two-candidate 2012 election, avoided speculating on the reasons for his loss during a speech he made on the night of the election. He stated that he had left the prefecture in a "perfect condition" during his twelve years of office and had a strong conviction that only he could properly handle the next few years. He admitted that he "forthrightly accepted" the result, but added that victory or loss appeared to be a "matter of chance." During the speech he repeated that he felt the electorate understood his policies, while he was "a bit worried" about the future governance of the prefecture and that he thought it was "something he should not have to say".

Turnout at the election was 56.77%, an almost 13% increase on the previous election in 2012. This was due to an election for the national House of Councillors being conducted on the same day. The village of Toshima, which consists of the Tokara Islands located off the coast of Kyushu, conducted voting on 7 July so that the votes could be counted in Kagoshima city on the 10th. However, poor weather conditions meant that 439 ballots submitted on four of the islands could not be collected on time and were not counted until the 11th.

2016 Kagoshima Prefecture Gubernatorial Election
| Party | Candidate | Votes | % | ±% |
|---|---|---|---|---|
| Independent | Satoshi Mitazono (Endorsed by Democratic, Social Democratic parties) | 426,471 | 55.48 | +55.48 |
| Independent | Yuichiro Ito (Incumbent) (Endorsed by Liberal Democratic, Komeito parties) | 342,239 | 44.52 | −21.76 |
| Total valid votes | | 768,710 | 98.95 | -0.25 |
| Informal votes | | 50,899 | 1.05 | +0.25 |
| Turnout | | 776,890 | 56.77 | +12.92 |
