= Walter Hennig =

Olaf Walter Hennig is a discreet South African businessman based in London. He is known for his involvement in the Black Economic Empowerment programme and his experience in the mining industry.

Hennig was born on 7 October 1972. After graduating from Stellenbosch University in 1993, he emigrated to Angola to pursue opportunities in the mining industry. He now has business interests in South Africa and the United Kingdom, according to UK Companies House records of Yoshiko Enterprises Limited. He has expertise in emerging markets, namely Africa., where he has developed diamond and metal concessions. Hennig traded diamonds, first in Angola and later the Democratic Republic of the Congo and other locations.

Hennig is also known for hosting New Year's Eve events at a private venue in Clifton, Cape Town, which are well attended by celebrities and politicians.

== Business career ==
=== Palladino Holdings Ltd ===
Walter Hennig founded Palladino in 2003 with a vision of creating an investment vehicle to consolidate various strategic assets in Africa. Palladino focuses on early stage predominantly African resource, property and industrial projects and it currently holds a variety of significant energy, mining and other assets in Africa.

=== Africa Management Limited ===
In January 2008 Mvelaphanda Holdings, OZ Management (a subsidiary of Och-Ziff Capital Management Group) and Palladino Holdings announced the creation of a new joint venture, Africa Management Limited.

As part of the joint venture, Africa Management Limited established African Global Capital, as a vehicle for investment in both the private and public markets across Africa, focusing on natural resources and related opportunities.

Tokyo Sexwale, founder of Mvelaphanda (Mvela) Holdings, said: "We intend to build on our already strong foothold in African investments in partnership with Och-Ziff. The partnership with Och-Ziff in African Global Capital will help us accelerate in building the leading African investment firm."

Mvela Holdings is a privately owned investment company founded in 1998 by Tokyo Sexwale, Mikki Xayiya and Mark Willcox. Mvela Holdings is the controlling shareholder of Mvelaphanda Group and has a significant interests in Mvelaphanda Resources.

== Business associates ==
In the past, Hennig has been linked to the following individuals in a business context:

- Jan Kulczyk, said to be Poland's richest man;
- Lloyd Pengilly, a former Johannesburg gold analyst and now with JPMorgan Cazenove;
- Vanja Baros, Africa Director of the Och-Ziff Capital Management Group. Baros led Och-Ziff's operations into Africa together with Walter Hennig and Mark Willcox.
- Clifford Elphick, a one-time personal assistant to Harry Oppenheimer and founder of Gem Diamonds;
- Mark Lifman South African underworld kingpin.

== Guinea Loan Agreement ==
=== Background ===
In April 2011, following a period during which Palladino advised the Government of Guinea on renovating and invigorating Guinea's mining industry, Palladino Capital agreed a US$25 million loan to finance the establishment of a state-run mining company. The agreement was signed by Mohamed Lamine Fofana, the Guinean mining minister and Guinea's finance minister, Kerfalla Yansane and Samuel Mebiane, who was listed as a "proxy holder" for Palladino.

The terms of the loan included a conversion clause which meant that if the Guinea government defaulted, they could repay the debt by conversion or 'payment in kind'. This could have taken the form of an equivalent value in shares in the operations of one of the subsidiaries of the national mining company to a maximum of 30% stake.

In January 2012, Palladino C2 wrote to the Minister of Mines requiring an account of how the funds had been utilised. In the absence of a reply, formal notice was given by Palladino C2 requiring an immediate repayment of the loan, with interest. The loan was repaid on 11 July 2012.

=== Allegations about the Loan Agreement ===
In June 2012, the Sunday Times published an article about the Loan Agreement, and focussed on the default provision included in the agreement. It added that the loan had never been publicly revealed to Guineans, or ticked off in the national budget, although President Alpha Condé has said that "contracts that commit Guinea will be published on the Internet."

Former Guinean Minister of Mines, Mahmoud Thiam was quoted in various newspapers as alleging that the deal was a quid pro quo in return for Condé campaign support.

The Mail & Guardian alleged that as a result of the loan to Guinea, Guinea would not be permitted to sell any state interest in a mining asset without first offering the option to Palladino and should the firm wish to acquire a stake in a mining asset, it would be granted the privilege of a six-month negotiating period. If a deal could not then be struck, Guinea would only be allowed to negotiate with a third party without first right of refusal from Palladino.

==== Response from Palladino ====
Following the publication of the Sunday Times article, Hennig's company, Palladino, issued a number of public statements about the Loan Agreement. Palladino highlighted that the Loan Agreement contained customary default provisions but given the limited cash resources of the government, it also provided that in event of a default it could be repaid in cash and/or in kind. Lawyers emphasised that this repayment could not legally exceed the value of the debt due under the loan agreement and said that it could "in no way result in the appropriation of 30 percent of private or national assets worth billions of dollars".

==== Response from the Guinean Government ====
===== Public statement =====
The Guinean government also refuted the allegations made by The Sunday Times and affirmed that there was no automatic convertibility to a 30 per cent stake in Soguipami in case of default. Guinea's minister of mines said that repayment would be at a value linked to the loan amount and accumulated interest and added that "the probability of Soguipami defaulting on this loan is minimal". The government also emphasised that the loan was not taken out by the Republic of Guinea, but by Soguipami, a parastatal entity that was set up in September 2011 to manage the government's stakes in mining contracts. It was clarified that the loan was not collateralised by Soguipami itself, but by one of its subsidiaries.

===== CNT investigation =====
The CNT, the country's acting legislative body, convened a special plenary session on 28 June 2012, and called upon the two ministers to explain the agreement. Both ministers defended the legality of their actions and explained that the funds had been sought for the operationalisation of the National Mining Company. The funds were kept in an account at the Central Bank foreign holdings. No evidence of wrongdoing was found by the CNT and the matter has been dropped. Government official have announced that the full amount of the loan along with interests has been paid to the lenders thus concluding the matter.

== Personal life ==
.
