= Yūichirō =

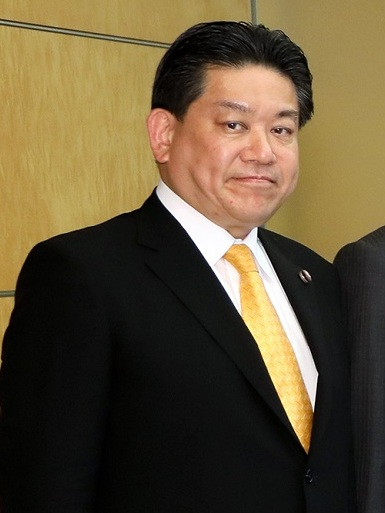
- Yuichiro Hata (1967–2020), Japanese politician
- Pronunciation: jɯɯitɕiɾoɯ (IPA)
- Gender: Male

Origin
- Origin: Japanese
- Meaning: Different meanings depending on the kanji used

Other names
- Alternative spelling: Yuitiro (Kunrei-shiki) Yuitiro (Nihon-shiki) Yūichirō, Yuichiro, Yuuichirou (Hepburn)

Yūichirō, Yuichiro, Yuuichirou or Yuuichiroh is a masculine Japanese given name.

== Written forms ==
Yūichirō can be written using different combinations of kanji characters. Some examples:

The characters used for "ichiro" (一郎) literally means "first son" and usually used as a suffix to a masculine name, especially for the oldest son. The "yu" part of the name can use a variety of characters, each of which will change the meaning of the name ("勇" for courage, "優" for kindness, "悠" and so on).

- 勇一郎, "courage, first son"
- 雄一郎, "masculine, first son"
- 優一郎, "kindness, first son"
- 裕一郎, "abundant, first son"
- 佑一郎, "to help, first son"

Other combinations...

- 勇市郎, "courage, city, son"
- 雄市郎, "masculine, city, son"
- 裕市郎, "abundant, city, son"
- 佑市郎, "to help, city, son"

The name can also be written in hiragana ゆういちろう or katakana ユウイチロウ.

== Notable people with the name ==
- Yuichiro Ando (born 1959), Japanese-American painter
- Yuichiro Hata (羽田 雄一郎; 1967–2020), Japanese politician
- Yuichiro Hayashi (林 祐一郎), Japanese director
- Yuichiro Ito (伊藤 祐一郎; born 1947), Japanese politician
- Yuichiro Komiya (小宮 雄一郎; born 1992), Japanese volleyball player
- Yuichiro Miura (三浦 雄一郎; born 1932), Japanese mountain climber
- Yuichiro Nagai (永井 雄一郎; born 1979), Japanese footballer
- Yuichiro Nagashima (長島 雄一郎; born 1984), Japanese kickboxer
- Yuichiro Tamaki (玉木 雄一郎), Japanese politician
- Yuichiro Ueno (上野 裕一郎; born 1985), Japanese long-distance runner
- Yūichirō Umehara (梅原 裕一郎; born 1991), Japanese voice actor
- Yuichiro Uozumi (魚住 裕一郎; born 1952), Japanese politician

== Fictional characters with the name ==
- Yūichirō Hyakuya (百夜 優一郎; Birth name: Yūichirō Amane), main character of the manga Seraph of the End
- Yuichiro Tokito, a character in Demon Slayer: Kimetsu no Yaiba
