= Torao Tokuda =

Japanese politician (1938–2024)

- 徳田 虎雄

Member of the House of Representatives
- In office 26 June 2000 – 8 August 2005
- Preceded by: Shūkō Sonoda
- Succeeded by: Takeshi Tokuda
- Constituency: Kagoshima 2nd
- In office 19 February 1990 – 27 September 1996
- Preceded by: Okiharu Yasuoka
- Succeeded by: Constituency abolished
- Constituency: Amami Islands (1990–1993); Kagoshima 1st (1993–1996)

Personal details
- Born: 17 February 1938 Takasago, Hyōgo, Japan
- Died: 10 July 2024 (aged 86) Kamakura, Kanagawa, Japan
- Party: Liberal League
- Other political affiliations: Independent (before 1993; 1993–1994); Liberal Democratic (1993)
- Children: Takeshi Tokuda
- Education: Osaka University
- Occupation: Doctor

Torao Tokuda (Japanese: 徳田虎雄 Tokuda Torao; 17 February 1938 – 10 July 2024) was a Japanese politician. A member of the Liberal Democratic Party and later the Liberal League, he served in the House of Representatives from 1990 to 1996 and again from 2000 to 2005.

== Early life ==
Torao Tokuda was born in Hyogo Prefecture on 17 February 1938. He and His family moved to Tokunoshima island, Kagoshima Prefecture when he was at the age of two.

When Tokuda was in third grade, his 3-year-old brother fell ill. As his brother suffered severe diarrhea and vomiting during one particular night, he tried to reach a doctor, which is said to have required him to run along an unlit mountain road. The doctor is said to have refused the request by Tokuda's house call, and soon thereafter Tokuda's brother succumbed to his illness.

Tokuda aspired to be a doctor, which led to him transferring from his local high school in Tokunoshima to one in Osaka Prefecture. After high school, he was accepted into the medical school of Osaka University. He graduated with a PhD in 1966.

== Professional life ==
Torao Tokuda aimed to open his own hospital, citing his disillusionment with the existing "contradictions in Japanese medical care" as a reason. However, he lacked the funds for it, having to use his life insurance policy as collateral to obtain a loan from a bank.

In 1973, at the age of 35, he managed to open a private hospital named Tokuda Hospital ("徳田病院") in Osaka Prefecture. The hospital's main focus was on Emergency medicine. This fact has been attributed to his experience as a child, witnessing his brother passing after not being able to reach an available medical professional, as well as his own fear that he, too, might succumb without being able to receive medical treatment.

He founded the medical group Tokushukai in 1975, naming it after his hometown and island Tokunoshima. The same year, he opened a second private hospital, named Nozaki Hospital ("野崎病院") in Osaka Prefecture. The latter part of the 70s was difficult for Tokushukai, as they struggled to gather enough funding and personnel. Despite this, by the end of the decade, 5 more hospitals would be opened by the medical group. Kishiwada Tokushukai Hospital opened in 1977 and Yao Tokushukai Hospital in 1978. In 1979, Tokushukai expanded beyond Osaka Prefecture, opening Nanbu Tokushukai Hospital (Okinawa Prefecture), Fukuoka Tokushukai Hospital, and Uji Tokushukai Hospital (Kyoto Prefecture).

By the 1980s, Tokushukai had started expanding into eastern Japan, contributing to the decline of local medical care associations.

Tokuda ran in the House of representatives election on a platform of medical reform. He lost the election twice, before being elected to the position In 1990 by a small margin of votes. After being elected to the lower house of the House of Representatives, he served four terms, retiring in 2005 due to medical complications.

In 1995, immediately after the Great Hanshin earthquake, Tokuda used his position as Honorary President of Tokushukai to initiate emergency medical relief to affected areas.

In 1996, Tokuda became president of the Japan Gymnastics Association and founded the Tokushukai Gymnastics Club within the Tokushukai group.

== Later life, Illness and death ==
In April 2002, Tokuda was diagnosed with ALS. Despite the gradual paralysis he experienced due to the neurodegenerative nature of his disease, he continued to visit various hospitals owned by Tokushukai up until 2012.

In the later part of 2012, a leak by the then Secretary General of Tokushukai publicized alleged cases of the Tokuda family's illicit affairs, sexual assault, election fraud, and illegal financial meddling in Japanese politics.

It was revealed that Torao Tokuda participated in meddling with the 2012 House of Representatives election, in order to give an unfair advantage to his son. As a result, his son Takeshi Tokuda, whom the leaks had already separately implicated in a case of sexual assault, resigned as Parliamentary Secretary and soon thereafter as a member of the House of Representatives. The scandal also implicated the Tokyo governor, who, too, resigned.

The fallout from what is commonly now called "The Tokushukai Incident" led to several sentences for Tokushukai personnel as well as resignations from politicians. The Tokyo District Public Prosecutors' Office Special Investigation Division investigated Torao Tokuda, pointing to him as the "overall leader" but chose to not prosecute, citing his age and terminal illness.

In October 2013, at the age of 75, he officially resigned as chairman of Tokushukai Medical Group.

Tokuda was awarded the title of Honorary Chairman of Tokushukai Medical Corporation in 2020.

He succumbed to Amyotrophic lateral sclerosis (ALS) on the night of the 10th of July, 2024. He passed in the city of Kamakura, Kanagawa Prefecture at the age of 86.
