= Kagoshima 2nd district =

Legislative district of Japan

Kagoshima 2nd District
- 鹿児島県第2区
- Parliamentary constituency for the Japanese House of Representatives
- Prefecture: Kagoshima
- Proportional District: Kyushu
- Electorate: 334,582 (as of September 2022)

Current constituency
- Created: 1994
- Seats: One
- Party: LDP
- Representative: Satoshi Mitazono

Kagoshima 2nd district (鹿児島[県第]2区, Kagoshima[-ken dai-]ni-ku) is a single-member electoral district of the House of Representatives, the lower house of the National Diet of Japan. The district covers two different parts of Kagoshima Prefecture. On the main island of Kyushu, it covers most of the Satsuma Peninsula; this includes the cities of Makurazaki, Ibusuki, Minamisatsuma, and Minamikyūshū, as well as the former municipalities Taniyama City and Kiire Town, which are now a part of the capital Kagoshima City. The district also includes Ōshima Subprefecture, which covers the Amami Islands more than 300 kilometres (186 miles) to the south, which includes the city of Amami. In 2021, the district had 337,660 eligible voters.

From 2000 to 2014, the district was represented by the Tokuda family, which runs the Tokushūkai hospital group. A political funds scandal in 2013 over donations from Tokushūkai led to the resignations of Tokyo governor Naoki Inose and Representative Takeshi Tokuda. The Liberal Democratic Party (LDP) still managed to hold the district until 2021, when it was won by former Governor of Kagoshima Prefecture Satoshi Mitazono, who ran as an independent candidate.

== List of representatives ==
| Representative | Party | Dates | Notes |
|---|---|---|---|
| Shūkō Sonoda | LDP | 1996–2000 | |
| Torao Tokuda | Liberal League | 2000–2005 | Re-elected at the 2003 general election |
| Takeshi Tokuda | Independent | 2005–2009 | Joined the LDP in 2006 |
| Takeshi Tokuda | LDP | 2009–2014 | Resigned from his seat in February 2014 |
| Masuo Kaneko | LDP | 2014–2021 | Won April 2014 by-election and re-elected in 2014 general election |
| Satoshi Mitazono | Independent | 2021–2026 | |
| Satoshi Mitazono | LDP | 2026– | Joined the LDP in 2025 |

== Election results ==
2026
| Party | Candidate | Votes | % | ±% |
|---|---|---|---|---|
| LDP | Satoshi Mitazono | 115,396 | 68.5 | |
| Sanseitō | Norimi Takahashi | 35,570 | 21.1 | ▲16.6 |
| JCP | Makoto Matsuzaki | 17,543 | 10.4 | ▲3.4 |
| Registered electors | | 321,956 | | |
| Turnout | | | 54.46 | ▼0.10 |
| LDP hold | | | | |

2024
| Party | Candidate | Votes | % | ±% |
|---|---|---|---|---|
| Independent | Satoshi Mitazono | 80,397 | 45.91 | ▼1.79 |
| LDP | Hirotake Yasuoka | 58,847 | 27.32 | ▼14.12 |
| Ishin | Kentaro Tsuji | 19,649 | 11.22 | |
| JCP | Makoto Matsuzaki | 12,255 | 7.00 | ▼3.86 |
| Sanseitō | Yukari Yatake | 7,982 | 4.56 | |
| Turnout | | 175,130 | 54.56 | ▼4.02 |
| Independent hold | | | | |

2021
| Party | Candidate | Votes | % | ±% |
|---|---|---|---|---|
| Independent | Satoshi Mitazono | 92,614 | 47.7 | |
| LDP | Masuo Kaneko | 80,469 | 41.4 | ▼9.8 |
| JCP | Makoto Matsuzaki | 21,084 | 10.9 | ▲2.4 |
| Turnout | | | 58.58 | ▲2.48 |
| Independent gain from LDP | | | | |

2017
| Party | Candidate | Votes | % | ±% |
|---|---|---|---|---|
| LDP | Masuo Kaneko | 97,743 | 51.2 | ▼23.0 |
| Kibō no Tō | Kayo Saitō | 43,331 | 22.7 | |
| Independent | Kenji Hayashi | 33,317 | 17.5 | |
| JCP | Mitsuharu Iwaizako | 16,280 | 8.5 | ▼17.3 |
| Turnout | | | 56.10 | ▲8.99 |
| LDP hold | | | | |

2014
| Party | Candidate | Votes | % | ±% |
|---|---|---|---|---|
| LDP | 'Masuo Kaneko'(endorsed by Komeito) | 91,670 | 74.2 | |
| JCP | Mitsuharu Iwaizako | 31,823 | 25.8 | |
| Turnout | | 277,830 | 47.11 | ▼13.44 |
| LDP hold | | | | |

April 2014 By-election
| Party | Candidate | Votes | % | ±% |
|---|---|---|---|---|
| LDP | Masuo Kaneko (endorsed by Komeito) | 66,360 | 52.6 | |
| Independent | Akashi Uchikoshi (Endorsed by Democratic, Restoration, Unity and People's Life parties) | 46,021 | 36.5 | |
| Shintō Hitori Hitori | Yoshiko Arikawa | 5,507 | 4.6 | |
| JCP | Terashi Mishima | 5,507 | 4.4 | |
| Happiness Realization | Isao Matsuzawa | 1,283 | 1.0 | |
| Independent | Toshiaki Seki | 1,152 | 0.9 | |
| Turnout | | 279,787 | 60.55 | ▼13.63 |
| LDP hold | | | | |

2012
| Party | Candidate | Votes | % | ±% |
|---|---|---|---|---|
| LDP | Takeshi Tokuda (Incumbent) (endorsed by Komeito) | 109,744 | 66.7 | |
| Democratic | Akashi Uchikoshi (PR block incumbent) (endorsed by People's New Party) | 45,707 | 27.8 | |
| JCP | Terashi Mishima | 9,177 | 5.6 | |
| Turnout | | 281,457 | 74.18 | ▲0.37 |
| LDP hold | | | | |

2009
| Party | Candidate | Votes | % | ±% |
|---|---|---|---|---|
| LDP | Takeshi Tokuda (Incumbent) | 114,102 | 55.7 | |
| Democratic | Akashi Uchikoshi Was elected to Kyūshū PR block | 88,562 | 43.2 | |
| Happiness Realization | Mifuko Kamimura | 1,169 | 1.1 | |
| Turnout | | 283,503 | 73.81 | ▲2.22 |
| LDP gain from Independent | | | | |

2005
| Party | Candidate | Votes | % | ±% |
|---|---|---|---|---|
| Independent | Takeshi Tokuda | 112,437 | 53.48 | |
| LDP | Shuko Sonoda | 71,858 | 35.15 | |
| Independent | Akashi Uchikoshi | 44,853 | 21.94 | |
| Turnout | | | | |
| Independent gain from Liberal League | | | | |

2003
| Party | Candidate | Votes | % | ±% |
|---|---|---|---|---|
| Liberal League | Torao Tokuda (Incumbent) | 97,423 | 49.1 | |
| LDP | Shuko Sonoda | 90,952 | 45.9 | |
| JCP | Toshiaki Seki | 9,903 | 5.0 | |
| Turnout | | | | |
| Liberal League hold | | | | |

2000
| Party | Candidate | Votes | % | ±% |
|---|---|---|---|---|
| Liberal League | Torao Tokuda | 102,233 | 50.3 | |
| LDP | Shuko Sonoda (Incumbent) | 91,162 | 44.9 | |
| JCP | Haruki Yamaguchi | 9,744 | 4.8 | |
| Turnout | | | | |
| Liberal League gain from LDP | | | | |

1996
| Party | Candidate | Votes | % | ±% |
|---|---|---|---|---|
| LDP | Shuko Sonoda | 87,471 | 47.9 | |
| Liberal League | Torao Tokuda | 84,448 | 46.3 | |
| JCP | Seiki Katsurada | 10,618 | 5.8 | |
| Turnout | | | | |
| LDP win (new seat) | | | | |
