= Palladini =

Surname list

Palladini is a surname. Notable people with the surname include:

- Al Palladini (1943–2001), Canadian provincial politician
- David Palladini (1946–2019), American illustrator

== See also ==
- Palladino
