= Japanese La Salle Academy =

Coordinates: 31.529601°N 130.527847°E

La Salle Junior and Senior High School
- ラ・サール中学校・高等学校

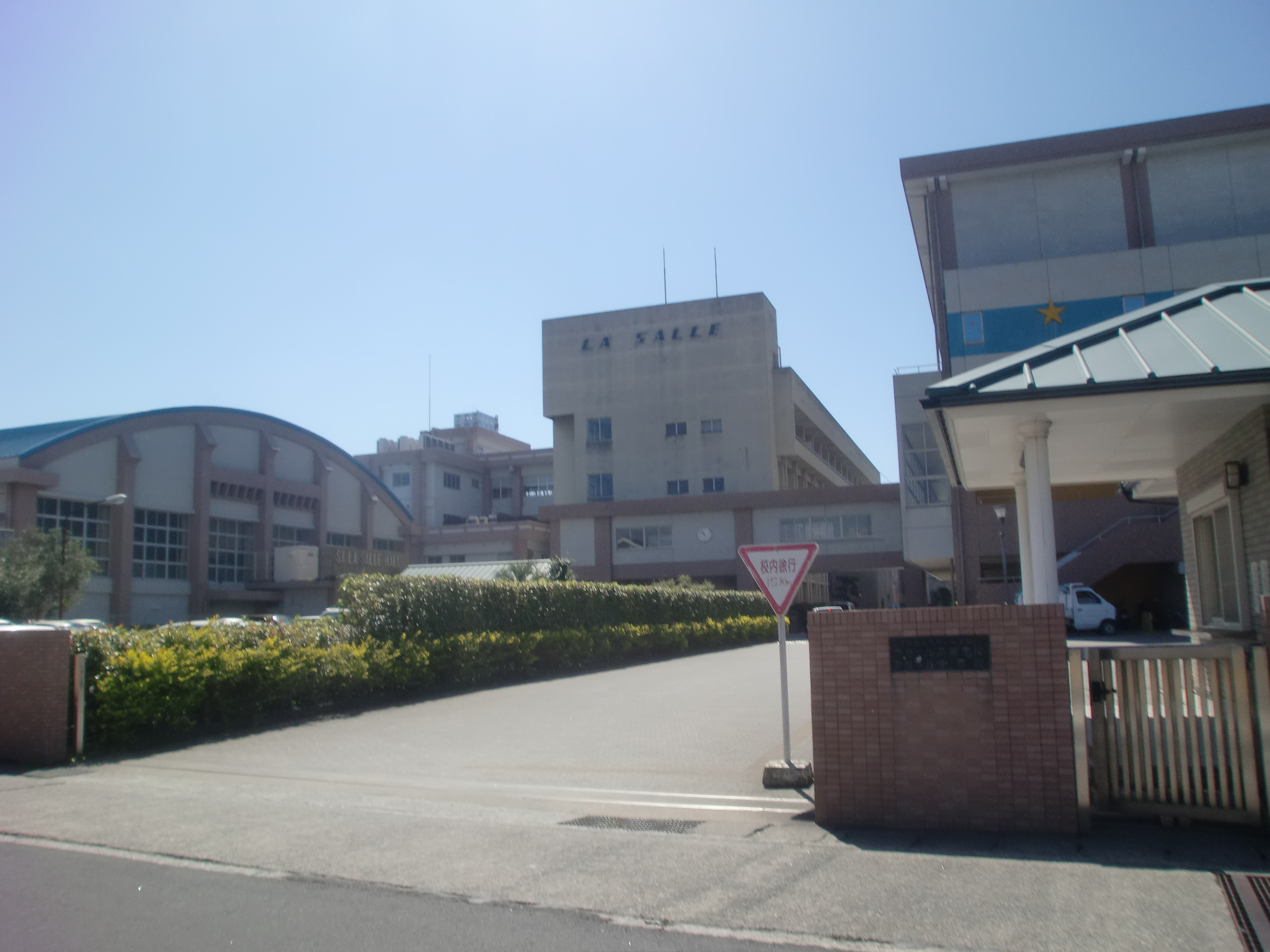
- 10-1, Komatsubara 2-chome, Kagoshima, Kagoshima Prefecture, Japan

Information
- Type: Private
- Established: 1950; 76 years ago
- Headmaster: Domingo Villamil
- Enrollment: 220 per grade (160 are from La Salle Junior High School, the affiliate school of La Salle High School)
- Campus: Suburban
- Website: www.lasalle.ed.jp

La Salle Junior and Senior High School (ラ・サール中学校・高等学校, Rasāru Chūgakkō Kōtōgakkō), commonly referred to as "La Salle", is a private boys' school for secondary education located in Kagoshima, Kagoshima Prefecture, Japan. De La Salle Brothers runs this school.

== La Salle Senior High School ==
La Salle senior high school was established in Kagoshima in 1950.

== La Salle Junior High School ==
La Salle junior high school was established in 1955.

== Notable alumni ==
=== Entertainment ===
- Shun Nakahara, film director
- LaSalle Ishii, actor and Owarai tarento
- Peter, openly gay actor and dancer
- Daihachi Yoshida, film director

=== Politics & Government ===
==== National Diet ====
- Kazuaki Miyaji, former member of the House of Representatives
- Koriki Jojima, former member
- Takeshi Iwaya, current member and former Minister of Defense
- Yasushi Furukawa, current member of former governor of Saga Prefecture
- Hiroshi Kawauchi, former member
- Yoshihisa Furukawa, current member
- Tetsuro Nomura, member of the House of Councillors

==== Governors ====
- Yūichirō Itō, former governor of Kagoshima Prefecture
- Kōichi Shiota, current governor of Kagoshima Prefecture
- Yoshinori Yamaguchi, current governor of Saga Prefecture

==== Other ====
- Nariaki Nakayama, leader of Kibō no Tō
- Hiroshi Maruyama, current ambassador to Estonia and Finland

=== Science & Culture ===
- Masazumi Harada, medical researcher
- Hiroshi Nishihara, chemist
- Izumi Tabata, health scientist
- Sunao Yoshida, novelist
- Hideyuki Arata, engineer

== In popular culture ==
- Riku Onda's 2000 novel Neverland and its 2001 TBS adaptation are implied to be set at La Salle.
- An NHK documentary entitled Wakamonotachi wa Ima was shot at the school from 1974 to 1978.
