= Paladino =

Paladino is a surname of Italian origin. The name is the Italian word for paladin. Notable people with the surname include:

- Carl Paladino (born 1946), American businessman and politician
- Giovanni Paolo Paladino (fl. 1540–1560), Italian composer and lutenist
- Joe Paladino (born 1965), English footballer and coach
- Juan Paladino (1925–1996), Uruguayan fencer
- Mimmo Paladino (born Domenico Paladino, 1948), Italian artist
- Santi Paladino (1902–1981), Italian journalist, politician and writer
- Silvie Paladino (born 1971), Australian entertainer
- Sascha Paladino (born 1976), American film director and stepbrother of banjo player Bela Fleck

Fictional characters:

- Simon J. Paladino or Gazerbeam, a fictional character from the 2004 film The Incredibles

== See also ==
- Parque Abraham Paladino, a multi-use stadium in Montevideo, Uruguay
- Palladino, a surname
- Palatino (disambiguation)
