= Giuseppe Paladino =

Giuseppe Paladino may refer to:

- Joe Paladino (born 1965), English football coach and former goalkeeper
- Giuseppe Paladino (1721–1794), Italian painter
