= List of compositions by Frederic Rzewski =

This is a list of compositions by Frederic Rzewski.

== Stage ==
- The Persians, opera (1985)
- The Triumph of Death, opera (1987–88)

== Orchestral ==
- Nature Morte, for small orchestra (1964)
- A Long Time Man, for piano and orchestra (1979)
- Satyrica, for guitar, double bass, piano, synthesizer, vibraphone, percussion, and symphony band (1983)
- Una Breve Storia d'Estate, for three flutes and orchestra (1983)
- Scratch Symphony (1997)
- Movable Types (1999)
- Bring Them Home!, for two percussion, two pianos and orchestra (2004), arranged for two percussion and two pianos
- Piano Concerto, for piano and orchestra (2013)
- A Dog's Life, for piano and orchestra (2014)

== Chamber ==
- String Quartet (1955)
- Trio, for flute, trumpet and piano (1956)
- Pfi, for 2 flutes, percussion, cello and piano (1963)
- Speculum Dianae, for any eight improvisational players (1964)
- Prose Pieces, for improvisational ensemble (1967–68)
- Les Moutons de Panurge, for any number of melody instruments (1968)
- Last Judgment, for trombone or any number of unison trombones (1969)
- Second Structure, for improvisational ensemble (1972)
- Song and Dance, for flute, bass clarinet, double bass and vibraphone (1976)
- Thirteen Instrumental Studies, for a variable ensemble (1972–77)
- Moonrise with Memories, for bass trombone and ensemble (1978)
- Three Pieces, for soprano saxophone, trombone and piano (1978-81)
- Wails, for bass clarinet, piano and two percussion (1984)
- Spots, for any four players (1986)
- Don't Have it Today, for any player and double bass (1986)
- The Lost Melody, for clarinet, piano and two percussion (1989)
- Roses, for flute, clarinet, trumpet, tuba, violin, cello, accordion and percussion (1989)
- Aerial Tarts, for flute, clarinet, violin, cello, piano and two percussion (1990)
- Whangdoodles, for hammer dulcimer, violin and piano (1990)
- Holes, for any four to eight players (1993)
- Crusoe, for any four to twelve players (1993)
- Histories, for four saxophones (1993)
- Whimwhams, for marimba and string quartet (1993)
- Family Scenes, for flute, three saxophones, French horn, three trumpets, two trombones, bass trombone, double bass and piano (1995)
- When the Wind Blows, for flute, soprano saxophone, tenor saxophone, baritone saxophone, flügelhorn, trombone, guitar, double bass and piano (1996)
- Spiritus, for four recorders and percussion (1997)
- For Hanns, for flute, clarinet, cello and piano (1998)
- Trio, for violin, cello and piano (1998)
- Main Drag, for percussion and eight or more players (1999)
- Cradle Rock, for flute, soprano saxophone, tenor saxophone, baritone saxophone, flügelhorn, trombone, guitar, double bass and piano (1999)
- Pocket Symphony, for flute, clarinet, violin, cello, piano and percussion (2000)
- 96, for five players (2003)
- Bring Them Home!, for two percussion and two pianos (2004), arranged from two percussion, two pianos and orchestra version
- Fortune, for four speaking violists (2005)
- Snaps, for piano and string quartet (2005)
- Spoils, for various instrumentations (2005)
- Natural Things, for clarinet, saxophone, 2 percussion, violin, cello and piano (2007)
- Knight, Death, and Devil, for alto flute, bass clarinet, percussion, three violins, viola, two cellos and piano (2007-08)
- Blah!, for eight wind players (2009)
- Flowers 2, for alto saxophone, xylophone and piano (2009)
- Reeds, for oboe, clarinet, bass clarinet, alto saxophone and bassoon (2009)
- Brussels Diary, for flute, clarinet, violin, cello and piano (2010)
- Hard Cuts, for piano and ensemble (2011)
- 16 Sneakers, for several violas (2012), or for viola
- Notasonata, for violin and piano (2015)
- Satires, for violin and piano (2015)
- Demons, for violin and piano (2017)
- Words, for string quartet (2018)

== Instrumental ==
- Selfportrait, for any player (1964)
- Last Judgement, for trombone (1969)
- Aria, for flute (1981)
- Pennywhistlers, for recorder (1981)
- Lost and Found, for speaking percussionist (1985)
- To the Earth, for speaking percussionist (1985)
- Shtick, for clarinet (1990)
- Knight, for cello (1992)
- Honk, for tuba (2004)
- Mollitude, for flute (2006)
- Fall of the Empire, for solo percussionist, spoken word and multi percussion (2007)
- 16 Sneakers, for violas (2012), or for several viola

== Choral ==
- Requiem, Part 1, for speaker, male chorus, Jew's harp, piano, organ, tubular bells, bull-roarer, woodblock, and radio (1963–67)
- Struggle Song, for mixed chorus (1973)
- Le silence des Espaces Infinis, for female chorus, any player, seven orchestral groups, and tape (1980)
- Stop the War!, for mixed chorus (1995)
- Stop the Testing!, for mixed chorus (1995)
- Ode to the Deserter, for mixed chorus and accompaniment (2013)

== Vocal ==
- Jefferson, for voice and piano (1970)
- Freud, for voice (1970)
- Coming Together, for speaker and variable ensemble (1971)
- Attica, for speaker and variable ensemble (1972)
- Struggle Song, for voice and variable ensemble (1973)
- Nothing Changes, for voice and piano (1976)
- The Price of Oil, for two voices, eight amplified pipe ensembles and any two similar ensembles (1980)
- Snacks, for voice, mixed chorus ad libitum, and any ensemble ad libitum (1981)
- Antigone-Legend, for voice and piano (1982)
- Egyptian Songs, for voice and piano (1982)
- Songs, for voice and piano (1973–83)
- The Liar, for voice and piano (1983)
- Mayakovsky, for speaker, piano, and string quartet (1984)
- Mary's Dream, for soprano, contrabass clarinet, cello, piano, and percussion (1984)
- Force, for two speakers, any two wind instruments, any two plucked instruments, two noisemakers and weigher ad libitum (1985)
- Chains, for speaker and 3 - 4 players (1986)
- Love Song, for voice and any player (1987)
- The Waves, for speaker and variable ensemble (1988)
- Tinkleberries, for voice and any number of players (1980–90)
- The Burghers of Rostock, for voice and piano (1992)
- The Love of Money, for voice and piano (1993)
- Snippets No. 1, for speaker and piano (1994)
- Logique, for voice, flute, cello, and piano (1997)
- Happy Birthday, for voice (1999)
- No More War, for eight voices (2005)
- Snippets No. 2, for speaker and piano (1994-2006)

== Piano ==
- Chain of Thought (1953)
- Tabakrauch (1954)
- Preludes (1957)
- Poem (1958)
- Introduction and Sonata, for two pianos (1959)
- Study I (1961)
- Study II (1961)
- Falling Music (1971)
- No Place to Go but around (1974)
- 36 Variations on 'The People United Will Never Be Defeated!' (1975)
- Four Pieces (1977)
- Squares (1978)
- North American Ballads (1978–79)
  - Dreadful Memories
  - Which Side are You on?
  - Down by the Riverside
  - Winnsboro Cotton Mill Blues, also for two pianos (1980)
- The Housewife's Lament, (originally for harpsichord rewritten for piano) (1980)
- A Machine, for two pianos (1984)
- Eggs (1986)
- Steptangle (1986)
- The Turtle and the Crane (1988)
- Mayn Yingele (1988)
- To His Coy Mistress, for singing or speaking pianist (1988)
- Fantasia (1989)
- Bumps (1990)
- Ludes (1990–91)
- Sonata (1991)
- De Profundis (1991–92)
- Andante con Moto (1992)
- A Life (1992)
- Night Crossing with Fisherman, for two pianos (1994)
- Fougues (1994)
- It Makes A Long Time Man Feel Bad, Ballade No.5 (1997, revised 2004, adapted from A Long Time Man)
- Michael Bakunin, Rentier, for speaking pianist (2000)
- When the Wind Blows, for two pianos (1996-2002)
- The Road (1995–2003)
  - Turns (1995)
  - Tracks (1996)
  - Tramps (1997)
  - Stops (1998)
  - A Few (1999)
  - Travelling with Children (1999)
  - Final Preparations (1999–2002)
  - The Big Day Arrives (2002–03)
- Johnny Has Gone for a Soldier (2003)
- Cadenza (2003), for Piano Concerto No.4, Op.58 by Beethoven
- Dust (2003)
- Spells (2004)
- Second Hand, for piano left hand (2005)
- Rubinstein in Berlin, for speaking pianist (2008)
- 10 War Songs (2008)
- Flowers 1, for speaking pianist (2009)
- Nanosonatas (2006-10)
- Etude (2010)
- 3 Piano Pieces (2011)
- Dear Diary, for speaking pianist (2014)
- Winter Nights (2014)
- Dreams, Part I (2014)
- Dreams, Part II (2015)
- Songs of Insurrection (2016)
- Saints and Sinners (2016)
- Ages (2017)
- 8 Nocturnes (2017)
- 6 Movements (2019)
- America: A Poem (2020)
- The Naked Truth (2021)

== Other ==
- Zoologischer Garten, for tape (1965)
