= Hideyuki Arata =

Japanese engineering scientist

- 新田 英之
- Born: Okinawa, Japan
- Education: University of Tokyo (BS, MS, PhD)
- Awards: Ishida Prize (2014); The Young Scientists' Prize by Minister of Education, Culture, Sports, Science and Technology (2015)
- Scientific career
- Fields: Electrical Engineering; Mechanical Engineering; Analytical Chemistry; Biophysics
- Workplaces: University of Tokyo; Curie Institute (Paris); Massachusetts Institute of Technology; RIKEN; Harvard University; Nagoya University

Hideyuki Arata (新田 英之, Arata Hideyuki; born in Okinawa) is a Japanese engineering scientist.

== Biography ==
He spent his childhood in Belmont, Massachusetts, while his father worked at Harvard University under Martin Karplus.

After graduating from Japanese La Salle Academy, he received his BS, MS, and PhD degrees all in electrical engineering, specialized in MEMS and Bio-MEMS, from the University of Tokyo. Following discussions with Phillip Allen Sharp, he expanded his research field into single molecule biophysics under the advisory of Jean-Louis Viovy at Curie Institute (Paris). After his postdoctoral training at Harvard–MIT Division of Health Sciences and Technology, and at RIKEN, he was appointed as a Group Leader/Designated Associate Professor at Graduate School of Science, Nagoya University in 2011. In 2014, he had an appointment as a visiting scholar (visiting associate professor) at Harvard University with David Weitz.

== Research ==
His work spans microengineering, nanotechnology, analytical chemistry and single molecule biophysics. He is the inventor of free rotation magnetic tweezers (FRMT) and he reported the first direct observation of DNA twisting induced by Rad51 single molecule using FRMT. He has delivered invited lectures at institutions worldwide including École Normale Supérieure (Paris), University of Tokyo, Peking University, ETH Zurich, Stanford University, Harvard University, and Massachusetts Institute of Technology. He serves as an editor in multiple academic journals such as The Journal of Engineering (UK), Frontiers in Bioscience (USA), Frontiers in Bioengineering and Biotechnology (Switzerland).

== Music ==
Alongside his scientific career, he has remained active as an amateur pianist. His serious activity as an amateur pianist drove American composer Frederic Rzewski to dedicate Nanosonata (2006) to him. During his stay in Paris, he studied the piano under Olivier Gardon. He also studied under Pascal Rogé and Philippe Entremont at Conservatoire de Nice summer academie, and Gabriel Tacchino at Mozarteum University of Salzburg.

== Honors and awards ==
He received numerous awards including Young Engineers Award by the Japan Society of Mechanical Engineers (jp) (2005, the youngest awardee), Ishida Prize by Nagoya University (2014), and The Young Scientists' Prize by Minister of Education, Culture, Sports, Science and Technology (2015). He is an alumnus of the 61st. Lindau Nobel Laureate Meetings, when he honored the support from Boehringer Ingelheim Foundation and Japan Society for the Promotion of Science. He also acted as an Alumuni peer reviewer of the meeting in 2021 and in 2023.
