= The Beerhouse =

Beer hall in Cape Town, South Africa

Coordinates: 33°55′31.49″S 18°24′57.70″E

Beerhouse
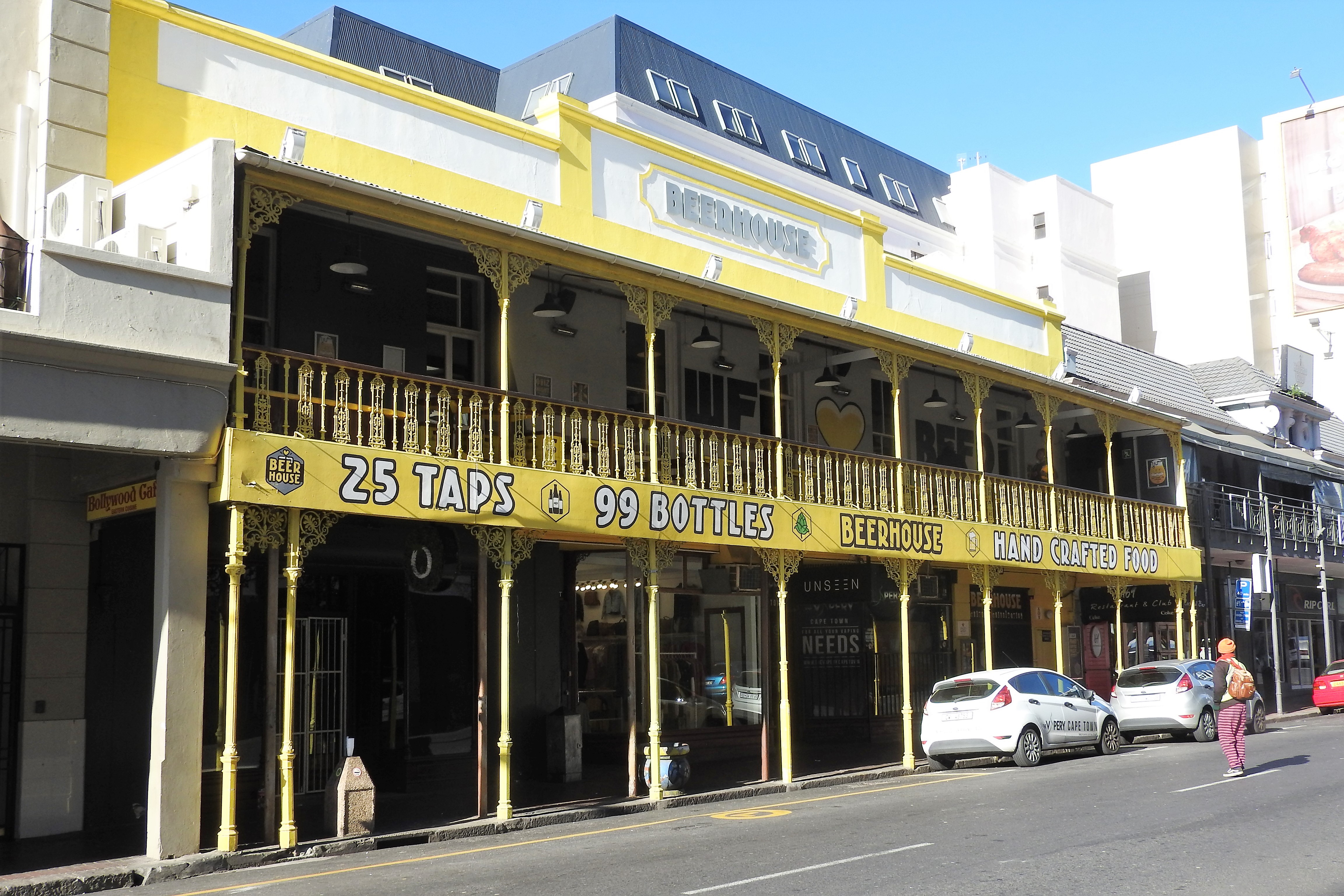
- Trade name: Beerhouse
- Industry: Service - Food & Beverage
- Founded: August 2, 2013; 13 years ago in Cape Town, South Africa
- Founder: Randolf Jorberg
- Headquarters: 223 Long Street, Cape Town, South Africa
- Number of locations: 1 (2018)
- Area served: Cape Town,
- Key people: Randolf Jorberg
- Products: Beer, Craft Beer
- Website: http://www.beerhouse.co.za

The Beerhouse was a speciality beer hall which opened in Cape Town's Upper Long Street on International Beer Day, Friday 2 August 2013, and closed 11 years later, on 3 August, 2024.

Occupying a two-storey Victorian building, the former premises of Bead Merchants of Africa, The Beerhouse comprised a long bar, inside lounge/dining area and outside terrace with historic wrought-iron balcony.

The brainchild of German entrepreneur, Randolf Jorberg, Beerhouse stocked bottled and draught beer from 13 countries, 99 bottled beers of various styles all numbered and displayed on a beer wall, and 15- to 20 beers on tap.

As a proponent of the local craft beer revolution, Beerhouse had a strong bias towards supporting South African microbreweries of which the Western Cape boasts over 100. In addition to clear, weiss and experimental brews, traditional African beer, Umqombothi, made from corn, sorghum malt and yeast was available.

The Beerhouse carried through its theme with beer keg wash-basins in the washrooms and was featured in Thrillist's "21 Best Beer Bars in the World"

On Saturday 20 June, 2015, Beerhouse doorman Joe-Louis Kanyona was stabbed in the neck whilst on duty, and died a few minutes later.

Jorberg cited extortion as a major factor behind the closure of The Beerhouse.

== Brew Food Fusion ==
Beerhouse pioneered its Brew Food Fusion menu in August 2017 in association with TV's The Ultimate Braai Master Winner Piet Marais. The menu centred around meat prepared using beer and in-house hardwood smokers.

== Branches ==
=== Beerhouse Fourways ===
A second Beerhouse in Fourways, Johannesburg, opened in July 2014 and closed in August 2019.

=== Beerhouse Centurion ===
A third Beerhouse in Centurion closed permanently after just a short time

== Expansion ==
The Beerhouse aimed to open 20 Beerhouse outlets across South Africa by 2020.

== Murder and extortion ==
32-year old Joe-Louis Kanyona was hired as a doorman at Beerhouse in December 2014. At 10:37 p.m. on Saturday 20 June, 2015, Kanyona was approached by four men while he was standing guard at the Beerhouse’s front entrance. One of the men stabbed him in the neck, and the four fled the scene. Kanyona died a few minutes later.

The owner of Beerhouse, Randolf Jorberg, attributed the killing to his refusal to sign up for security protection services and extortion gang rivalry.

In September 2020, the then-Police Minister, Bheki Cele, visited The Beerhouse and spoke with Beerhouse staff in front of media to reassure them of their safety, and announced new pans to tackle and take on extortion. The next evening, individuals being investigated for various crimes also visited The Beerhouse. Shortly thereafter, investigating officer Charl Kinnear, a lieutenant colonel in the South African Police Service and section commander for the Western Cape anti-gang unit, was murdered.

Despite the fact that the safety and security branch’s response to extortion and organised crime is fractured, the South African Police Service is getting serious about combatting extortion.

Key figures with links to nightclub security in Cape Town have been arrested and appeared in court on charges of murder, attempted murder and other criminal activities in cases involving gang killings, intimidation, kidnapping and extortion.

== Legal and security challenges ==
In August 2024, Jorberg announced the closure of Beerhouse in Cape Town, attributing the decision largely to sustained extortion pressures. This closure came after a complex series of legal challenges and threats, including a defamation lawsuit filed shortly afterward by Mark Lifman, a controversial figure alleged to be involved in Cape Town’s protection rackets. Following Beerhouse's closure, Lifman demanded a retraction from Jorberg for statements linking him to local extortion gangs and criminal activities, including the 2015 murder of Beerhouse bouncer Joe-Louis Kanyona. When no retraction was issued, Lifman escalated his legal action, initially seeking R500,000 in damages and later increasing the claim to R1 million. As part of these proceedings, Lifman also obtained a draft court order to attach Jorberg's Green Point property.

Lifman was assassinated in George, Western Cape, on 3 November 2024, just one day before he was scheduled to appear in the Western Cape High Court as a co-accused in the 2017 murder case of Brian Wainstein, a crime figure known as the "Steroid King." Lifman’s death is expected to have significant implications for organized crime in South Africa, with some experts suggesting it could disrupt established criminal networks in the region.

== See also ==
- Beer in South Africa
- Beer in Africa
- Beer sommelier
- Food pairing
