= Mvelaphanda Group =

Mvelaphanda Group (JSE: MVG) is a company in South Africa, listed on the Johannesburg Stock Exchange (JSE), that was founded by Tokyo Sexwale, a compatriot of Nelson Mandela. The group was formed in 2003/4 by the merger of Mvelaphanda Holdings and Rebserve. Mvelaphanda Holdings is active in the fields of financial services, healthcare, mining, general industry and real property.

Mvela Holdings is the controlling shareholder of Mvelaphanda Group Ltd and has a significant interest in JSE-listed Mvelaphanda Resources Ltd. It has other substantial privately held interests in the mining, energy, real estate and various other industrial sectors in South Africa and Africa. The chief executive of the company is Mark Willcox. In January 2012, Mvelaphanda Holdings, OZ Management (a subsidiary of Och-Ziff Capital Management Group) and Palladino Holdings announced the creation of a joint venture called Africa Management Limited, which will also see the creation of African Global Capital, a platform through which to invest in public and private markets across Africa. This platform will focus primarily on natural resources.

== Controversy ==
Mvelaphanda has been the subject of scrutiny due to its involvement with Palladino Holdings in a USD25 million loan to start up a state mining company. The terms of the loan stated that in the event of default, the lender could receive payment in kind to the value of the loan, up to 30% in state mining assets.
