= Satoshi Mitazono =

Japanese politician and journalist

- 三反園 訓
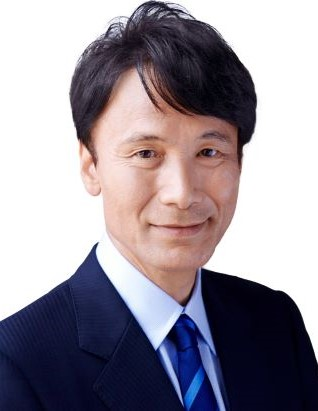
- Official portrait, c. 2025

Member of the House of Representatives
- Incumbent
- Assumed office 3 November 2021
- Preceded by: Masuo Kaneko
- Constituency: Kagoshima 2nd

Governor of Kagoshima Prefecture
- In office 28 July 2016 – 27 July 2020
- Monarchs: Akihito; Naruhito
- Preceded by: Yūichirō Itō
- Succeeded by: Kōichi Shiota

Personal details
- Born: 13 February 1958 (age 68) Ibusuki, Kagoshima, Japan
- Party: Liberal Democratic
- Other political affiliations: Independent (2016–2025)
- Education: Waseda University
- Profession: Journalist
- Website: Official website

Satoshi Mitazono (三反園 訓, Mitazono Satoshi; born 13 February 1958) is a Japanese politician and journalist who is the former governor of Kagoshima Prefecture. He defeated the incumbent Yūichirō Itō at an election held on 10 July 2016.

== Early life and education ==
Mitazono was born in Ibusuki, Kagoshima in 1958. In 1980 he graduated from Waseda University with a bachelor's degree in education and was employed by TV Asahi as a political journalist.

== Journalistic career ==
During his career with TV Asahi, Mitazono was responsible for reporting on national politics. From 1990 he was the political reporter for News Station, Asahi's daily night-time news program. In 2004 he was employed as a part-time lecturer at Waseda University's Graduate School of Public Management.

== Political career ==
On 31 December 2015 Mitazono announced his intention to run in the July 2016 Kagoshima gubernatorial election as an independent candidate. During a press conference in front of the prefectural government's building, he stated that the gap between regions was widening and that he wanted to revolutionise and bring life to Kagoshima, with ideas to expand the role of women. He also expressed hope that the incumbent governor Yūichirō Itō would "pass the baton", stating that 12 years in office was one chapter. However, Itō had already expressed his intention to seek a fourth four-year term in office at a prefectural assembly session earlier in the same month. Mitazono officially declared his candidacy in February 2016 and the pair were the only two candidates when the election was formally announced in June.

Mitazono was considered a "conservative independent" candidate, and received official endorsement from the Democratic and Social Democratic parties. He also received support from conservative local assembly members and former prefectural assembly members, despite the conservative Liberal Democratic and Komeito parties officially endorsing Itō.

During the campaign, the biggest issue was whether the 12-year governorship of Itō should continue, or whether it was time for change in Kagoshima. Another point of difference was the candidates' position on nuclear power; in August 2015 the Sendai Nuclear Power Plant in Satsumasendai, Kagoshima was the first nuclear plant in Japan to restart following the March 2011 Fukushima disaster and the only one in operation at the time of the election. Itō accepted the national agency's position to allow the plant to operate for up to 60 years from the date the reactors were commissioned. Conversely, Mitazono called for the plant to be shut down and its safety further investigated.

In the election held on 10 July 2016, Mitazono received 55.5% of the vote, defeating Itō by a margin of more than 84,000 votes. In Satsumasendai, the location of the operating nuclear plants, Miatzono received 23,176 votes, just seven more than Itō. Mitazono took office on 28 July 2016 and stated at a press conference on his first day that he would seek the suspension of operation at the Sendai Nuclear Power Plant as early as the following month. He submitted a suspension request to Kyushu Electric Power on 26 August; the company rejected the request on 5 September on the grounds that the reactors are scheduled to undergo periodic inspection later in the year. Mitazono responded by visiting the company's headquarters in Fukuoka to submit a second request two days later.

In the 2020 Kagoshima gubernatorial elections, Mitazono lost to independent candidate Kōichi Shiota.

In the 2021 general elections, Mitazono ran as an independent candidate in the Kagoshima 2nd district and won a seat in the House of Representatives.
