= Frederic Rzewski =

American composer and pianist (1938–2021)

- Born: Frederic Anthony Rzewski; April 13, 1938; Westfield, Massachusetts, U.S.
- Died: June 26, 2021 (aged 83); Montiano, Italy
- Education: Phillips Academy; Harvard University; Princeton University
- Occupations: Composer; Pianist; Academic teacher
- Organizations: Musica Elettronica Viva; Conservatoire Royal de Musique in Liège
- Known for: Coming Together; The People United Will Never Be Defeated!
- Notable work: List of compositions

Frederic Anthony Rzewski (/ˈʒɛfski/ ZHEF-skee; April 13, 1938 – June 26, 2021) was an American composer and pianist. He was considered to be one of the most important American composer-pianists of his time. From 1977 on, he lived primarily in Belgium. His major compositions, which often incorporate social and political themes, include the minimalist Coming Together and the theme and variations set The People United Will Never Be Defeated!, which has been called "a modern classic".

== Early life and education ==
Rzewski was born on April 13, 1938, in Westfield, Massachusetts, to Polish-American parents, and raised Catholic. He began playing piano at age 5 and attended Phillips Academy, Harvard University, and Princeton University, where his teachers included Randall Thompson, Roger Sessions, Walter Piston, and Milton Babbitt. In 1960, he went to Italy on a Fulbright grant, a trip which was formative in his future musical development. In addition to studying composition with Luigi Dallapiccola in Florence, he began a career as a performer of new piano music, often with an improvisatory element.

== Career ==
In 1966, Rzewski co-founded Musica Elettronica Viva with fellow American expatriates Alvin Curran and Richard Teitelbaum in Rome. Musica Elettronica Viva conceived music as a collective, collaborative process, with improvisation and live electronics prominently featured. In 1971, he returned to New York from Italy.

In 1977, Rzewski became Professor of Composition at the Royal Conservatory of Liège in Belgium, then directed by Henri Pousseur. He taught for short periods at other schools and universities throughout the US and Europe, including Yale University, the University of Cincinnati, the California Institute of the Arts, the University of California, San Diego, the Royal Conservatory of The Hague, and Trinity College of Music in London.

Many of Rzewski's works were inspired by secular and socio-historical themes, show a deep political conscience, and feature improvisational elements. His better-known works include The People United Will Never Be Defeated! (36 variations on Sergio Ortega's "El pueblo unido jamás será vencido" for piano); Coming Together, a setting of letters from Sam Melville, an inmate at Attica State Prison prior to the Attica Prison riot; North American Ballads (1978–79); Night Crossing with Fisherman; Fougues; Fantasia and Sonata; The Price of Oil and Le Silence des Espaces Infinis, both of which use graphical notation; Les Moutons de Panurge; and the Antigone-Legend. Rzewski's later compositions include Nanosonatas (2006–2010) and Cadenza con o senza Beethoven (2003). Rzewski played the solo part in the world premiere of his piano concerto at the 2013 BBC Proms.

== Personal life and death ==
In 1963, Rzewski married Nicole Abbeloos; they had five children. While Rzewski never divorced Abbeloos, his companion for about the last 20 years of his life was Françoise Walot, with whom he had two children. He also had five grandchildren.

Rzewski died of an apparent heart attack in Montiano, Tuscany, Italy, on June 26, 2021, aged 83.

== Appraisal ==
Nicolas Slonimsky called Rzewski "a granitically overpowering piano technician, capable of depositing huge boulders of sonoristic material across the keyboard without actually wrecking the instrument." In 2018, Michael Schell deemed him "the most important living composer of piano music, and surely one of the dozen or so most important living American composers".

In Christgau's Record Guide: Rock Albums of the Seventies (1981), music critic and journalist Robert Christgau called the premiere recording of Coming Together "amazing" and "political art as expressive and accessible as Guernica".

== Selected discography ==
=== As composer ===
- A Mensch, played by Daan Vandewalle (Passacaille Records, PAS 9707), 2026
- Four North American Ballads, played by Paul Jacobs (Nonesuch Records on Paul Jacobs Plays Blues, Ballads & Rags D-79006 (LP) & 79006-2 (CD re-issue ) 1980(LP) 1993 (CD)
- Four Pieces, Hard Cuts and The Housewife's Lament played by Ralph van Raat et al. (Naxos 8.559759) 2014
- The People United Will Never Be Defeated! and Winnsboro Cotton Mill Blues played by Michael Noble on American Dissident (198004840682) 2022.
- The People United Will Never Be Defeated!, played by Stephen Drury (New Albion NA 063) 1994
- The People United Will Never Be Defeated!, played by Marc-André Hamelin (Hyperion Records CDA67077) 1998
- The People United Will Never Be Defeated!, played by Corey Hamm (Redshift Records TK431) 2014
- The People United Will Never be Defeated!, played by Daan Vandewalle (Passacaille Records, PAS 9708), 2027
- De Profundis, 4 North American Ballads, played by Lisa Moore (Cantaloupe Music 21014) 2003
- Main Drag played by Alter Ego (Stradivarius STR33631SD) 2003
- Nanosonatas, played by Daan Vandewalle (Passacaille Records, PAS 9706), 2025
- Fred – Music of Frederic Rzewski played by Eighth Blackbird (Cedille CDR90000-084) 2005
- Rzewski & Adams: Piano Works played by Emanuele Arciuli (Stradivarius STR33735) 2006
- The People United Will Never Be Defeated!, played by Ralph van Raat (Naxos 8.559360) 2008
- The People United Will Never Be Defeated!, played by Christopher Hinterhuber (Paladino PMR0037) 2012
- The People United Will Never Be Defeated! and Four Hands played by Ursula Oppens and Jerome Lowenthal (Cedille CDR90000-158) 2015
- The People United Will Never Be Defeated!, played by Igor Levit on Igor Levit plays Bach, Beethoven, Rzewski (Sony Classical 88875060962) 2015
- Speaking Rzewski, played by Stephane Ginsburgh on (Sub Rosa SR523) 2021.
- Songs of Insurrection, played by Thomas Kotcheff (Coviello Contemporary COV 92021) 2020
- Songs of Insurrection, played by Daan Vandewalle (Passacaille Records, PAS 9708), 2027
- Sometimes, played by Imani Winds on Bruits (Bright Shiny Things). 2021.
- The Road, played by Daan Vandewalle (Passacaille Records, PAS 9704), 2025
- The Turtle and the Crane, played by Christina Petrowska-Quilico on Vintage Americana (Navona Records NAV6384) 2021.
- Winnsboro Cotton Mill Blues, played by Christina Petrowska-Quilico on Retro Americana (Navona Records NAV6361) 2021.

=== As pianist ===
- Anthony Braxton – Creative Orchestra Music 1976 (Arista, 1976)
- Anthony Braxton – For Two Pianos (Arista, 1980 [1982])
- Marc-Henri Cykiert — Capriccio Hassidico (Igloo Records IGL095) 1991
- Cornelius Cardew – We Sing For The Future! 2001
- Tom Johnson – An Hour for Piano (1985)
- Henri Pousseur – Aquarius-Memorial (2001)
- Henri Pousseur – La Guirlande de Pierre (1995)
- Karlheinz Stockhausen – Kontra-Punkte (RCA Victrola, 1967)
- Karlheinz Stockhausen – Klavierstück X (Wergo) 2014 CD re-issue
- Rzewski Plays Rzewski: Piano Works 1975–1999 (7-CD box set, Nonesuch, 2002)

== Literature ==
- Rzewski, Frederic. Nonsequiturs—Writings & Lectures on Improvisation, Composition, and Interpretation (Unlogische Folgerungen—Schriften und Vorträge zu Improvisation, Komposition und Interpretation). Edition Musiktexte, Cologne, 2007. ISBN 3-9803151-8-5.
- Петров, Владислав Олегович. Фредерик Ржевски: путь обновления традиций. Astrakhan: AIPKP, 2011, p. 100.
- Petrov, Vladislav O. Frederic Rzewski: upgrade path traditions. Astrakhan: AIPKP, 2011, p. 100.
