= Palatine (disambiguation) =

A palatine (palatine guard) was a high-level official attached to imperial or royal courts in Europe since Roman times.

Palatine may also refer to:

== Personal titles ==
- Palatine (Kingdom of Hungary), vice-regent of Hungary
- Count palatine, vice-regal office-bearers in Germany
- Voivode or Count palatine, a governor in Poland
- The holder of a county palatine, northern counties/duchies in England

== Places ==
- Palatine, County Carlow, Ireland, a hamlet
- Palatine Hill, one of the seven hills of Rome
- Palatine Township, Cook County, Illinois, near Chicago
  - Palatine, Illinois, a village predominantly in Palatine Township
- Palatine, New York, a town in New York State
  - Palatine Bridge, New York, a village inside this town

== People ==
- Palatines, people from the Palatinates of the Holy Roman Empire
- Guy Palatin (born 2000), Israeli basketball player

== Biology ==
- Palatine bone, a bone in the palate
- The palatine tonsils in the back of the throat

== Entertainment and media ==
- Palatine, a four-CD compilation of Factory Records artists
- Palantine, the fictional political candidate with whom Travis Bickle tries to build a relationship with, in Taxi Driver (1976)
- Palatine, an elite caste of Xenomorphs from the Alien series

== Transportation ==
- The Palatine, a 1938 London train
- Northern Counties Palatine, a step-entrance double-decker bus
- Palatine Light, mythical ghost ship based on the historic shipwreck Princess Augusta
- Palatine station, a commuter rail station in Palatine, Illinois

== Other uses ==
- Palatine GAA club, a Gaelic football club in County Carlow, Ireland

== See also ==
- Electoral Palatinate
- Palatinate (disambiguation)
- Palatino (disambiguation)
- Paladin (disambiguation)
- Rhineland-Palatinate, one of the States of the Federal Republic of Germany
- Palatinus (Roman Catholic Church), certain high officials of the papal court
