= Kōichi Shiota =

Japanese politician serving as governor of Kagoshima province

- 塩田 康一

Governor of Kagoshima Prefecture
- Incumbent
- Assumed office 28 July 2020
- Monarch: Naruhito
- Preceded by: Satoshi Mitazono

Personal details
- Born: 15 October 1965 (age 61) Kagoshima, Japan
- Party: Independent
- Education: Japanese La Salle Academy; University of Tokyo
- Website: 塩田康一

Kōichi Shiota (塩田 康一, Shiota Kōichi; born 15 October 1965) is a Japanese politician currently serving as the governor of Kagoshima Prefecture.

== Political career ==
Shiota served in the industrial ministry for around 30 years before running as governor in the 2020 Kagoshima gubernatorial elections. His campaign focused heavily on revitalizing the local economy, emphasizing on his previous political experience.

He ran as an independent without the endorsement of any major party. He gained support using grassroots tactics, visiting local companies and farmers. He beat incumbent governor Satoshi Mitazono in the elections, assuming office on 28 July 2020. Shiota was re-elected for a second term in July 2024.
