= Nanosonatas =

Nanosonatas (2006–2010) are piano compositions by American composer Frederic Rzewski.

== History ==
In the summer of 2006, Rzewski’s friend Hideyuki Arata, a Japanese scientist specialized in nanotechnology, sent him an article of three pages, that he had published in Applied Physics Letters. The scientist happened to be an amateur pianist, so in return Rzewski decided to dedicate “Nanosonata” to him. Like the article, this first Nanosonata was written in three pages (about two minutes long) and, as the composer said, was technically somewhat demanding, but would not require the scientist to practice too much. Around the same time, Rzewski also had a commission from Milton Schlosser in Edmonton, Alberta. The composer liked the first Nanosonata, so he decided to write more - for Schlosser and others - and get them together into books. Eventually, the first “Nanosonata” became “Nanosonata Book I, No 1”. Rzewski has composed 56 Nanosonatas, most dedicated to his family and friends, such as Elliott Carter and Pete Seeger.

== Constructs ==
- Book I（2006）
  - Nanosonata No. 1 (To Hideyuki Arata)
  - Nanosonata No. 2~7 (To Milton Schlosser)
- Book II
  - Nanosonata No. 8~14 (To Igor Levit)
- Book III（2007-2009）
  - Nanosonata No. 15~21
- Book IV - Peace Dances (Commissioned by Robert Bielecki)
  - Nanosonata No. 22~27 (To Sarah Cahill）
  - Nanosonata No. 28 “It can be done!” (November 12. 2008) (To Elliott Carter and Pete Seeger)
- Book V
  - Nanosonata No. 29~35
- Book VI
  - Nanosonata No. 36 “To a Young Man” (To Noam Rzewski)
  - Nanosonata No. 37 “To a Young Woman” (To Noemi)
  - Nanosonata No. 38 “To a great Guy” (To Jan)
  - Nanosonata No. 39 “To a Runner” (To Alexis)
  - Nanosonata No. 40 “To a Dead Infant” (To Nicolas)
  - Nanosonata No. 41 “To a Sweet Guy”
  - Nanosonata No. 42 “To a Girl” (To Esther Rzewski)
- Book VII
  - Nanosonata No. 43~49 (To Annette Morreau)
- Book VIII
  - Nanosonata No. 50~56 (August 22. 2010) (Commande du Festival d’Automne a Paris 2010)
- Arrangements
  - Nanosonata No. 12 arranged for violin and piano, 2008
