= Yuichiro Ando =

American painter

Yuichiro Ando (born 1959) is a Japanese-American painter, video artist, and documentary film maker. He was born in Tokyo, Japan.

== Life ==
Ando moved to the U.S. in 1980. He studied at the Otis Art Institute of Parsons School of Design where he earned his BFA. He also attended graduate school at UC Irvine School of Fine Arts and received his MFA. He has received several awards since.

In 1997 Ando worked on a major documentary project on hemophiliacs and HIV. The documentary he produced resulted in a $100 million lawsuit by pharmaceutical companies. This event led him to quit producing documentaries and he concentrated on his artworks.
