= Takeshi Tokuda =

Japanese politician

- 徳田 毅
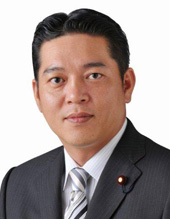

Member of the House of Representatives
- In office 11 September 2005 – 28 February 2014
- Preceded by: Torao Tokuda
- Succeeded by: Masuo Kaneko
- Constituency: Kagoshima 2nd

Personal details
- Born: 30 May 1971 (age 55) Naze, Kagoshima, Japan
- Party: Independent
- Other political affiliations: Liberal Democratic
- Parent: Torao Tokuda (father)
- Education: University of California, Los Angeles; Harvard University; Teikyo University

Takeshi Tokuda (徳田 毅, Tokuda Takeshi; born 30 May 1971) is a former Japanese politician who served in the House of Representatives in the Diet (national legislature) as an independent.

== Early life ==
A native of Yao, Osaka, Tokita attended University of California, Los Angeles and summer school at Harvard University in the United States. He entered Teikyo University in April 2005.

== Family ==
His father Torao Tokuda was also a politician, as well as head of the Tokushukai hospital group.

== Political career ==
Tokuda was elected for the first time in 2005.

=== Rape scandal and resignation ===
In February 2013, he resigned from his Diet post as parliamentary secretary in charge of infrastructure and transport as well as reconstruction, after tabloid Shūkan Shinchō ran a story alleging he had raped an intoxicated 19-year-old, and then when the victim filed a civil suit against him for damages came to an out-of-court settlement with her for ¥10 million. In public comments, Tokuda apologised for causing trouble but refused comment on the issue, stating that he had agreed not to discuss it. On February 24, 2014, he submitted his resignation from the Diet due to guilt-by-association rules of the Public Offices Election Law.

House of Representatives (Japan)
Preceded by Torao Tokuda	Member of the House of Representatives from Kagoshima 2nd district 2005–2014	Succeeded by Masuo Kaneko
