= Liberal League (Japan) =

Liberal League 自由連合
- President: Takeshi Tokuda
- Secretary general: Ichiji Ishii
- Founded: 1994
- Dissolved: 2007
- Ideology: Classical liberalism Liberal conservatism

Website
- www.jiyuren.or.jp

The Liberal League; Japanese Jiyu Rengo (自由連合); was a liberal party in Japan. It was a minor party which held one seat in the House of Representatives in the Diet at its peak. The League, whose name can also be translated as "Freedom League" or "Libertarian Union" (even though its official English translation is Liberal League), had a liberal and free market political agenda.

The party was formed in 1994 and won a few seats in its first election; however, in the 2003 parliamentary elections, it won only one. It won no seats in the July 2004 Upper House Elections.

On domestic policy, the party supported privatization and smaller government, but also called for increasing the rights of women. It supported the government on most issues, and, despite being critical of Japan's close relationship with the United States, was supportive of the war in Iraq. It gained its base mostly from farmers. It supported the government (made up of the Liberal Democratic Party and New Kōmeitō) on most issues unofficially.

On domestic policy, the party was a liberal party.

In the 2005 lower house elections, the Liberal League's only sitting member of parliament declined to run for reelection. The party disbanded shortly afterwards.

== See also ==
- Liberalism
- Contributions to liberal theory
- Liberalism worldwide
- List of liberal parties
- Liberal democracy
- List of political parties in Japan
- Politics of Japan
