= Palatino (disambiguation) =

Palatino is a family of typefaces.

Palatino may also refer to:

- Palatino Express, a passenger train, formerly called the Rome Express, operating from 1890
- Palatine Hill, also called Palatino, the centermost of the Seven Hills of Rome

== People with the surname ==
- Giovanni Battista Palatino (c. 1515 – c. 1575), Italian calligrapher
- Raymond Palatino (born 1979), Filipino activist

== See also ==
- Palatine (disambiguation)
