= Jean-Louis Viovy =

French physicist and polymer scientist

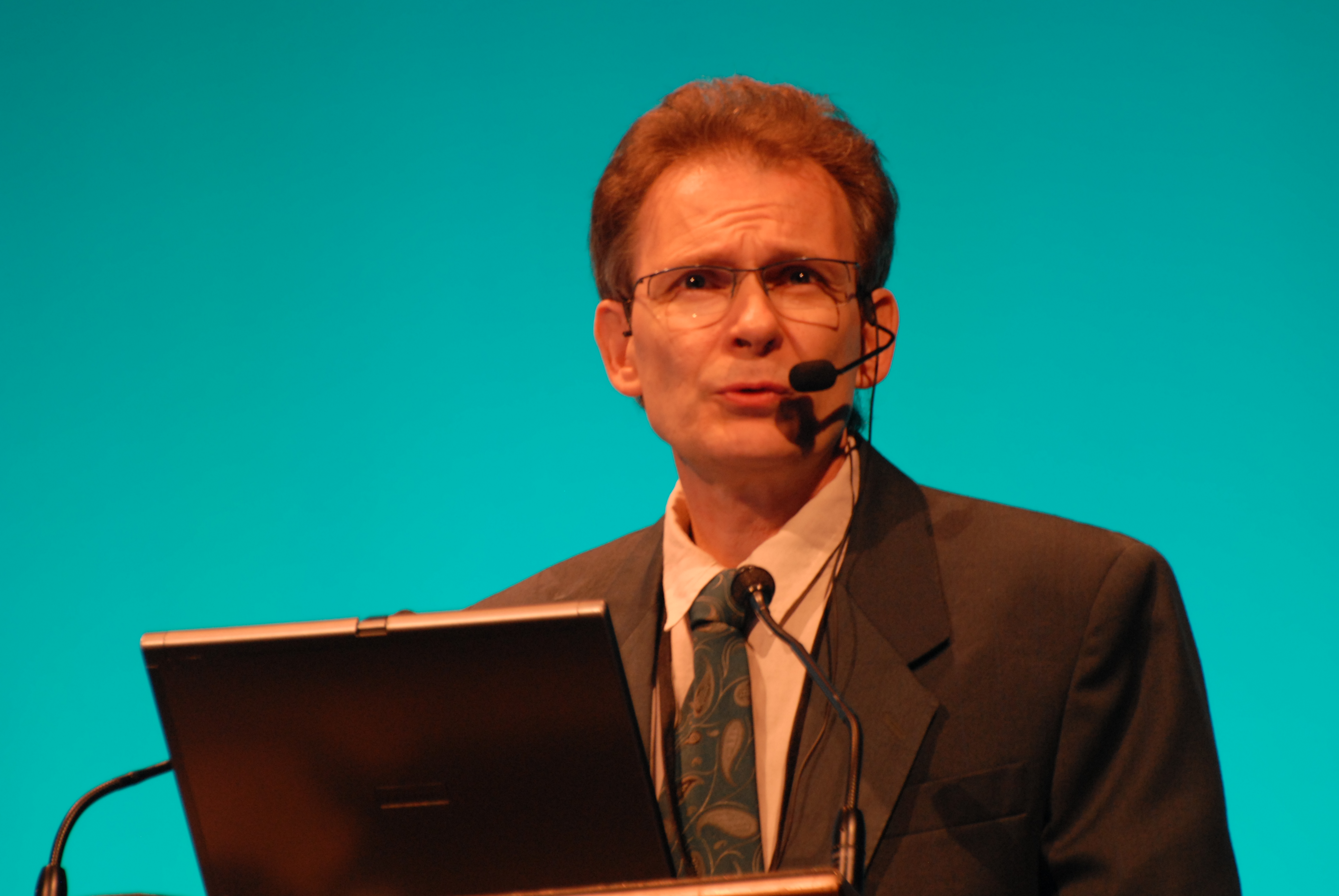
Jean-Louis Viovy, MicroTAS 2007.

Jean Louis Viovy is a French physicist and polymer scientist and currently a researcher at CNRS (France). Since 1999, he leads within the Curie Institute (Paris) the MMBM team (Macromolecules and Microsystems in Biology and Medicine) dedicated to research on lab-on-chips, bioanalytical methods and translational medicine. He holds a Ph.D. from the Pierre and Marie Curie University (also known as Sorbonne - Paris VI). He was awarded the Bronze Medal of the CNRS (1983), the Polymer Prize of the French Chemical Society (1996), the Philip Morris Scientific Prize in 1996 and two OSEO Entrepreneurship Awards in 2004 and 2005.

== Works ==
He is author or co-author of more than 180 articles and 20 patents and is a member of the board of the Chemical and Biological Microsystems Society and of the Editorial Board of «Biomicrofluidics». He is cofounder and member of the scientific advisory board of the French company Fluigent. He is also a cofounder of the Institut Pierre-Gilles de Gennes for Microfluidics (IPGG).
