= Sendai Nuclear Power Plant =

Nuclear power plant in Satsumasendai, Kagoshima Prefecture, Japan

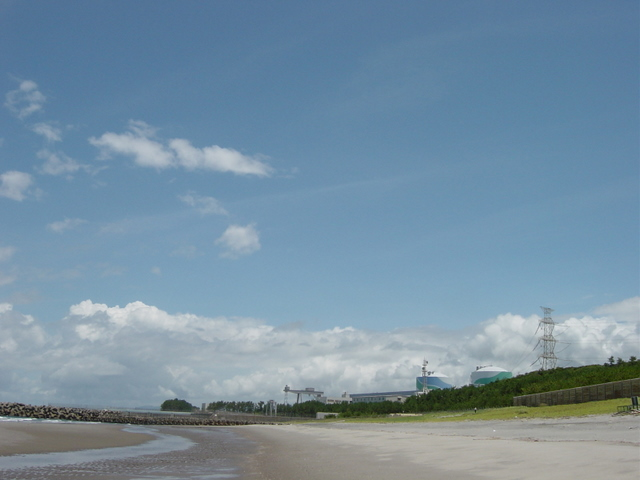
- The Sendai NPP, July 2004
- Country: Japan
- Coordinates: 31°50′01″N 130°11′23″E
- Status: Operational
- Construction began: December 15, 1979
- Commission date: July 4, 1984
- Operator: Kyūshū Electric Power Company

Nuclear power station
- Reactor type: PWR
- Reactor supplier: MHI
- Cooling source: East China Sea

Power generation
- Units operational: 2 x 890 MW
- Nameplate capacity: 1780 MW
- Capacity factor: 79.7%
- Annual net output: 12427 GW·h

External links
- Website: www1.kyuden.co.jp/sendai_index
- Commons: Related media on Commons

The Sendai Nuclear Power Plant (Japanese: 川内原子力発電所, Hepburn: Sendai Genshiryoku Hatsudensho; Sendai NPP) is a nuclear power plant located in the city of Satsumasendai in Kagoshima Prefecture. The two 846 MW net reactors are owned and operated by the Kyūshū Electric Power Company. The plant, like all other nuclear power plants in Japan, did not generate electricity after the nationwide shutdown in the wake of the Fukushima Daiichi nuclear disaster in 2011, but was restarted on August 11, 2015, and began providing power to nearby towns again. Sendai is the first of Japan's nuclear power plants to be restarted.

The plant is on a site of 1.45 km^{2} (358 acres), employs 277 workers, and indirectly employs 790.

The reactors are of the 3-loop M type pressurized water reactor, built by Mitsubishi Heavy Industries.

== Reactors on Site ==
Sendai has two nuclear reactors, Sendai-1 and Sendai-2. Both are pressurized water reactors that make 890 MW of power with a core tonnage of 72 tons of uranium dioxide. Sendai-1 was commissioned on July 4, 1984, at a cost of 278.7 billion yen, and Sendai-2 was commissioned on November 28, 1985, at a cost of 228.7 billion yen.

== Stress-tests published in 2011-restart crises ==
On 14 December 2011 the Kyushu Electric Power Company published the outcome of the primary safety assessments or "stress-tests" for three of its suspended nuclear reactors: two of them located at the Sendai Nuclear Power Plant in Kagoshima Prefecture, the third at was located the Genkai Nuclear Power Plant in Saga Prefecture. The reports were sent to the Japanese Nuclear and Industrial Safety Agency. The papers were also sent to the local authorities of the prefectures where the plants were located, because the reactors are not allowed to be restarted without their consent. According to the test, the reactors could withstand a seismic shock of 945 to 1,020 gals and tsunami-waves of a height of 13 to 15 meters. The power company asked its customers to reduce their power-consumption by at least 5% after 26 December, because at 25 December the number 4 reactor in Genkai would be taken out of operation for regular check-ups. Nuclear power generation did account for about 40 percent of the total output of the company, according to company official Akira Nakamura. He said that restarting reactors was crucial for them, and that the company will do all it can do to win back public-trust. However, Hideo Kishimoto, the mayor of Genkai said that it would be difficult to resume operations. He asked Kyushu Electric to disclose their practices in full, besides their efforts to prevent future accidents.

== Draft safety test report 2013–2014 ==
According to a Special Bulletin issued on July 17, 2014 by The Institute of Energy Economics, Japan, in June 2013 the Japanese Nuclear Regulation Authority (NRA) created new stricter safety standards for all Japanese nuclear power plants. Tests on 19 reactors at 12 nuclear power plants based on the new standards began the following month and were expected to take six months, but took longer on account of their strictness.

The two-reactor Sendai plant was given priority and was approved by the NRA as meeting both its earthquake and tsunami assumptions in March 2014. An effective safety test pass certificate was issued on July 16 and the draft safety test report was opened to public comments until August 15.

The basis for the approval was enhanced safety measures, in particular raising the previous assumption for the Sendai plant of 540 gal for maximum earthquake strength to 620 gal, and similarly the assumption of maximum tsunami height from 4 meters to 5 meters. Furthermore, a 10-meter-high protection wall was built. Design standards were further enhanced to take into account all other natural disasters, in particular volcanic eruptions and tornadoes, along with plans to address terrorist attacks. Further details on the tests may be found in the Special Bulletin.

== Restarting ==
On 10 September 2014 the NRA declared that the plant was safe to be operated. Actual operation was originally expected by the end of 2014, following approval of local authorities, however, local and national groups and NGOS opposed the planned restart of the Sendai nuclear plants. John Large of the London-based consulting Engineers Large & Associates, provided opinion and evidence in an ongoing civil action in Japan contesting the restart of the Sendai Nuclear Power Plant and separately Large & Associates prepared an assessment of the effectiveness of the Japanese NRA recently introduced guide for the evaluation of nuclear power plant sites with respect to the potential effects of volcanic activity, specifically aligning this to the Sendai NPP presently proposed for restart following a four-year shut down in the aftermath of Fukushima Daiichi.

In April 2015, a Japanese court rejected a complaint against the restart. On May 28, 2015, The Nuclear Regulation Authority approved the station's emergency plans, which was the last regulatory hurdle remaining before restarts could happen. Owner Kyushu Electric Power Company then had all approvals necessary for restart. On July 7, 2015, fuel loading of Sendai unit #1 began. The NRA completed its pre-operational examinations and gave Kyushu Electric Company the green light to place fuel inside the reactor vessel.

Sendai's reactor no. 1 was restarted on August 11, 2015. Naoto Kan, former Prime Minister (2010–2011), was among the protesters who were demonstrating in front of the Sendai plant when the reactor was restarted.

On November 1, 2015, followed reactor n.2, at full-capacity the same day, with its thermal output reaching the maximum level, about two weeks after it was reactivated. No major problems occurred in the process. The utility first restarted reactor n.2, removing the control rods on October, 15.

The unit 1 was shut down for maintenance from October to December 2016; Kagoshima governor Satoshi Mitazono approved the restarting of the reactor despite his personal opposition to nuclear power.

On 7 January 2017 unit 1 resumed commercial operation.

In March 2019, the Nuclear Regulation Authority (NRA) announced it would install seabed sensors to monitor the Aira Caldera 40 km from the nuclear plant, to supplement land-based monitoring. In the extremely unlikely event of signs of major volcanic activity, it would be possible to remove nuclear fuel from the reactors.

== 2020 shutdown and restart ==
In March 2020, reactor #1 was shut down again because it could not meet the deadline for anti-terrorism safety measures. It was the first time a reactor was shut down for this reason in Japan. After the required work was completed, the reactor was restarted in November 2020.

Reactor #2 was shut down for the same reason in May 2020; it is expected to be restarted in January 2021 after installing anti-terrorism safety measures and completing maintenance.

== See also ==
- List of nuclear power plants in Japan
