= Mark Lifman =

South African criminal (1965–2024)

Mark Lifman (1965 – 3 November 2024) was a South African businessman associated with organized crime in Cape Town.

Known for his involvement in nightclub security and alleged protection rackets, Lifman faced multiple serious charges over the years, including murder, attempted murder, money laundering, gang-related offences, and tax evasion. He was a suspect in the 2017 murder case of Brian Wainstein, a steroid dealer known as the "Steroid King", for which he was out on bail and due to appear in court on 4 November 2024. On 3 November Lifman was assassinated in a hail of bullets outside the Garden Route Mall in George, Western Cape. His death has raised concerns about potential impacts on Cape Town's organized crime networks.

== Business ventures and allegations ==
Lifman's business activities centered around real estate and nightlife sectors in Cape Town. While he maintained that his enterprises were legitimate, his name frequently surfaced in connection with alleged protection rackets in the area. Reports indicate that Lifman and associates allegedly sought payments from nightclub and restaurant owners for security services, though these activities have not been confirmed in court.

== Legal issues ==
In 2024, Lifman filed a defamation lawsuit against Randolf Jorberg, the owner of Beerhouse, following comments Jorberg made after the closure of his business. Jorberg's statements suggested Lifman's involvement in violent crime, including the 2015 murder of Beerhouse employee Joe-Louis Kanyona. Lifman initially sought R500,000 in damages, later raising the amount to R1 million, and moved to attach Jorberg's property as part of the case.

Lifman was also named as a co-accused in the 2017 murder of Brian Wainstein, a known steroid dealer. He was out on bail for this charge and was scheduled to appear in court on 4 November 2024, the day after his assassination.

== Assassination ==
On 3 November 2024, Lifman was shot and killed outside the Garden Route Mall in George, Western Cape. His death has been described as a targeted assassination, and police have arrested two suspects, both with connections to Cape Town-based security and protection, including a former member of the South African Police Service's Special Task Force. The suspects appeared in the George Magistrate's Court on 5 November 2024, facing charges of premeditated murder. The case was postponed to 13 November 2024.

It has been stated that there was a R10 million bounty on Lifman's life.
