= Palladino =

Palladino is an Italian surname. Notable people with the surname include:

- Adriano Palladino (1610–1680), Italian painter of the Baroque era
- Aleksa Palladino (born 1980), American actress and singer
- Amy Sherman-Palladino (born 1966), American television writer and producer
- Daniel Palladino, American television writer and producer
- Eddie Palladino (born 1958), American basketball announcer for the Boston Celtics
- Emma Palladino (1861–1922), Italian ballerina
- Erik Palladino (born 1968), American actor
- Eusapia Palladino (1854–1918), Italian spiritualist and medium
- Jack Palladino (1944–2021), American private investigator hired by the Bill Clinton presidential election committee
- Leandro Palladino (born 1976), Argentine–Italian basketball player
- Pino Palladino (born 1957), Welsh bassist and record producer
- Raffaele Palladino (born 1984), Italian football player
- Robert Palladino (1932–2016), American academic
- Tony Palladino (cricketer) (born 1983), English cricketer
- Tony Palladino (1930–2014), American graphic designer

== See also ==
- Paladino (disambiguation)
