= Joe Paladino =

English footballer, football coach, and boxer

Personal information
- Full name: Giuseppe Paladino
- Date of birth: 29 August 1965 (age 61)
- Position: Goalkeeper

Senior career*
Years	Team	Apps	(Gls)
- Rossendale United
- St Helens Town
1990–1991	Wigan Athletic	7	(0)
- Runcorn
- Witton Albion
- Altrincham

Managerial career
- 2002: Daisy Hill
- 2004–2005: St Helens Town
- 2011: Congleton Town
- * Club domestic league appearances and goals

Giuseppe "Joe" Paladino (born 29 August 1965) is an English football coach and former professional player. He is the Goalkeeping Coach of New Mills.

Paladino also enjoyed a career as a professional boxer.

== Football career ==
=== Playing career ===
Paladino, who played as a goalkeeper, started his career in non-league football with Rossendale United and St Helens Town. He signed for Wigan Athletic in December 1990, making seven appearances in the Football League for the team during the 1990–91 season. He returned to non-league football the following season with Runcorn, and went on to play for Witton Albion, where he was part of the squad that reached the final of the FA Trophy, and Altrincham.

=== Coaching career ===
Paladino took charge of Daisy Hill in February 2002.

Paladino later took charge of St Helens Town in January 2004, before quitting in March 2005.

After working as a goalkeeping coach at FC United of Manchester, he was appointed Assistant Manager of Rossendale United in March 2010. He was manager of Congleton Town in 2011.

== Boxing career ==
Paladino was also a professional boxer. He retired in 1997 before returning as an amateur in 2006.
