= Yūichirō Itō =

Japanese politician

- 伊藤 祐一郎

Governor of Kagoshima Prefecture
- In office 28 July 2004 – 27 July 2016
- Monarch: Akihito
- Preceded by: Tatsurō Suga
- Succeeded by: Satoshi Mitazono

Personal details
- Born: 17 November 1947 (age 78) Izumi, Kagoshima, Japan
- Party: Independent
- Education: University of Tokyo

Yūichirō Itō (伊藤 祐一郎, Itō Yūichirō; born 17 November 1947) is a Japanese politician and former governor of Kagoshima Prefecture in Japan. A native of Izumi, Kagoshima and graduate of the University of Tokyo with the Bachelor of Laws in June 1971, he had worked at the Ministry of Home Affairs since 1972 before elected governor.

He served three terms as governor from 2004 until 2016. In July 2016 he sought a fourth term but was defeated by Satoshi Mitazono.

Preceded by Tatsurō Suga	Governors of Kagoshima Prefecture; 2004–2016	Succeeded by Satoshi Mitazono
