= Arriba en la Cordillera =

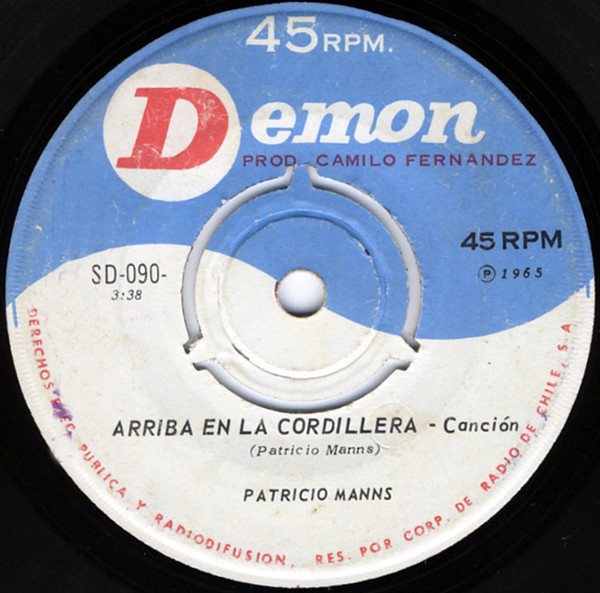
- 7" single label (1965)

Single by Patricio Manns

from the album Entre Mar y Cordillera
- Language: Spanish
- B-side: "Ya no Canto tu Nombre"
- Released: 1965
- Genre: Nueva Canción Chilenafolk-pop
- Length: 3:41 (Original Version); 3:38 (1999 Version)
- Label: Demon
- Songwriter: Patricio Manns
- Producer: Camilo Fernández

Patricio Manns singles chronology
"Los Mares Vacios" (1965)	"Arriba en la Cordillera" (1965)	"Beso de Espino" (1966)

"Arriba en la Cordillera" (translanted: "Up in the Mountain Range") is a song by the Chilean singer-songwriter Patricio Manns released as single in 1965 and included in the 1966 studio album Entre Mar y Cordillera. It reached #1 on the Chilean charts and was chosen as the most popular song at Huaso de Olmué Festival in 2009.

== Background ==
In 1965, he left several of his jobs to settle in Santiago de Chile as a journalist for Canal 9 of the University of Chile. In it, Manns met Luis "Chino" Urquidi, a composer and arranger who worked with Los Cuatro Cuartos, a group that cultivated neofolk. In April of that year, the Peña de los Parra was inaugurated and he met the most important Chilean producer of the time, Camilo Fernández, a Demon label executive (later called Arena) who had the intention of recording with all the musicians of the peña, including Manns. Fernández proposed the idea of recording a disk and promote him as a key figure of the Nueva canción chilena.

== Composition and recording ==
He wrote the song in a single night using as inspiration the memories he had of different moments in his young life. Especially one in which Manns and his cousin, emboldened by alcohol in their hometown, Nacimiento, decided to burn down the sawmill of a relative with whom "they were at odds". Although they did not get to perpetuate the act, the police went after them. Both started on horseback towards the Andean hills during weeks.

They first entered the interiors of Los Angeles, to then leave the place and travel towards the Atacalco pass, settling in Laguna del Laja—known as lagos cumbrereros—where they lived and knew the experiences of a group of muleteers, those who earned their living as rustlers steal Argentine cattle to sell them to Chilean territory such as Los Angeles or Mulchén. One of them told Manns that his father had been shot dead in Atacalco by Argentine gendarmerie while stealing cattle from their territory.

Manns also captured through the song's huapango rhythm his Mexican music lessons learned during childhood. The next day, Manns recorded it on the Demon label thanks to Camilo's initiative. It featured the chorus of Los Cuatro Cuartos, and two members from Las Cuatro Brujas, both summoned by Urquidi.

== Release ==
The song was released as single in 1965 on Demon label, it began to play on radio stations not accustomed to folk music and several copies of the single were sold out in almost all the record stores in Santiago, becoming the label's best-selling disk. It also reached No. 1 on the Chilean music charts, and then it was included along with other songs of his such as "Bandido" or "Los mares vacios" in 1966 album Entre Mar y Cordillera (Between Sea And Mountain Range), which was also released on said label and "which marked the development of nueva canción as an increasingly distinctive musical genre and exposed a wider public to this form of musical expression."

== Music video ==
The official music video was released in October 1972 under the direction of Hugo Arévalo, who is considered «the father of the video clip in Chile». In it, Patricio rides on horseback in Andes Mountains with a group of muleteers that both Manns and Arévalo obtained from the area of Farellones. According to the Arévalo words: "He had made this same story, this same section, he only tells his real experience, what he lived".

== Legacy ==
Manns after the success of "Arriba en la Cordillera", he was recognized as one of the main figures of neofolk. It was performed by various bands and singers such as Quilapayun, Inti-Illimani, Mon Laferte or Los Miserables. Ginette Acevedo achieved great success for his respective version of "Arriba en la Cordillera". Antuco declared Manns as an illustrious citizen for this song. In 1987, the Chilean rock band Emociones Clandestinas released the album Abajo en la costanera, with a parody title of the song.

It is considered one of the songs most representative of the Nueva canción chilena and one of the most important Chilean popular music of the 20th century as well as other such as "Gracias a la vida" by Violeta Parra or "Te recuerdo amanda" by Victor Jara. In January 2009, it was chosen as the most popular song in the history of Chile at Huaso de Olmué Festival, and as award, Manns received the Golden Guitrapin and 4 million pesos. Surpassing other compositions nominated as "Si somos americanos" by Rolando Alarcon, "Te recuerdo amanda" by Víctor Jara, "Volver a los 17" by Violeta Parra and "Viva Chile" by Luis Bahamonde.
