= Amar de Nuevo =

Amar de Nuevo may refer to:

- Amar de Nuevo (album), a 1998 album by Inti-Illimani
- "Amar de Nuevo", a 2024 song by Rauw Alejandro from Cosa Nuestra
- Amar de nuevo (TV series), a Spanish-language telenovela
