= Patricio Manns =

Chilean recording artist; musician (1937–2021)

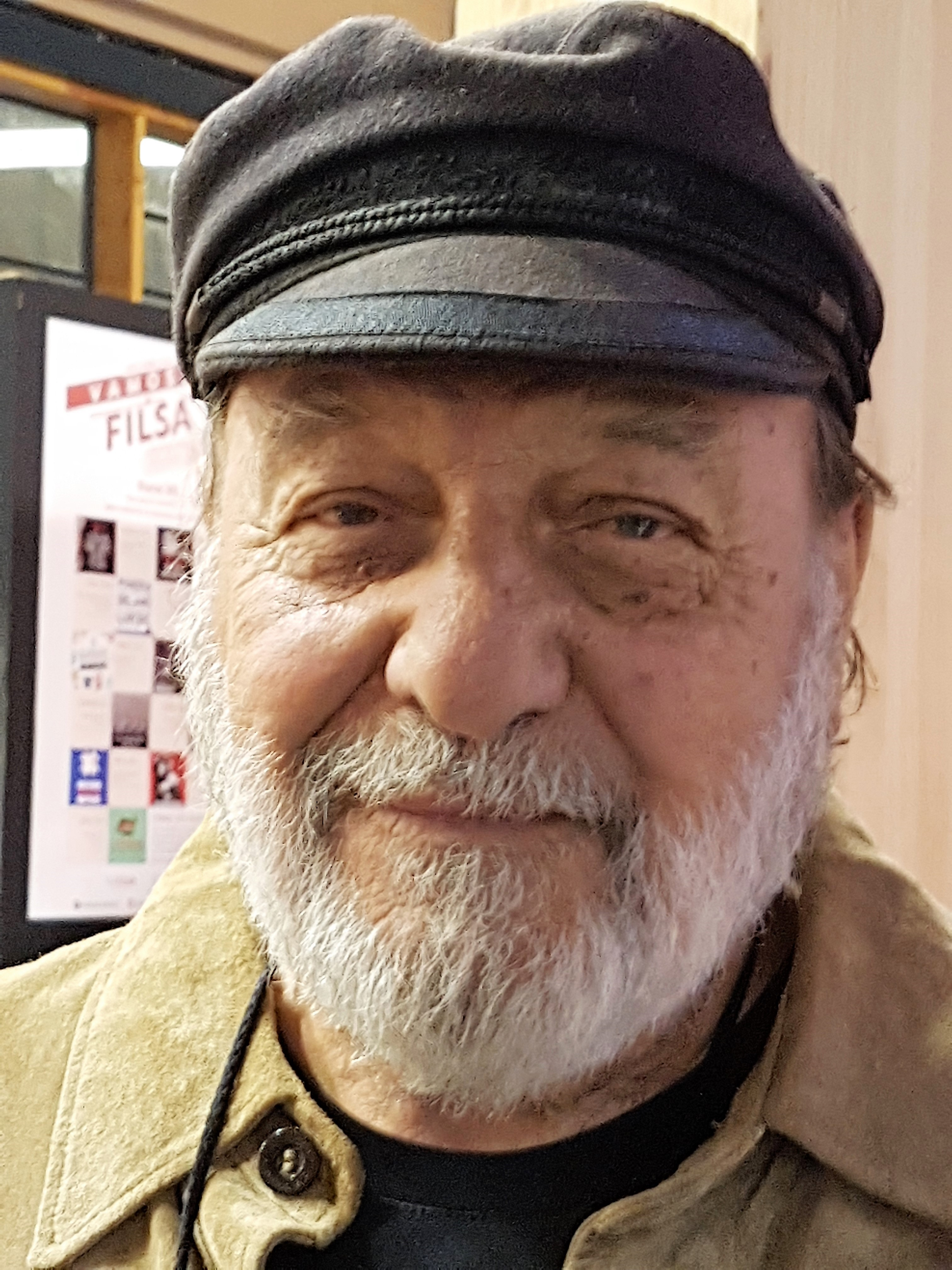
- Manns in 2017

Background information
- Born: Iván Patricio Eugenio Manns de Folliot; 3 August 1937; Nacimiento, Chile
- Died: 25 September 2021 (aged 84) Viña del Mar, Chile
- Genres: Folk, Latin music, world
- Occupations: Singer; composer; poet; novelist; playwright; essayist; journalist; social activist
- Instruments: Vocals, Spanish guitar
- Years active: 1959–2021
- Labels: CBS, Philips, Alerce Chant du Monde
- Formerly of: Violeta Parra, Quilapayún, Inti-illimani, Víctor Jara, Ángel Parra, Horacio Salinas, Isabel Parra, Sergio Ortega, Pablo Neruda, Francisco Coloane

Iván Patricio Eugenio Manns de Folliot, better known as Patricio Manns (3 August 1937 – 25 September 2021) was a Chilean singer-songwriter, composer, author, poet, novelist, essayist, journalist and writer. Manns has been a prominent representative of the so-called Nueva canción chilena. He is known for his 1965 song "Arriba en la Cordillera". In 2011, he won the folkloric competition of the 52nd Viña del Mar International Song Festival with the song "De Pascua Lama", performed by Valentina Sepúlveda and Diapasón Porteño.

== Life and career ==
=== Infancy and youth ===
Patricio Manns was born in the rural town of Nacimiento, in central Chile, on 3 August 1937. He is the son of a primary school teacher of French descent and an agricultural engineer of Swiss German descent. Both of his parents played the piano: his father was a jazz aficionado but his mother studied classical piano. Manns studied in the city of Angol, at the current Enrique Ballacey Cottereau Bicentennial High School of Excellence.

At the age of fourteen he published his poems for the first time in the newspaper El Colono de Traiguén, beginning a career as a writer that would last throughout his life. In 1963 he wrote his first novel, Parias en El Vedado, which he rewrote years later with the title La noche sobre el rastro, winning with it the Alerce prize, from the Sociedad de Escritores de Chile, in 1967.

In his youth he held the most diverse jobs: coal miner in Lota, truck driver, pharmacy clerk, until 1961 when he was hired as a journalist in the newspaper La Patria, in Concepción, and radio trainer at the María Elena nitrate office, in the middle of the Atacama desert.

In the early 1960s, he moved to Santiago where he continued his journalistic work. In addition, he tried out at the University of Chile Club, where he was left as goalkeeper with Adolfo Nef, but he could not continue his football career because the leadership made him choose between football and music, Manns choosing to continue his musical career.

=== Early music career ===
Manns was initiated in the field of music when he composed Bandido in 1959, which was recorded in Argentina in 1962 by the folk group Los Travadores del Norte and in Chile by Los Cuatro Cuartos. But it was with the composition Arriba en la cordillera (Up in the Cordillera) in 1965 that he achieved national fame – especially when it was released in the album, Entre Mar y Cordillera (Between Sea and Cordillera) in 1966 on Vinyl format by the label "Demon" under the number LPD-021, all songs are credited to Manns, the song "Ya no canto tu nombre" is credited to Edmundo Vásquez, on track n ° 8 of the album, "Sirilla de la Candelaria" featured Rolando Alarcón, a singer-songwriter Chilean. The album was a massive success, other singles were added to the album, such as "Bandido" or "Vai Peti Nehe Nehe", a song with a title and lyrics in the Pascuense language.

Manns was a founding member (1965) of the New Chilean Song, with Rolando Alarcón and the Parras (the children of Violeta Parra: Isabel and Ángel Parra) and of the Peña of Carmen 340 (later known as the Peña of the Parras), Víctor Jara joined the Peña and the movement a few months later. Nueva Canción Chilena (New Chilean Song) movement – for some a folkloric renaissance which led to a revolution in the popular music of the country. At the time of the 1973 Chilean coup d'état - which toppled the democratically elected socialist government of Salvador Allende - the Nueva Canción Chilena had acquired a nationwide mass following with Nueva Canción Chilena artists touring the world as cultural ambassadors.

Manns would go on to actively participate in the extensive production of a series of travelling shows called Chile Rie y Canta (Chile Laughs and Sings) which were organized throughout Chile by René Largo Farías. In this early period of his career Manns also composed the cantata El Sueño Americano (The American Dream) (1965), which he recorded with the folk group Voces Andina and that amalgamates distinctive rhythmic elements from different regions of the sub-continent. In this song, which has been traced as one of the firsts cantatas to be heard in Latin America, the historical birth of Latin America is told. Song XII of the cantata América Novia Mia (America My Bride) has been recorded by himself and Inti-illimani several times. During this period he also recorded ¡El Folclore No Ha Muerto, Mierda! (Folklore Hasn't Died, Dammit!) (1968) with Silvia Urbina which revived folkloric forms which were disappearing under the influence of foreign musical trends that were being popularized in Chile.

From his multi-faceted role as singer, composer, writer and journalist he actively collaborated in the presidential campaigns of Dr. Salvador Allende in 1964 and in 1970, the latter being the campaign that led Salvador Allende to the presidency as the leader of the Unidad Popular government. During this time he recorded the album Patricio Manns (1971) which included one of his best-known compositions Valdivia en la niebla (Valdivia in the fog) and the prophetic No Cierres los Ojos (Don't Close Your Eyes). In this recording, which was accompanied by Inti-illimani, the Symphony Orchestra of Chile and the Philharmonic Orchestra of Santiago, the musical arrangements were done by Luis Advis.

=== Life in exile ===
The military coup of 11 September 1973 found him in Chile and it was only due to international diplomatic mediation that he was able to safely leave his country. Late in 1973, Manns settled in Cuba where he began a life in exile that was to last decades. During his period in the Caribbean island he composed and recorded accompanied by the Symphony Orchestra of Cuba Cuando Me Acuerdo de Mi País (When I Remember My Country, some years later recorded by Mercedes Sosa) and other songs that were featured in his LP Canción sin Limites (Songs without limits). He collaborated with Humberto Solás with the script for the movie La Cantata de Chile (Cantata of Chile) (1976) and also wrote the text for the musical work of Leo Brouwer which the movie was named after.

From Cuba he travelled to France where he settled and formed the ensemble Karaxú in 1974 with which he continued to musically collaborate with Cuban artists. From exile Manns launched his "struggle against the Pinochet dictatorship" becoming a spokesman of the Chilean resistance. This was also reflected in almost all his musical productions: Chansons de la Résistence Chilienne (Songs of the Chilean Resistance) (1974). Canción sin limites (Songs without limits) (1977). In this stage of exile he met Alejandra Lastra (1979) to whom he composed the famous Balada de los Amantes del Camino de Tavernay (Ballad of the Lovers of Tavernay Road) (1981) – Manns had moved and settled with his partner in Chemin de Tavernay in Geneva in the course of 1979.

As the musicologist Juan Pablo González has stated: "... in his 27 years of exile, Manns established with Horacio Salinas one of the most fruitful creative collaborations in the history of Chilean music".

This collaboration began to take form in the works of Inti-illimani, in compositions such as Retrato (Portrait) or Vuelvo (I Return) – both from 1979. From this period of work with Salinas and Inti-illimani we find the grains of songs which with time would grow to become true emblems of the Latin America folk/popular music repertoire: such as El Equipaje del Destierro (The Baggage of Exile), Palimpsesto (Palimpsest) (1981), Cantiga de la Memoria Rota (Verses for a Shattered Memory) and Samba Landó (1985). Subsequently, other songs of this collaborative period included Medianoche (Midnight), Arriesgare mi piel (I'll Risk My Skin) (1996) and La Fiesta Eres Tú (You Are the Party) (1998).

In 1984 he moved to Trez Vella in Échenevex, close to the French-Swiss border. In this stage of exile Manns reached a high point in his creativity with the Concert of Trez Vella (1986), a piece that was arranged by Alejandro Guarello, also dedicated to Alejandra. He recorded it in Rome accompanied by Inti-Illimani in 1985 and was released in 1986 in Europe. This work with Inti-illimani appeared in his third album with them: La muerte no va conmigo. He had previously recorded in Rome with them Con la Razón y la Fuerza in early 1980.

=== The re-encounter ===
After 17 years of exile in 1990 Manns was allowed to enter Chile and began his return to Chile in August that year, touring and performing throughout the country. The tour started on 23 August in the Teatro Teletón and on the 24th in the Estadio Chile (now renamed Estadio Víctor Jara). On TVN, he performed for the first time in Chile his emotionally charged Cuando Me Acuerdo de Mi País (When I Remember My Country) before an anxious public in the studio and before a nationwide audience. From this tour of Chile, which included Santiago, Concepción, Valparaíso and Viña del Mar, Manns would comment: "... for now I have accomplished the basic priority of setting foot in my country again". However, since there were pending political trials against him he returned to Trez Vella in September the same year. The second step, the definitive return was only to be in 2000, when he decided to return and settle in Chile in the area of Concón.

=== 21st century ===
The creative and artistic collaboration between Manns and Horacio Salinas continued with works interpreted by Inti-illimani such as La Rosa de los Vientos (Rose of the Winds) (1999) and Cantares del Mito Americano (Songs on the American Myth) an unrecorded work that was performed in the Teatro Municipal of Viña del Mar in 2001. Horacio Salinas collaborated with Patricio Manns in the production of his first record as a soloist Remos en el Agua (Oars on the Water) released in November 2003. Manns also participated in Inti-Illimani's DVD Lugares Comunes (Common Places) recorded live in the Estadio Nacional de Chile. Manuel Meriño put music to Manns now famous poem Vino del Mar (She Came from the Sea) dedicated to Marta Ugarte one of the victims of the Chilean military dictatorship, song which was recorded by Inti-Illimani's Lugares Comunes (Common Places) in 2003.

During the four century celebration of the city of Nacimiento in December 2003, Manns was named an "illustrious son" of this city.

In September 2003 he launched his work Allende: la Dignidad Se Convierte en Costumbre (Allende: When Dignity Becomes a Custom) in the Estadio Nacional in homage to President Salvador Allende.

In 2005 he recorded with the Ulli Simon Ensemble in Germany; in 2006 he collaborated in composing songs for Inti-Illimani's album Pequeño Mundo (Small World) and Esencial (Essential). He also recorded a CD with Mexican rancheras and corridos for a musical production of the Banco del Estado (Chile's State Bank). He also recorded a CD of ballads and boleros titled Porque Te Amé (Because I Loved You) which was highly received in countries like Mexico and Peru.

In 2010 he released La tierra entera. In 2011 La tierra entera won the Altazor Award as the best record of popular music of 2010.

In 2011, his song The Pascua Lama won the Viña del Mar Music Festival as the best song of folk-roots.

Manns lived in Central Chile where he has focused on the development of his literary career while he continued performing and creating music.

== Death ==
Manns died of heart failure at the Clínica Bupa de Reñaca in Viña del Mar on 25 September 2021, at the age of 84.

== Discography ==
=== Studio albums ===
- 1965: Entre Mar y Cordillera
- 1966: El Sueño Americano (with Voces Andinas)
- 1967: ¡El Folclore No Ha Muerto, Mierda! (with Silvia Urbina)
- 1968: La Hora Final
- 1971: Patricio Manns
- 1974: Chants de la Résistance Populaire Chilienne (with Karaxú)
- 1977: Canción Sin Límites (with the EGREM Orchestra of Cuba)
- 1983: Con la Razón y la Fuerza o la Araucana (with Inti Illimani)
- 1986: La Muerte No Va Conmigo (with Inti Illimani)
- 1998: Porque Te Amé
- 2003: Allende: La Dignidad Se Convierte en Costumbre
- 2010: La tierra entera
- 2016: La emoción de vivir

=== Live albums ===
- 1975: Karaxú Live (live with Karaxú)
- 1983: Itinerario de un Retorno (in Mexico)
- 1990: Patricio Manns en Chile (in Chile)
- 2000: América, Novia Mía

=== Compilation albums ===
- 1983: Cuando Me Acuerdo de Mi País
- 1999: Arriba en la Cordillera
- 2015: Legado de Trovadores (Arriba en la Cordillera, 50 años)

== Literature ==
Manns is one of the most prolific writers in Chile. His literary creations embrace various genres, from novels with historical themes to essays and plays and he has published more than 30 works. His textual constructs and the seamless conductive literary technique he uniquely employs have made him the subject of scholarly study in various European and Latin American schools of literature and universities.

== Bibliography ==
=== Fiction ===
- De noche sobre el rastro (1967)
- Buenas noches los pastores (Goodnight shepherds) (1973)
- Actas de Marusia (1974)
- Actas del alto Bío Bío (1985)
- Actas de muerteputa (1988)
- De repente los lugares desaparecen (Suddenly places disappear) (1991)
- El corazón a contraluz (Cavalier seul in France) (1996)
- Memorial de la noche (Night Memorial) (1998)
- El desorden en un cuerno de niebla (1999)
- A traveller's Literary Companion (2003, several authors).
- La vida privada de Emile Dubois (The private life of Emile Dubois) (2004)
- Diversos instantes del reino (Diverse instants of the kingdom) (2006)
- El lento silbido de los sables, Editorial Catalonia (2010)

"La conjetura escita" Editorial Catalonia, (2013). "Música prohibida" Editorial El Tabo, (2014).

=== Plays ===
- 2000 - La lámpara en la tierra (The Lamp on Earth) (France). Puesta en escena por Esequiel García Romeu.
- 2011 - Memorial de la noche (Chile). Puesta en escena por Adrian Montealegre, grupo de teatro Manos a la obra.
- 2011 - La matanza (Chile). Puesta en escena por Iván Insuza, grupo de teatro Kapital.

=== Poetry ===
- Memorial de Bonampak (Bonampak Memorial) (2003) (Brosquil, Spain).
- Cantología (2004) (updated in April 2012), Editorial Catalonia, Chile.
- "Los dolores del miembro fantasma" LOM 2014.

== Film ==
The 1975 movie Letters from Marusia directed by Miguel Littin was based on a novel by the same name that Manns published in 1974. The movie – which featured Gian Maria Volonté in the principal role - caused great controversy and unease among conservative circles in Chile at the time of its release. This movie won several awards and was also nominated for an Oscar in 1976 in the Best Foreign Language Film category.

== Awards and recognition ==
Manns is broadly recognized for his multi-faceted prolific career as a musician and literary figure. He is a founder of the movement of neo-folkloric popular music that emerged in Chile in the 1960s and constituted a fundamental nexus between the Nueva Canción Chilena (New Chilean Song) movement and more current musical developments. As a literary figure he has developed in the field of poetry, as a non-fiction writer, in novels and in theatre. Manns has been awarded numerous prizes - both national and international – for recognition in his fields, among them are:

- His first song "Bandido", written in 1956 and interpreted by the Chilean group from Concepción "Los Andinos", won the Cosquin Festival, Argentina in 1959 and it was one of the first awards Manns received.
- Premio Alerce (Alerce Prize) from the SECH (Society of Chilean Writers) organization and the University of Chile (1967)
- Santiago Municipal Literature Award (1973). This prize was officially awarded 25 years later in 1998.
- Guggenheim Fellowship (1988)
- Prix Rhône-Alpes: The French edition of his novel El Corazón a Contraluz (Cavalier Seul) was selected as one of the best novels published in France in 1996.
- Premio del Consejo Nacional del Libro y la Lectura (2001) for the anthology of short stories in his Corre Hasta los Arboles (Run to the trees), which was published by Editorial Sudamericana as La Tumba del Zambullidor.
- Premio Municipal de Literatura de Valparaíso (2003). Prize given to him for the sum of his literary work.
- The Chilean Society of Writers (SCD) officially recognizes him as a Fundamental Figure of Chilean music (2006).
- In 2009 his song "Arriba en la cordillera" was awarded as the best popular song ever made, and Manns was awarded as the best interpreter of the Olmue Musical Festival competing for the best song of all time.
- In 2011 his song De Pascua Lama won the Viña del Mar International Music Festival as the best song of popular music.
- In 2011 he obtained the Altazor Award given by his peers for La tierra entera considered the best record of popular music recorded in 2010.
