= Viva Chile! =

Studio album by Inti-Illimani
- Released: 1973
- Genre: Nueva Cancion Chilena
- Labels: I Dischi Dello Zodiaco Italy; Parlophone UK

Inti-Illimani chronology
| Canto de pueblos andinos (1972) | Viva Chile! (1973) | La nueva canción chilena (1974) |

Viva Chile was the first album by the group Inti-Illimani recorded while in exile. It was released in 1973.

== Track listing ==
=== Side A ===
1. La Fiesta de San Benito (Popular Boliviana)
2. Longuita (Popular Ecuatoriana)
3. Canción del Poder Popular (Julio Rojas, Luis Advis)
4. Alturas (Horacio Salinas)
5. La Segunda independencia (Rubén Lena)
6. Cueca de la C.U.T. (Héctor Pavez)

=== Side B ===
1. Tatati (Horacio Salinas)
2. Venceremos (Claudio Iturra, Sergio Ortega)
3. Ramis (Popular)
4. 'Rin' del Angelito (Violeta Parra)
5. Subida (Ernesto Cavour)
6. Simon Bolivar (Rubén Lena, Isidro Contreras)
