= Entrama =

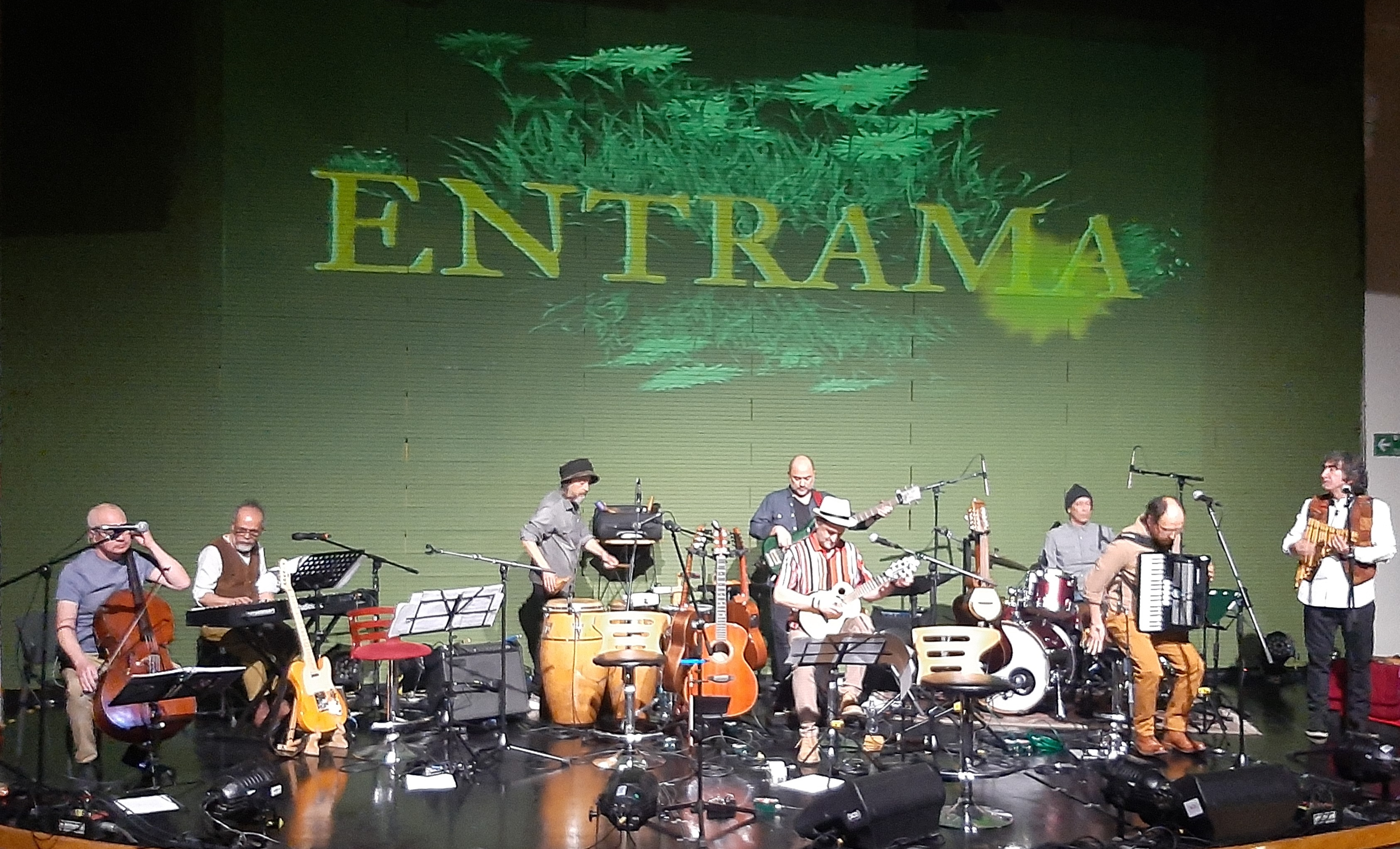
- Entrama in 2024

Background information
- Origin: Santiago, Chile
- Genres: Folk music, Latin American music, world music, progressive rock, contemporary music
- Years active: 1997–present
- Website: entrama.scd.cl

Entrama is a Chilean music group that since its inception in 1997 develops instrumental music, fusing styles such as Latin American music of folkloric origin (or Latin American fusion), with jazz and classical music, mainly using compositional techniques derived from the latter. It has also been catalogued as world music. According to the specialized critics they have been called as popular musicians for refined and demanding listeners.

== History ==
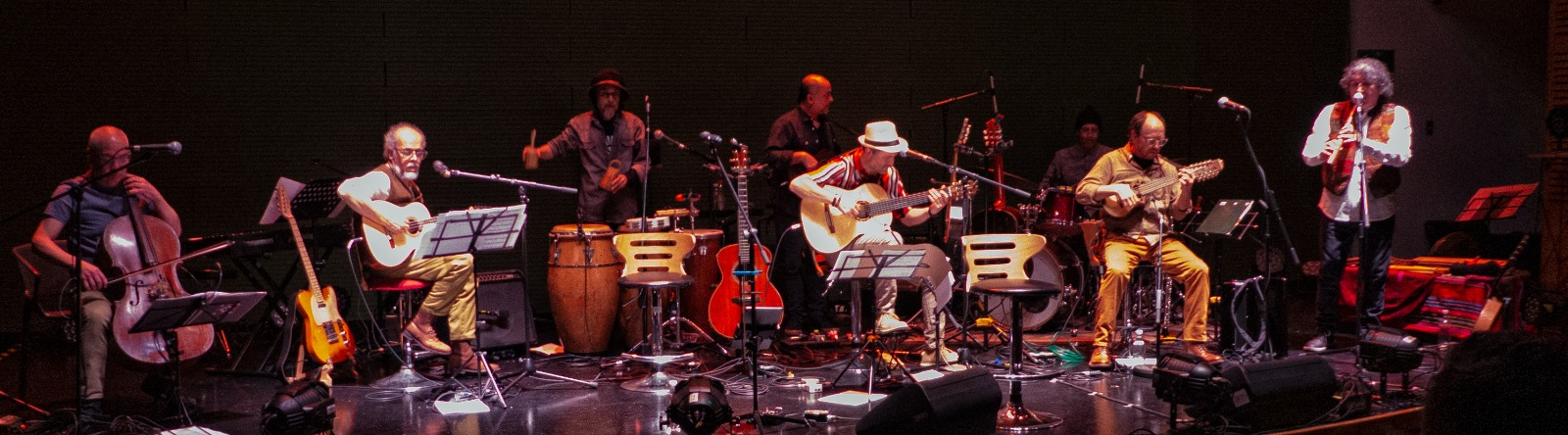
Entrama at Sala SCD in Plaza Egaña in 2024

In October 1997 they made their first concert at the Teatro Universidad de Chile. Then the label Mundo Vivo proposed the recording of the first album, a project that took form in March 1998.

The year 1998 culminated with three important recognitions: The SCD (Chilean Copyright Society) granted Entrama the award -now recognized as Pulsar- for the interpretation as Best Group in the Jazz Fusión genre; and two of its members: Juan Antonio Sánchez and Manuel Meriño, were awarded as the best composer and best acoustic guitar player, respectively.

In 1999 Entrama composed the incidental music for the documentary about the work of the Chilean painter Roberto Matta, entitled "A century of mind", interview that was made by the Chilean intellectual Volodia Teitelboim. In 2001 they obtained a Fondart (Fund for the Development of Culture and the Arts) to finance the production of their second recording, Centro, an album that remains in the same instrumental line that characterizes them.

During 2003 they performed a concert with the Symphony Orchestra of the Universidad de Concepción, where they presented orchestral arrangements of compositions belonging to their two previous recordings: Entrama and Centro. This experience gave rise to their third record production entitled Simbólico "Symbolic", published in April 2005 thanks to the support of Fondart and which constituted an important moment for the musical development for the group as it proposes a new format that enhances the sound possibilities of the group when inserted in a symphonic context.

In May 2012 they released their new album Año luz (light year) after seven years without producing a record. The album features two songs, for the first time with voices with lyrics, and more use of piano than the previous albums.

They have made international tours to Canada (2006), Peru (2011), and Argentina (2014).

The depth of Entrama’s musical and instrumental quest makes possible the creation of a musical weave (as the word ‘Entrama’ implies) whose threads transform this music band in a bridge between Latin-American folk, popular, classical, jazz, and world music.

== Influences ==
Among their main influences are Congreso, Víctor Jara, Inti-Illimani, Violeta Parra, Los Jaivas, Horacio Salinas, Tilo González, Roberto Márquez, Antonio Restucci, Luis Advis, Latinomusicaviva, Silvio Rodríguez, Leo Brouwer, Antonio Lauro, Egberto Gismonti, Hermeto Pascoal, Heitor Villa-Lobos, Chico Buarque, Caetano Veloso, Jaques Morelenbaum, Astor Piazzolla, Flairck, Ralph Towner, Pat Metheny, Paco de Lucía, Dino Saluzzi, Ensamble Gurrufío, Editus, The Beatles, Sting, Bach, Satie, Ravel, Stravinsky, and many more.

== Members ==
=== Current ===
- Pedro Suau, (1997–present) direction, quena, flute, zampoña and tarka
- Rodrigo Durán, (1997–present) cello
- Carlos Basilio, (1997–present) percussion
- Daniel Delgado, (1998–present) guitar, percussion and accordion
- Marcelo Arenas, (2000–present) batería
- Guillermo Correa, (2001–present) guitar and mandolin
- Sebastián Iglesias, (2001–present) bass
- Juan Antonio Sanchez (1997–2001, 2017–present) guitar

=== Past ===
- Manuel Meriño, (1997–2001) guitarra
- Ítalo Pedrotti, (1997–2006) charango
- Pedro Melo, (1997–2014) bajo, flauta, teclado

== Discography ==
- Entrama (Mundovivo 1998)
- Centro (Prod. Independiente 2001)
- Simbólico (Mundovivo 2005)
- Año Luz (2012)
- El fuego de la memoria Vol. I (Mundovivo June 2022).
- El fuego de la memoria Vol. II (Mundovivo October 2022).
