= Venceremos (song) =

Chilean song written by Claudio Iturra

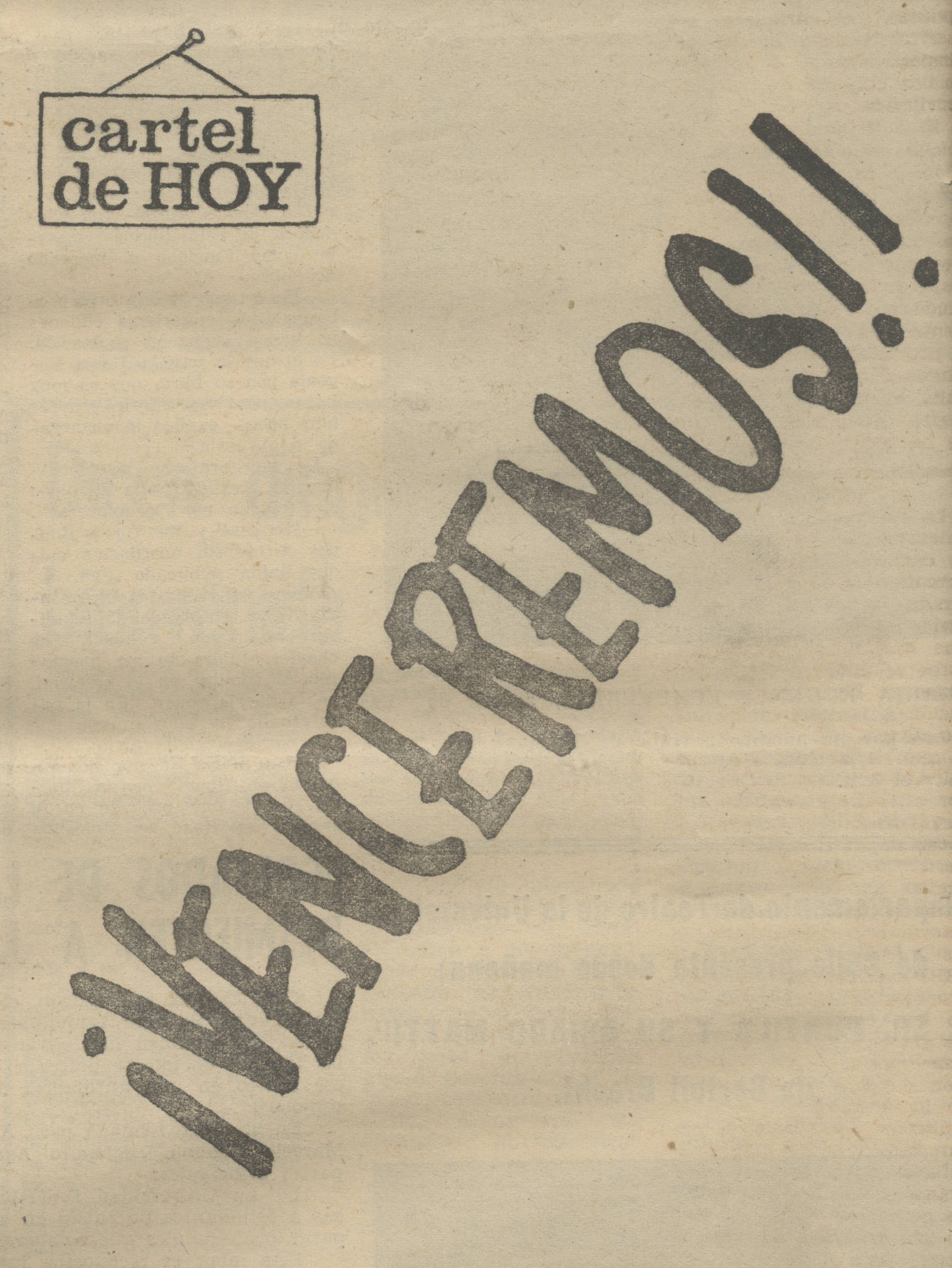
- "El cartel de hoy" section in the Puro Chile newspaper with the phrase from the song with exclamations "¡Venceremos!".

Song
- Language: Spanish
- Released: 1970
- Recorded: 1964
- Genre: Folk; Nueva canción Nueva canción chilena
- Composer: Sergio Ortega
- Lyricist: Claudio Iturra

Venceremos (Spanish: [benseˈɾemos]; translated as "We will prevail") is a Chilean folk song that was the anthem of the Popular Unity, a left-wing political bloc that brought Chilean socialist politician Salvador Allende Gossens to the presidency of Chile in 1970. It was originally popularized by the Chilean groups Quilapayún and Inti-Illimani.

== Composition and recording ==
The music was composed by Sergio Ortega Alvarado and the lyrics were written by Claudio Iturra, in the first half of the 1960s. It was used during the third presidential campaign of Salvador Allende in 1964 presidential election, in which Eduardo Frei Montalva was elected. Since this first version was very poorly recorded, for the 1970 presidential election it was set to music again, this time by the Chilean folk group Quilapayún, between the house of Eduardo Carrasco, a founding member of the band, and Ortega’s plot of land in Lo Cañas, the current La Florida, Santiago.

Chilean historian and director of the History Institute at San Sebastián University (Universidad San Sebastián, USS), Alejandro San Francisco, explained to La Tercera in the Culto section that ""Venceremos" was clearly a milestone, like Alessandri's "Cielito lindo" in 1920 or like the "No" anthem would be in 1988, each with its own context and history. In the case of 1970, it responds to the maxim "there is no revolution without songs"; it has inclusive and meaningful lyrics, as well as an easy-to-learn chorus, attractive to sing, and that invited people to victory." The lyrics from the second version for the 1970 presidential campaign were written by Víctor Jara, on the same Ortega music. "Venceremos" with lyrics by Víctor was recorded in the studio in 1970 by Quilapayún. This version is the first recording of the song currently available.

Chilean folk band Inti-Illimani, at the initiative of the Communist Youth of Chile to promote the electoral program of the Popular Unity government, released the album Canto al programa in 1970. This album, in the style of a cantata, included the anthem "Venceremos" with Iturra's original lyrics. The lyrics were written by Julio Rojas, and the music was composed by Luis Advis and Sergio Ortega. Alberto Sendra participated in narrating the "Relato" tracks on the album.

== Legacy ==
"Venceremos" is currently one of the most recognized songs of the Nueva canción chilena movement, and is an example of the Nueva canción more general movement, and of Chilean protest music, which had been gaining momentum for much of the previous decade. This song marks a significant recognition of the political thrust of this movement in its use as a tool of propaganda for the Popular Unity coalition. Following the success of "Venceremos", Allende famously stated "there can be no revolution without song". "Venceremos" also became the unofficial anthem of the Republic of Chile during the government of Salvador Allende. This song has appeared on various official albums, being performed by multiple musical artists mainly Quilapayún and Inti-Illimani.

It was translated into numerous other languages. Hans Georg Albig translated the song into German. American singer-songwriter Dean Reed, who achieved success in Chile and visited him on several occasions, performed the song on numerous and outstanding occasions in Spanish original lyrics; He performed "Venceremos" during his visit to Czechoslovakia in 1975, in the film El Cantor (The Singer), dedicated to the Chilean singer-songwriter Víctor Jara and written and starring him in the role of Víctor himself, it was produced by East German television and released on December 11, 1977, and in the 1979 Soviet film, I Wish You Well (Russian: Я желаю вам счастья, romanized: YA zhelayu vam schast'ya). Years after the 1973 Chilean coup d'état, it was first sung in public in Chile by Dean on August 18, 1983, at a rally of the El Teniente miners in Rancagua. Dean changed part of the lyrics that said "Remembering the brave soldier" to "Remembering Salvador Allende."

== Versions ==
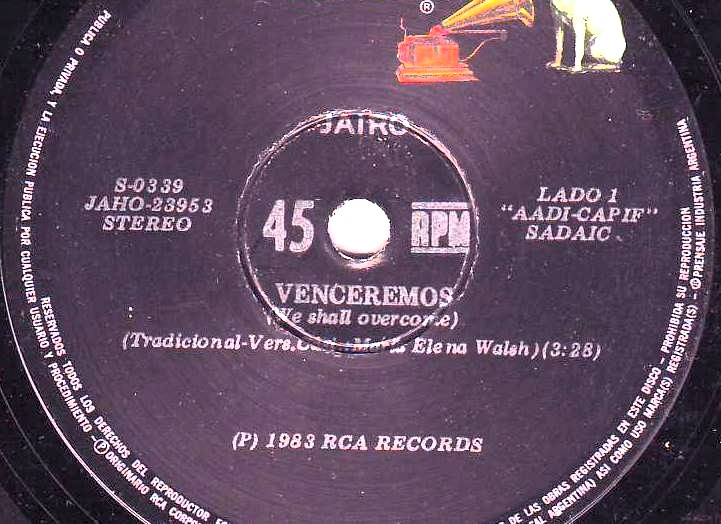
1983 version by Jairo

From Quilapayún

- 1970 - Venceremos / UP (EP, 1st and 2nd version)
- 1971 - Venceremos (single)
- 1971 - Vivir como él
- 1974 - Vorwärts lieder (collective)
- 1977 - Enregistrement Public (live)
- 1977 - La marche et le drapeau (compilation)
- 2006 - La fuerza de la historia (compilation)

By Inti Illimani

- 1972 - Chile town (collective)
- 1973 - We will win / The people united (single)
- 1973 - Viva Chile!
- 1973 - Politische lieder (collective, live)
- 1980 - Zehnkampf - Festival des politischen Liedes 1970-1980 (compilation, collective)

Others

- 1970 - Canto libre, by Víctor Jara (musicalized by Víctor and Patricio Castillo)
- 1974 - Konzert für Chile, by various artists (collective, live)
- 1977 - Song to the October Revolution, by the Soviet Army Choir (collective)
- 1985 - Vorwärts, nicht vergessen solidarität!, by Quilapayún or Inti-Illimani (compilation, collective)
- 2003 - We will win - Tribute to Salvatore Allende, by Ventiscka (collective)

This song has been used as a second international song, since it is in several languages, among these are:, Italian, Japanese, Russian, Portuguese, Finnish. etc.

== Lyrics ==
Lyrics in original language (Spanish)

Desde el hondo crisol de la patria
se levanta el clamor popular;
ya se anuncia la nueva alborada,
todo Chile comienza a cantar.

Recordando al soldado valiente
cuyo ejemplo lo hiciera inmortal
enfrentemos primero a la muerte:
traicionar a la patria jamás.

Venceremos, venceremos
mil cadenas habrá que romper
venceremos, venceremos,
al fascismo sabremos vencer!

Venceremos, venceremos
mil cadenas habrá que romper
venceremos, venceremos,
al fascismo sabremos vencer!

Campesinos, soldados y obreros,
la mujer de la patria también,
estudiantes, empleados, mineros
cumpliremos con nuestro deber.

Sembraremos la tierra de gloria;
socialista será el porvenir,
todos juntos seremos la historia,
a cumplir, a cumplir, a cumplir.

Venceremos, venceremos
mil cadenas habrá que romper
venceremos, venceremos,
al fascismo sabremos vencer!

Lyrics in English

From the deep crucible of the homeland
the peoples voices rises up;
The new dawn is announced,
all of Chile starts singing.

Remembering the brave soldier
whose example made him immortal
first we confront death:
our homeland we´ll never betray.

We shall prevail, We shall prevail[2]
a thousand chains we´ll have to break
We shall prevail, We shall prevail,
We can overcome fascism[1]!

We shall prevail, We shall prevail
a thousand chains we´ll have to break
We shall prevail, We shall prevail,
We can overcome fascism[1]!

Peasants, soldiers and miners[3]
the woman of the homeland as well,
students, employees, workers[3]
We will fulfil our duty.

We will sow the land of glory;
socialist will be our future,
all together we will be the history ,
to fulfill, to fulfill, to fulfill.

We shall prevail, We shall prevail[2]
a thousand chains we´ll have to break
We shall prevail, We shall prevail,
We can overcome fascism[1]!

We shall prevail, We shall prevail
a thousand chains we´ll have to break
We shall prevail, We shall prevail,
We can overcome fascism[1]!

1: There are variations that instead of fascism say misery

2: there are variations in which the chorus is not repeated

3: there are variations in which they change workers for miners

== See also ==
- El pueblo unido jamás será vencido
- List of socialist songs
