= Max Berrú =

Ecuadorian-Chilean musician

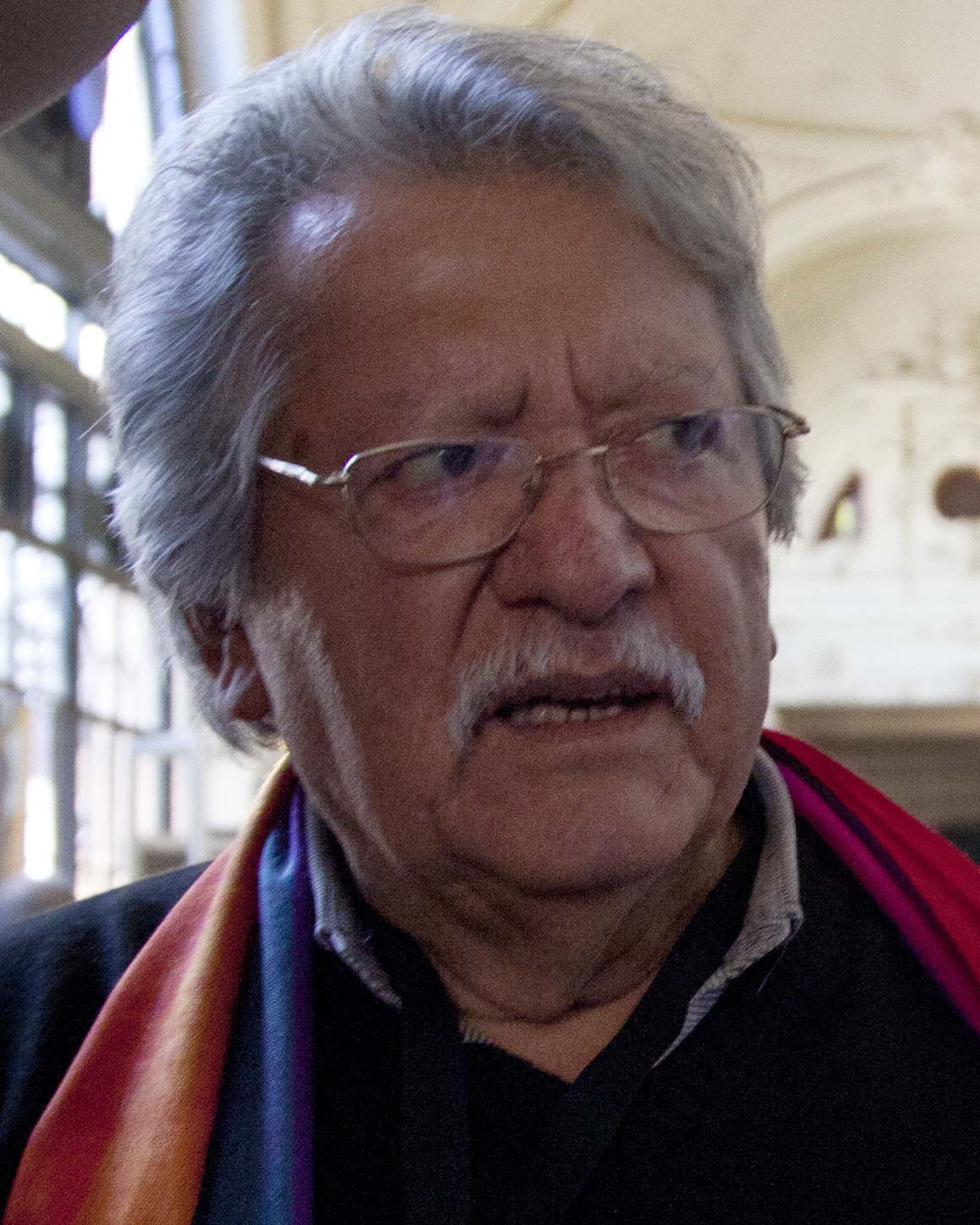
Max Berrú in 2012

Max Berrú Carrión (June 5, 1942 – May 1, 2018) was an Ecuadorian and Chilean musician. He was one of the two founders of Inti-Illimani where he was a lead singer between 1967 and 1997.

== Life ==
Berrú was born in Cariamanga, Loja Province, Ecuador, in 1942, and emigrated to Chile in 1962 for university education. Graduated as a mechanical engineer in Chile where he met Jorge Coulon at the same university. After graduating, Max worked as an engineer for two years until he met his true passion in music. Max and Jorge began their musical career by playing Latin American music as a duet while studying at the Universidad Técnica del Estado in Santiago circa 1967, where they founded what became the first Inti Illimani ensemble. The name was inspired by the culture and folklore of South America to which Max wanted to pay tribute, and that is how he came up with the name. Later on, they contacted other musicians to expand the musical possibilities and reach other horizons and musical expressions.

Berrú was the original lead singer of Inti Illimani, and in some concerts still was. Before his death he owned a restaurant in Santiago called Mitad del Mundo ("Middle of the World"), in reference to his Ecuadorian origins.

He died in Santiago, Chile, on May 1, 2018.
