= Rolando Alarcón =

- Born: Rolando Alarcón Soto; August 5, 1929
- Died: February 4, 1973 (aged 43)
- Genres: Folk; Nueva Canción
- Occupations: Singer-songwriter teacher
- Instrument: Guitar
- Years active: 1951–1973
- Formerly of: Cuncumén; Silvia Urbina; Patricio Manns; Inti-Illimani
- Website: rolandoalarcon.cl

Rolando Alarcón Soto (August 5, 1929 – February 4, 1973) was a Chilean singer-songwriter and teacher, who was one of the main figures of the movement Nueva canción chilena. He was the artistic director of Cuncumén, one of the most important Chilean folk groups in the 20th century. During the 1970s, Rolando was a political activist for the Popular Unity of the socialist president Salvador Allende.

== Biography ==
=== Early life ===
Rolando Alarcón Soto born on August 5, 1929, son of a primary school teacher and a miner, he lived most of his childhood in Sewell and adolescence in Chillan, where he studied guitar and piano. In the 1950s, Alarcón moved to Santiago de Chile, where he trained as a teacher, teaching in public schools. In 1955, as a result of the summer season schools taught by Margot Loyola at the University of Chile, the Cuncumén group was formed, in which Alarcon took over as artistic director during seven years. They toured Europe, recorded six LPs and was consolidated as one of the main folk conglomerates in Chile.

=== Career ===
In 1960 when Alarcón was still part of group Cuncumén, his first album titled Traditional Chilean Songs, was released in United States on the Folkways Records label. The album consists mainly of Chileans traditional songs from the 19th century. In 1988 the Alerce label reissued the album under translated title Canciones tradicionales. Rolando with Silvia Urbina joined at the La imagen de Chile tour held in Peru, Panama and United States. In 1962, after socialist countries tour, Silvia and Rolando left the Cuncumén group and started a duo that resulted in Chile nuevo vol. 1, a 1964 album consisting of six songs written by Clemente Izurieta, Richard Rojas and himself. During 1963, he composed some solo songs like "Doña Javiera Carrera", a song from that album, which won a composition competition for schools. "¿A dónde vas, soldado?" was included in the 1966 album, Rolando Alarcón, that generated a lot of controversy for its antimilitarist content. Others were of social commitment as "Yo defiendo a mi tierra" (I defend my land); and others more linked to the Chilean tradition, such as "Mocito que vas remando" (Little boy you're going rowing).

Later, he joined the cast of La pérgola de las flores for a tour in Mexico, in which he composed "Si somos americanos" (If we are Americans), a song of clear continental feeling which like others by Alarcón such as "Yo defiendo a mi tierra" and "Mocito que vas remando" were included in the 1965 album Rolando Alarcón y sus canciones, released on RCA Victor label. "Si somos americanos" was released as a single and reached number 8 on the Chilean charts. Since 1965, he was one of the permanent artists of the Peña de los Parra, along with other outstanding Chilean singer-songwriters such as Victor Jara or Patricio Manns. In 1967, he represented the Chilean singers in the First Protest Song Festival held in Cuba. In 1966, he participated in the Festival de Viña, achieving third place with the song "Niña, sube a la lancha" performed by Pedro Messone. In 2000, it was chosen among the ten best songs in the history of the festival. By 1967, Rolando decided to incorporate the Rock rhythms of Los Tickets for El nuevo Rolando Alarcón.

In 1968, he released Canciones de la guerra civil española on his recently created label, Tiempo, an album composed primarily of pro-republican Spanish songs, the only original track is "No pasaran". Carlos Valladares and Enrique San Martín from Los Emigrantes participated in the musical accompaniment. In 1969, he got an honorable mention at the First Festival of the Nueva Canción Chilena with the song "Canción de Juan el pobre" (included in the next album El Hombre). In 1970, he won on the Viña del Mar International Song Festival with the song "El Hombre" (from the namesake album), performed by Los Emigrantes.

In 1971, Canta a los poetas soviéticos was released on the DICAP label, where he performs the work of the poet Yevgeni Yevtushenko and the singer-songwriter Bulat Okudzhava. In 1972, he released his last studio album titled El alma de mi pueblo, that featured the duo adherent to the then Popular Unity Los Emigrantes. By this date, Alarcón was a determined activist in the campaign that would bring the socialist president Salvador Allende and the Popular Unity to power in Chile. As an enthusiast of the cause, he participated intensely until in 1973, in the middle of a tour of Chile Ríe y Canta, he suffered a heart attack when he tried to push a bus on the Matadero-Palma route. An old ulcer caused internal bleeding, and he died on February 4 at the Salvador Hospital, Santiago due to cardiac arrest.

== Posthumous recognitions ==
After his death, the Lonqui Trio composed as homage "Canción para Rolando". In 2009, the teacher Carlos Valladares and the journalist Manuel Vilches published the book Rolando Alarcón: La canción en la noche (Rolando Alarcón, the song in the night), through Editora Nacional Quimantú, a biography about his life and work. In this book, some problems details that Alarcón faced due to his homosexuality were revealed, the Communist Party of Chile came to punish him for these reasons. It was reissued in 2015. In 2010, Rolando was one of the "eight Bicentennial authors" of the Olmué Festival being represented by Las Cuatro Brujas.

On February 4, 2013, in commemoration of the 40th anniversary of the departure of the folklorist, a concert was held at the Mesón Nerudiano restaurant, Santiago, where musicians Eduardo Peralta, Rafael Manríquez, Felo, Marcos Acevedo, and Max Berrú participated. In that same year, the release of a tribute album entitled Tenemos las mismas manos, alluding to one of the verses of the song "Si somos americanos", with the participation of artists from the Nueva canción chilena and Neofolk, would be announced. A marathon recital in where 25 artists would performed compositions by Alarcón at Arrau home was held on August 5, 2019. In 2021, an anthology of unreleased recordings or out-of-print albums called Grabaciones perdidas was published exclusively through various streaming platforms such as Spotify, Deezer and YouTube Music.

== Discography ==
=== Studio albums ===
- Traditional Chilean Songs (Folkways Records) (1960; reissued in 1988 by Alerce label)
- Chile nuevo vol. 1 (1964; with Silvia Urbina)
- Rolando Alarcón y sus canciones (RCA Victor) (1965)
- La Peña De Los Parra (1965; with Patricio Manns, Isabel & Ángel Parra)
- Rolando Alarcón (RCA Victor) (1966)
- El Nuevo Rolando Alarcón (EMI Odeón Chilena) (1967)
- Canciones de la Guerra Civil Española (Astral) (1968)
- Voz para el camino (1968; with various artists)
- El Mundo Folklórico de Rolando Alarcón (Astral) (1969)
- A la Resistencia Española / A la Revolución Mexicana (1969; with Inti-Illimani)
- Por Cuba Y Vietnam (1969)
- El Hombre (1970)
- Chile ríe y canta (1970; with various artists)
- Canta a los Poetas Soviéticos (DICAP) (1971)
- Canciones Desde Una Prisión (1971)
- El alma de mi pueblo (1972)

=== Compilation albums ===
- Todo Rolando Alarcón (1998)
- Rolando Alarcón (2009)
- Grabaciones Perdidas (2021)
