= Amar de Nuevo (album) =

Amar De Nuevo (lit: Love again) is a 1998 album by Chilean Group Inti-Illimani, in which they explore the heritage of Latin American Creole music. It is the eighth studio album by Inti-Illimani.

== Track listing ==
1. Antes De Amar De Nuevo
2. Esta Eterna Costumbre
3. La Fiesta Eres Tu
4. La Indiferencia
5. Negra Presuntuosa
6. Entre Amor
7. El Faro
8. La Sombra
9. La Carta Del Adios
10. La Negrita
11. Corrido De La Soberbia
