= Inti-Illimani =

Chilean band

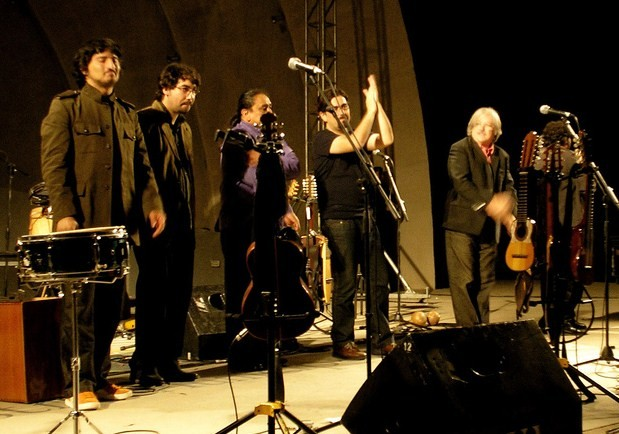
- Inti-Illimani Nuevo (New) performing on 26 February 2007 (left to right): Christián González, César Jara, Manuel Merino and Marcelo Coulón.

Background information
- Origin: Santiago, Chile
- Genres: Folk; Andean; protest; Latin; contemporary classical; avant-garde; world
- Years active: 1967–2004 (Inti-Illimani Histórico); 2004–present (Inti-Illimani Nuevo)
- Labels: EMI-Odeon; Picap; Warner; Xenophile
- Members: Horacio Salinas; José Seves; Horacio Durán; Jorge Coulón; Max Berrú; Marcelo Coulón; José Miguel Camus
- Past members: (1967–1973); Pedro Yáñez (director); Oscar Guzmán; Ciro Retamal; Ernesto Pérez de Arce; (1974–present); Renato Freyggang; Efren Viera; Daniel Cantillana; Manuel Meriño; Christian González; Juan Flores; Cesar Jara
- Website: Inti-illimani (R) website

Inti-Illimani (Spanish pronunciation: [in.ti.ji.ˈma.ni]; from Quechuan Inti and Aymara Illimani) are an instrumental and vocal Latin American folk music ensemble from Chile. The band was formed in 1967 by a group of university students and it acquired widespread popularity in Chile for their song Venceremos (We shall win!), which became the anthem of the Popular Unity government of Salvador Allende. When the 1973 Chilean coup d'état took place, they were on tour in Europe and were unable to return to their country where their music was proscribed by the ruling military junta of Augusto Pinochet. In Europe their music took on a multifarious character, incorporating elements of European baroque and other traditional music forms to their Latin American rhythms, creating a fusion of modern world music. Their name means 'Sun of the Golden Eagle' in Aymara.

== History ==
The group was formed by students at the Universidad Técnica del Estado at Santiago, Chile in 1967. In 1973 while they were on tour abroad, General Augusto Pinochet launched a coup d'état and took power. Having heard of the numerous extra-judicial killings of many fellow artists by Chile's army, they took up residence in Italy, resulting in "the longest tour in history" as they remained in exile. They continued their efforts supporting Chilean democracy internationally; magnitizdat copies of their work continued to be widely distributed in Chile. In September 1988, days after they were no longer banned from Chile, they began touring Chile again, supporting the "No" side during the 1988 Chilean national plebiscite.

In the past the group was musically led by Horacio Salinas and politically led by Jorge Coulon. However, in 2001 there was a controversial split of the group, which started when three key members left the group (José Seves, Horacio Durán and Horacio Salinas). They were replaced by Manuel Meriño (from Entrama), Cristián González and Juan Flores. Due to the importance of departed members, many called into question the ability of the remainder to carry on the Inti-Illimani name. Meanwhile, the three departed members started their own group they call Inti-Illimani Histórico. From 2005 onwards, there have been two groups.

== Membership ==
In August 1967 Inti-Illimani's earliest membership consisted of:

- Horacio Durán
- Jorge Coulón
- Luis Espinoza
- Oscar Guzmán
- Ciro Retamal
- Pedro Yáñez

In 1968 Inti-Illimani's membership consisted of:

- Horacio Salinas (musical director and main composer)
- Horacio Durán
- Max Berrú
- Jorge Coulon
- Ernesto Perez de Arce

Current line-up of the "Inti-Illimani Nuevo":

- Jorge Coulon
- Christian González
- Daniel Cantillana
- Juan Flores
- Efren Viera
- Marcelo Coulon
- Manuel Meriño
- César Jara

Current line-up of the "Inti-Histórico":

- Horacio Salinas
- Horacio Durán
- José Seves
- Jorge Ball
- Fernando Julio
- Camilo Salinas
- Danilo Donoso

Other members in the history of the group:

- Ernesto Pérez de Arce
- Homero Altamirano
- José Miguel Camus
- Renato Freyggang
- Pedro Villagra

== Discography ==
Albums

- Si Somos Americanos (1969)
- Voz para el camino (1969)
- Por la CUT (1969)
- A la Revolución Mexicana (1969)
- Inti Illimani (1969)
- Inti-Illimani (1970)
- Canto al Programa (1970)
- Charagua/El Aparecido (1971)
- Autores Chilenos (1971)
- Nuestro México, Febrero 23/Dolencias (1972)
- Canto para una Semilla (1972)
- Quebrada de Humahuaca/Taita Salasaca (1972)
- Canto de Pueblos Andinos, Vol. 1 (1973)
- Viva Chile! (1973)
- La Nueva Canción Chilena (Inti-Illimani 2) (1974)
- Canto de Pueblos Andinos (Inti-Illimani 3) (1975)
- Hacia La Libertad (Inti-Illimani 4) (1975)
- Canto de Pueblos Andinos, Vol. 2 (Inti-Illimani 5) (1976)
- Chile Resistencia (Inti-Illimani 6) (1977)
- Hart voor Chile (various artists) (1977)
- Canto per una Seme (1978) – Italian edition of Canto para una Semilla (1972)
- Canción para Matar una Culebra (1979)
- Jag Vill Tacka Livet (Gracias a la Vida) (1980)
- En Directo (1980)
- Palimpsesto (1981)
- The Flight of the Condor (1982)
- Con la Razón y la Fuerza (1982)
- Imaginación (1984)
- Sing to me the Dream (1984)
- Return of the Condor (1984)
- La Muerte no Va Conmigo (1985)
- De Canto y Baile (1986)
- Fragmentos de un Sueño (1987)
- Leyenda (1990)
- Andadas (1992)
- Arriesgaré la Piel (1996)
- Grandes Exitos (1997)
- Lejanía (1998)
- Amar de Nuevo (1999)
- Sinfónico (1999)
- La Rosa de los Vientos (1999)
- Inti-Illimani Interpreta a Víctor Jara (2000)
- Antología en Vivo (2001)
- Lugares Comunes (2002)

=== Inti-Illimani Histórico ===
- 2006 – Essential
- 2010 – Travesura (with Diego "el Cigala" and Ayllón )
- 2013 – Inti Illimani Histórico – Vivir En Libertad (ISBN 978-3-923445-73-8)
- 2014 – Inti-Illimani Histórico Canta a Manns

=== Live albums ===
- 2005 – Inti + Quila Música en la memoria (with Quilapayún)
- 2006 – Antología en vivo
- 2006 – Música en la Memoria – Juntos en Chile (with Quilapayún)
- 2012 – Eva + Inti (with Eva Ayllón)

=== Tribute albums ===
- 2009 – Inti-Illimani histórico. Tributo a su música
- 2009 – Tributo a Inti-Illimani Histórico. A la Salud de la Música

=== Inti-Illimani Nuevo (New) ===
- 2003 – Viva Italia
- 2006 – Pequeño Mundo
- 2010 – Meridiano
- 2014 – Teoría de cuerdas

=== Contributing artist ===
- The Rough Guide to the Music of the Andes (1996, World Music Network)
- Unwired: Latin America (2001, World Music Network)

== See also ==
- El pueblo unido jamás será vencido
