= Horacio Salinas =

Chilean musician

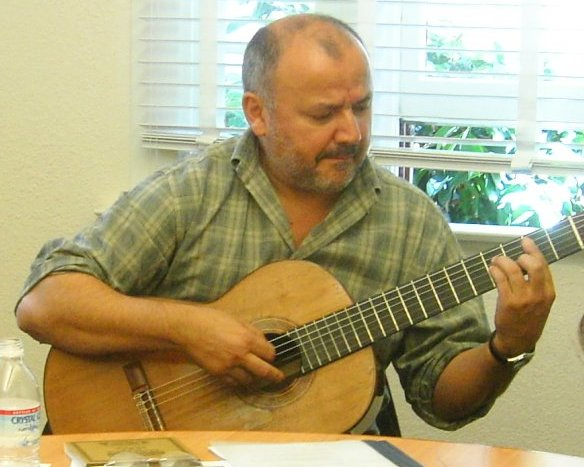
Horacio Salinas playing during a graduate seminar at UC Berkeley, 2005.

Horacio Salinas Álvarez (born 8 July 1951 in Lautaro, Cautín Province) is a Chilean guitarist and composer. He is cofounder and musical director of the Chilean group Inti-Illimani Histórico. He has a huge repertory of compositions that involves folk, Andean music, protest music, world music, contemporary classical music and many Latin American styles and fusions. In 1973, his group was touring in Europe when Augusto Pinochet seized power in Chile, after which they had to stay in exile for years. He has played with many international musicians notably the Australian classical guitarist John Williams.

== Discography ==
=== Solo ===
- La música de Horacio Salinas (1986 - Alerce)
- Trazos de cielo sur (1992 - Autoedición)
- Música para cine, vol. 1 (1997 - EMI Odeon)
- Remos en el agua (2003 - Warner Music)

=== As director of Inti-Illimani ===
- Si Somos Americanos - 1969
- Voz para el camino - 1969
- Por la CUT - 1969
- A la Revolución Mexicana - 1969
- Inti-Illimani - 1969
- Inti-Illimani - 1970
- Canto al Programa - 1970
- Autores Chilenos - 1971
- Canto para una Semilla - 1972
- Canto de Pueblos Andinos, Vol. 1 - 1973
- Viva Chile! - 1973
- La Nueva Canción Chilena (Inti-Illimani 2) - 1974
- Canto de Pueblos Andinos (Inti-Illimani 3) - 1975
- Hacia La Libertad (Inti-Illimani 4) - 1975
- Canto de Pueblos Andinos, Vol. 2 (Inti-Illimani 5) - 1976
- Chile Resistencia (Inti-Illimani 6) - 1977
- Canto per una Seme - 1978
- Canto para una Semilla - 1978
- Canción para Matar una Culebra - 1979
- Jag Vill Tacka Livet (Gracias a la Vida) - 1980 (con Arja Saijonmaa)
- En Directo - 1980
- Palimpsesto - 1981
- The Flight of the Condor - 1982
- Con la Razón y la Fuerza - 1982 (con Patricio Manns)
- Imaginación - 1984
- Sing to me the Dream - 1984 (con Holly Near)
- Return of the Condor - 1984
- La Muerte no Va Conmigo - 1985 (con Patricio Manns)
- De Canto y Baile - 1986
- Fragmentos de un Sueño - 1987 (con John Williams y Paco Peña)
- Leyenda - 1990 (con John Williams y Paco Peña)
- Andadas - 1992
- Arriesgare la Piel - 1996
- Lejanía - 1998
- Amar de Nuevo - 1999
- Sinfónico - 1999
- La Rosa de los Vientos - 1999
- Inti-illimani Interpreta a Víctor Jara - 2000
- Antología en Vivo - 2000
- Inti-Quila. Música en la Memoria. Juntos en Chile - 2005 Inti-Illimani Histórico
- Antología en vivo - 2006 Inti-Illimani Histórico
- Esencial - 2006 Inti-Illimani Histórico
- Tributo a Inti-Illimani Histórico. A la Salud de la Música - 2009 (Obra Colectiva) Inti-Illimani Histórico
