= ¿Quién es la máscara? (Chilean TV series) =

Chilean talent reality television series

- Genre: Reality competition
- Based on: King of Mask Singer by MBC Entertainment
- Directed by: Carlos Valencia
- Presented by: Julián Elfenbein
- Judges: Cristián Riquelme; Cristián Sánchez; María Elena Swett; Macarena Pizarro
- Opening theme: "Who Are You" by The Who
- Country of origin: Chile
- Original language: Spanish
- No. of seasons: 3
- No. of episodes: 30

Production
- Camera setup: Multiple-camera
- Running time: 100 minutes
- Production company: ViacomCBS Networks Americas

Original release
- Network: Chilevisión
- Release: 1 November 2021 – 19 January 2022

¿Quién es la máscara? (Spanish: Who Is the Mask?) is a Chilean reality singing competition television series based on the South Korean television series King of Mask Singer. The first season premiered on 1 November 2021, and concluded on 28 November 2021. The second season premiered on 29 November 2021, and concluded on 21 December 2021. The third season premiered on 27 December 2021, and concluded on 19 January 2022.

The show features celebrities singing songs while wearing head-to-toe costumes and face masks concealing their identities. It employs panelists who guess the celebrities' identities by interpreting clues provided to them throughout the series.

== Overview ==
=== Host and panelists ===
Journalist Julián Elfenbein was announced as the main host of the program while, the announced panelists consist of actor Cristián Riquelme, presenter Cristián Sánchez, actress María Elena Swett, and journalist Macarena Pizarro.

=== Format ===
Twelve celebrities compete in costumes to hide their identities. In each episode, the competitors are divided into duels or otherwise, in which each one performs a song of their choice. In each confrontation, the audience in the studio votes and the winner of those fights remains in competition, while the loser is at risk. At the end of each episode, the losers or masks at risk face off by singing and the panelists determine who will be unmasked and who will stay in the running. The eliminated celebrity will then remove their mask to reveal their identity.

== Season 1 ==
Results
Stage name	Celebrity	Occupation(s)	Episodes									
Stage name	Celebrity	Occupation(s)	1	2	3	4	5	6	7	8	9	10
Muñeca	Daniela Castillo	Singer		RISK		RISK	RISK	SAFE	RISK	SAFE	RISK	WINNER
Rata	Jean Philippe Cretton	Presenter	WIN			WIN	SAFE	SAFE	WIN	SAFE	WIN	RUNNER-UP
Cigüeña	Natalia Cuevas	Comedian	WIN		WIN		SAFE	RISK	WIN	RISK	WIN	THIRD
Sapo	DJ Méndez	DJ and singer		RISK		WIN	SAFE	SAFE	RISK	SAFE	OUT	
Flor	Mónica Aguirre	Model		WIN	RISK		SAFE	SAFE	WIN	OUT		
Avispa	Emilia Daiber	TV Host		WIN	WIN		SAFE	SAFE	OUT			
Piña	Américo	Singer		WIN	WIN		SAFE	OUT				
Indio Pícaro	Cristián Pérez	DJ	RISK			WIN	OUT					
Flamenco	Raquel Argandoña	Presenter	WIN			OUT						
Burro	Paul Vásquez	Comedian	RISK		OUT							
Pop Corn	María Eugenia Larraín	Model		OUT								
Monstruo	Jorge Valdivia	Footballer	OUT									

=== Week 1 (1 and 2 November) ===
Performances on the first episode
#	Stage name	Song	Result	
1	Cigüeña	"Él Me Mintió" by Amanda Miguel	WIN	
2	Indio Pícaro	"Agua Que No Has de Beber" by Sonora Palacios	RISK	
3	Monstruo	"Dança Da Manivela" by Axé Bahia	RISK	
4	Rata	"Soldado del amor" by Mijares	WIN	
5	Burro	"Torero" by Chayanne	RISK	
6	Flamenco	"Caliente, Caliente" by Rafaella Carrá	WIN	
Máscara vs. Máscara			Identity	Result
1	Indio Pícaro	"Como Yo Te Amo" by Raphael	undisclosed	SAFE
2	Monstruo	"La Parabólica" by La Sonora Dinamita	Jorge Valdivia	OUT

Performances on the second episode
#	Stage name	Song	Result	
1	Piña	"Noa Noa" by Juan Gabriel	WIN	
2	Pop Corn	"Miénteme" by Tini & María Becerra	RISK	
3	Flor	"Herida" by Myriam Hernández	WIN	
4	Sapo	"La Gozadera" by Gente de Zona	RISK	
5	Muñeca	"Fiesta" by Raffaella Carrà	RISK	
6	Avispa	"Ilariê" by Xuxa	WIN	
Máscara vs. Máscara			Identity	Result
1	Pop Corn	"Me Gusta Todo de Ti" by Banda el Recodo	María Eugenia Larraín	OUT
2	Sapo	"Daniela" by La Sonora Dinamita	undisclosed	SAFE

=== Week 2 (7, 8, and 9 November) ===
Performances on the third episode
#	Stage name	Song	Result	
1	Flor	"Amor Prohibido" by Selena	RISK	
2	Avispa	"Hay Un Límite" by Aleste	WIN	
3	Burro	"La Medallita" by Chico Trujillo	RISK	
4	Cigüeña	"Congelao" by Cachureos	WIN	
5	Piña	"Adrenalina" by Wisin feat. Ricky Martin & Jennifer López	WIN	
Máscara vs. Máscara			Identity	Result
1	Burro	"Robarte un Beso" by Carlos Vives & Sebastián Yatra	Paul Vásquez	OUT
2	Flor	"Sopa de Caracol" by Banda Blanca	undisclosed	SAFE

Performances on the fourth episode
#	Stage name	Song	Result	
1	Sapo	"Chica de Humo" by Emmanuel	WIN	
2	Flamenco	"Macarena" by Los del Río	RISK	
3	Indio Pícaro	"Azul" by Cristian Castro	WIN	
4	Muñeca	"Qué Te Pasa" by Yuri	RISK	
5	Rata	"Hawái" by Maluma	WIN	
Máscara vs. Máscara			Identity	Result
1	Flamenco	"Fresa Salvaje" by Camilo Sesto	Raquel Argandoña	OUT
2	Muñeca	"...Baby One More Time" by Britney Spears	undisclosed	SAFE

Performances on the fifth episode
#	Stage name	Song	Identity	Result
1	Piña	"Mi prisionera" by Zalo Reyes	undisclosed	SAFE
2	Indio Pícaro	"El Taxi" by Pitbull feat. Sensato & Osmani García	Cristian Pérez	OUT
3	Flor	"Inevitable" by Shakira	undisclosed	SAFE
4	Cigüeña	"Ay, Dios Mio!" by Karol G	undisclosed	SAFE
5	Muñeca	"Puré de Papas" by Cecilia Pantoja	undisclosed	RISK
6	Avispa	"No Me Acuerdo" by Thalía & Natti Natasha	undisclosed	SAFE
7	Rata	"Loco Vox" by Locomía	undisclosed	SAFE
8	Sapo	"Mayor Que Yo" by Wisin & Yandel	undisclosed	SAFE

=== Week 3 (14 & 15 November) ===
Performances on the sixth episode
#	Stage name	Song	Identity	Result
1	Avispa	"Eres" by Massiel	undisclosed	SAFE
2	Cigüeña	"El Hombre Casado Sabe Más Bueno" by Garibaldi	undisclosed	RISK
3	Sapo	"Amante Bandido" by Miguel Bosé	undisclosed	SAFE
4	Rata	"Una Cerveza" by Ráfaga	undisclosed	SAFE
5	Flor	"La Bilirrubina" by Juan Luis Guerra	undisclosed	SAFE
6	Piña	"Dura" by Daddy Yankee	Américo	OUT
7	Muñeca	"Piel Morena" by Thalía	undisclosed	SAFE

Performances on the seventh episode
#	Stage name	Song	Result	
1	Cigüeña	"Libre" by Paloma San Basilio	WIN	
2	Muñeca	"Muñequita" by Luis Dimas	RISK	
3	Avispa	"Quién Como Tú" by Ana Gabriel	RISK	
4	Flor	"Celos" by Daniela Romo	WIN	
5	Rata	"Juana María" by Los Vásquez	WIN	
6	Sapo	"Pepas" by Farruko	RISK	
Máscara vs. Máscara			Identity	Result
1	Avispa	"Voy En Un Coche" by Christina Rosenvinge	Emilia Daiber	OUT
2	Muñeca	"Criminal" by Natti Natasha & Ozuna	undisclosed	SAFE

=== Week 4 (22 and 23 November) ===
Performances on the eighth episode
#	Stage name	Song	Result	
1	Rata	"La Guitarra" by Los Autenticos Decadentes	SAFE	
2	Cigüeña	"Libre Soy" by Carmen Sarahí	RISK	
3	Muñeca	"Paisaje" by Franco Simone	SAFE	
4	Flor	"Para Hacen Bien El Amor" by Raffaella Carrá	RISK	
5	Sapo	"La Fiesta" by José Luis Rodríguez	SAFE	
Máscara vs. Máscara			Identity	Result
1	Flor	"Mi Primer Millón" by Bacilos	Monica Aguirre	OUT
2	Cigüeña	"La Vida Es Un Carnaval" by Celia Cruz	undisclosed	SAFE

Performances on the ninth episode
#	Stage name	Song	Result	
1	Sapo	"Ahora Te Puedes Marchar" by Luis Miguel	RISK	
2	Cigüeña	"Tu Falta de Querer" by Mon Laferte	WIN	
3	Muñeca	"Oye!" by Gloria Estefan	RISK	
4	Rata	"El Conductor" by Chico Trujillo	WIN	
Máscara vs. Máscara			Identity	Result
1	Sapo	"Livin' la Vida Loca" by Ricky Martin	DJ Méndez	OUT
2	Muñeca	"Estrechez De Corazón" by Los Prisioneros	undisclosed	SAFE

=== Week 5 (28 November) ===
Performances on the tenth episode
#	Stage name	Song	Identity	Result
1	Cigüeña	"Escándalo" by Raphael	Natalia Cuevas	THIRD
2	Rata	"De Boliche en Boliche" by Los Náufragos	undisclosed	SAFE
3	Muñeca	"No me arrepiento de este amor" by Gilda	undisclosed	SAFE
Máscara vs. Máscara			Identity	Result
1	Rata	"Boquita De Caramelo" by Los Viking's 5	Jean Philippe Cretton	RUNNER-UP
2	Muñeca	"Como la Flor" by Selena	Daniela Castillo	WINNER

== Season 2 ==
Results
Stage name	Celebrity	Occupation(s)	Episodes									
Stage name	Celebrity	Occupation(s)	1	2	3	4	5	6	7	8	9	10
Panda	Fernanda Hansen	Journalist		WIN		WIN	SAFE	SAFE	RISK	SAFE	WIN	WINNER
Puma	Quique Neira	Singer	RISK			WIN	SAFE	SAFE	RISK	RISK	WIN	RUNNER-UP
Bola Disco	Leo Rey	Singer	WIN			RISK	SAFE	SAFE	WIN	SAFE	RISK	THIRD
Tiburón	Pablo Herrera	Singer		WIN	RISK		SAFE	RISK	WIN	SAFE	OUT	
Boca	Katherine Orellana	Singer		RISK	WIN		SAFE	SAFE	WIN	OUT		
Unicornio	Eva Gómez	Journalist	WIN		WIN		SAFE	SAFE	OUT			
Cangrejo	Gigi Martin	Comedian		RISK		WIN	RISK	OUT				
Banana	Patricio Torres	Actor	RISK		WIN		OUT					
Calavera	Cristina Tocco	Actress	WIN			OUT						
Choripán	Mauricio Pinilla	Former Footballer		WIN	OUT							
Helada	Javiera Acevedo	Actress		OUT								
Pelos	Juan Falcón	Actor	OUT									

=== Week 1 (29 & 30 November) ===
Performances on the first episode
#	Stage name	Song	Identity	Result
1	Puma	"Perdóname" by Camilo Sesto	undisclosed	RISK
2	Unicornio	"Mayores" by Becky G feat. Bad Bunny	undisclosed	WIN
3	Calavera	"Eternamente Bella" by Alejandra Guzmán	undisclosed	WIN
4	Pelos	"Agárrense de Las Manos" by José Luis Rodríguez	Juan Falcón	OUT
5	Bola Disco	"Será Que No Me Amas" by Luis Miguel	undisclosed	WIN
6	Banana	"Banana" by Garibaldi	undisclosed	RISK

Performances on the second episode
#	Stage name	Song	Identity	Result
1	Panda	"Así Fue" by Juan Gabriel	WIN	
2	Cangrejo	"Bella" by Manuel Mijares	RISK	
3	Helada	"Dame Luz" by Nicole	RISK	
4	Choripán	"Gran Pecador" by Chico Trujillo	WIN	
5	Tiburón	"Resistiré" by Dúo Dinámico	WIN	
6	Boca	"Dame un beso" by Yuri	RISK	
Máscara vs. Máscara			Identity	Result
1	Helada	"Maldito amor" by Supernova	Javiera Acevedo	OUT
2	Cangrejo	"El Rey" by Vicente Fernández	undisclosed	SAFE

=== Week 2 (5, 6, & 7 December) ===
Performances on the third episode
#	Stage name	Song	Result	
1	Unicornio	"Ahora Te Puedes Marchar" by Luis Miguel	WIN	
2	Choripán	"Eres Exquisita" by Los Ramblers	RISK	
3	Boca	"Tan Enamorados" by Ricardo Montaner	WIN	
4	Banana	"Párate y Mira" by Los Pericos	WIN	
5	Tiburón	"Sin Documentos" by Los Rodríguez	RISK	
Máscara vs. Máscara			Identity	Result
1	Choripán	"La Bamba" by Los Lobos	Mauricio Pinilla	OUT
2	Tiburón	"Tiburón A La Vista" by Mike Laure	undisclosed	SAFE

Performances on the fourth episode
#	Stage name	Song	Result	
1	Calavera	"Bailar Pegados" by Sergio Dalma	RISK	
2	Panda	"Hombres al Borde de un Ataque de Celos" by Yuri	WIN	
3	Cangrejo	"Bajo El Mar" by Samuel E. Wright	WIN	
4	Bola Disco	"Ramito de Violetas" by Zalo Reyes	RISK	
5	Puma	"Pose" by Daddy Yankee	WIN	
Máscara vs. Máscara			Identity	Result
1	Calavera	"Yo No Te Pido La Luna" by Daniela Romo	Cristina Tocco	OUT
2	Bola Disco	"Noche de Sexo" by Wisin & Yandel ft. Romeo Santos	undisclosed	SAFE

Performances on the fifth episode
#	Stage name	Song	Identity	Result
1	Boca	"Hoy Quiero Confesarme" by Isabel Pantoja	undisclosed	SAFE
2	Panda	"Mi Gran Noche" by Raphael	undisclosed	SAFE
3	Tiburón	"Suavemente" by Elvis Crespo	undisclosed	SAFE
4	Banana	"Para Amarnos Más" by Manuel Mijares	Patricio Torres	OUT
5	Unicornio	"Mujer Contra Mujer" by Mecano	undisclosed	SAFE
6	Puma	"Pavo Real" by Jose Luis Rodriguez	undisclosed	SAFE
7	Cangrejo	"Y Volveré" by Los Ángeles Negros	undisclosed	RISK
8	Bola Disco	"Mueve Mueve" by Juan Antonio Labra	undisclosed	SAFE

=== Week 3 (12, 13 & 14 December) ===
Performances on the sixth episode
#	Stage name	Song	Identity	Result
1	Bola Disco	"Puerto Montt" by Los Iracundos	undisclosed	SAFE
2	Tiburón	"Todo a Pulmón" by Alejandro Lerner	undisclosed	RISK
3	Boca	"La Ventanita" by Garibaldi	undisclosed	SAFE
4	Unicornio	"Tiempo de Vals" by Chayanne	undisclosed	SAFE
5	Puma	"Allá en el Rancho Grande" by Jorge Negrete	undisclosed	SAFE
6	Cangrejo	"Mentirosa" by Ráfaga	Gigi Martin	OUT
7	Panda	"Vogue" by Madonna	undisclosed	SAFE

Performances on the seventh episode
#	Stage name	Song	Result	
1	Unicornio	"¿A quién le importa?" by Thalía	RISK	
2	Bola Disco	"Amiga" by Miguel Bosé	WIN	
3	Boca	"Vivir Así es Morir de Amor" by Camilo Sesto	WIN	
4	Panda	"Me Cuesta Tanto Olvidarte" by Mecano	RISK	
5	Tiburón	"Como Dejar de Amarte" by Los Charros de Lumaco	WIN	
6	Puma	"Palabra de Honor" by Luis Miguel	RISK	
Máscara vs. Máscara			Identity	Result
1	Unicornio	"Burbujas de Amor" by Juan Luis Guerra	Eva Gómez	OUT
2	Panda	"Arena y Sol" by Marta Sánchez	undisclosed	SAFE

Performances on the eighth episode
#	Stage name	Song	Identity	Result
1	Boca	"Te Amo, Te Amo" by Franco Simone	undisclosed	RISK
2	Tiburón	"Si Tú No Vuelves" by Miguel Bosé	undisclosed	SAFE
3	Panda	"Yo No Soy Esa Mujer" by Paulina Rubio	undisclosed	SAFE
4	Puma	"La Voz de los '80" by Los Prisioneros	undisclosed	RISK
5	Bola Disco	"Corazón" by Los Auténticos Decadentes	undisclosed	SAFE
Máscara vs. Máscara			Identity	Result
1	Boca	"Solo Se Vive Una Vez" by Azúcar Moreno	Katherine Orellana	OUT
2	Puma	"Yo No Fui" by Pedro Fernández	undisclosed	SAFE

=== Week 4 (20 & 21 December) ===
Performances on the ninth episode
#	Stage name	Song	Result	
1	Bola Disco	"Me Dediqué a Perderte" by Alejandro Fernández	RISK	
2	Puma	"Hasta Que Te Conocí" by Juan Gabriel	WIN	
3	Tiburón	"Provócame" by Chayanne	RISK	
4	Panda	"La Quiero a Morir" by Francis Cabrel	WIN	
Máscara vs. Máscara			Identity	Result
1	Tiburón	"Sexo" by Los Prisioneros	Pablo Herrera	OUT
2	Bola Disco	"Las Seis" by Joe Vasconcellos	undisclosed	SAFE

Performances on the tenth episode
#	Stage name	Song	Identity	Result
1	Panda	"Canción Bonita" by Carlos Vives & Ricky Martin	undisclosed	SAFE
2	Bola Disco	"En Carne Viva" by Raphael	Leo Rey	THIRD
3	Puma	"Fiesta En América" by Chayanne	undisclosed	SAFE
Máscara vs. Máscara			Identity	Result
1	Puma	"Un Beso y una Flor" by Nino Bravo	Quique Neira	RUNNER-UP
2	Panda	"Volver Volver" by Vicente Fernández	Fernanda Hansen	WINNER

== Season 3 ==
Results
Stage name	Celebrity	Occupation(s)	Episodes									
Stage name	Celebrity	Occupation(s)	1	2	3	4	5	6	7	8	9	10
Conejo	Kanela	Singer	WIN		WIN		SAFE	SAFE	RISK	SAFE	RISK	WINNER
Caperuza	Denisse Malebrán	Singer		WIN		RISK	SAFE	SAFE	RISK	RISK	WIN	RUNNER-UP
Guagua	Christell	Singer		RISK		WIN	SAFE	RISK	WIN	SAFE	WIN	THIRD
Lechuza	Carolina Soto	Singer	WIN		RISK		RISK	SAFE	WIN	SAFE	OUT	
Cleogata	María Jimena Pereyra	Singer	RISK		WIN		SAFE	SAFE	WIN	OUT		
Abuelo	Eduardo Ibeas	Singer	WIN			WIN	SAFE	SAFE	OUT			
Cóndor	Mauricio Flores	Comedian		WIN	WIN		SAFE	OUT				
Pitbull	Leo Caprile	TV Host	RISK			WIN	OUT					
Reinetita	Macarena Tondreau	Actress		RISK		OUT						
Mono	Mark González	Former Footballer		WIN	OUT							
Escoba	Benjamín Vicuña	Actor		OUT								
Huevo	Víctor Díaz	Influencer	OUT									

=== Week 1 (27 & 28 December) ===
Performances on the first episode
#	Stage name	Song	Identity	Result
1	Lechuza	"Déjame Llorar" by Ricardo Montaner	undisclosed	WIN
2	Cleogata	"La Gata Bajo La Lluvia" by Rocío Dúrcal	undisclosed	RISK
3	Abuelo	"Yo Sólo Quiero (Un Millón de Amigos)" by Roberto Carlos	undisclosed	WIN
4	Pitbull	"Caramelo de Menta" by Lalo Valenzuela	undisclosed	RISK
5	Huevo	"La Rubia En El Avion" by Christian Puga & Los Ladrones Sueltos	Víctor Díaz	OUT
6	Conejo	"Querida" by Juan Gabriel	undisclosed	WIN

Performances on the second episode
#	Stage name	Song	Identity	Result
1	Caperuza	"¿Lo Ves?" by Alejandro Sanz	WIN	
2	Reinetita	"Ese Hombre" by Rocío Jurado	RISK	
3	Escoba	"De Música Ligera" by Soda Stereo	RISK	
4	Mono	"Paramar" by Los Prisioneros	WIN	
5	Guagua	"Quién Como Tú" by Ana Gabriel	RISK	
4	Cóndor	"Que Levante La Mano" by Los Ángeles de Charly	WIN	
Máscara vs. Máscara			Identity	Result
1	Escoba	"Flaca" by Andrés Calamaro	Benjamín Vicuña	OUT
2	Guagua	"Se fue" by Laura Pausini	undisclosed	SAFE

=== Week 2 (9, 10, 11 & 12 January) ===
Performances on the third episode
#	Stage name	Song	Result	
1	Mono	"Morir de Amor" by Miguel Bosé	RISK	
2	Lechuza	"Porque te vas" by Jeanette	RISK	
3	Cleogata	"Será" by Ricardo Montaner	WIN	
4	Conejo	"La Bikina" by Luis Miguel	WIN	
5	Cóndor	"El Rock De La Cárcel" by Los Teen Tops	WIN	
Máscara vs. Máscara			Identity	Result
1	Mono	"Libre, Solterito y Sin Nadie" by Leo Dan	Mark González	OUT
2	Lechuza	"Mentiras" by Daniela Romo	undisclosed	SAFE

Performances on the fourth episode
#	Stage name	Song	Result	
1	Caperuza	"La maldita primavera" by Yuri	RISK	
2	Abuelo	"Que Nadie Se Entere" by La Noche	WIN	
3	Reinetita	"Yo No Soy Esa" by Mari Trini	RISK	
4	Guagua	"Entre el mar y una estrella" by Thalía	WIN	
5	Pitbull	"Te Quiero" by José Luis Perales	WIN	
Máscara vs. Máscara			Identity	Result
1	Reinetita	"Fuiste" by Gilda	Macarena Tondreau	OUT
2	Caperuza	"Amárrame" by Mon Laferte ft. Juanes	undisclosed	SAFE

Performances on the fifth episode
#	Stage name	Song	Identity	Result
1	Abuelo	"Completamente Enamorados" by Chayanne	undisclosed	SAFE
2	Lechuza	"Como Tu Mujer" by Rocío Dúrcal	undisclosed	RISK
3	Caperuza	"No Te Enamores" by Paloma Mami	undisclosed	SAFE
4	Conejo	"¿Ahora Quién?" by Marc Anthony	undisclosed	SAFE
5	Pitbull	"Soy un Truhán, Soy un Señor" by Julio Iglesias	Leo Caprile	OUT
6	Guagua	"Corazón Partío" by Alejandro Sanz	undisclosed	SAFE
7	Cóndor	"Cuando Nos Volvamos a Encontrar" by Carlos Vives ft. Marc Anthony	undisclosed	SAFE
8	Cleogata	"Te Amaré" by Miguel Bosé	undisclosed	SAFE

Performances on the sixth episode
#	Stage name	Song	Identity	Result
1	Conejo	"¿Por Qué Te Tengo Que Olvidar?" by José Feliciano	undisclosed	SAFE
2	Caperuza	"Cariño Mío" by Ángela Carrasco	undisclosed	SAFE
3	Guagua	"Mío" by Paulina Rubio	undisclosed	RISK
4	Cóndor	"Una Lágrima En La Garganta" by Zalo Reyes	Mauricio Flores	OUT
5	Cleogata	"Ojos Así" by Shakira	undisclosed	SAFE
6	Abuelo	"Cuando Calienta el Sol" by Luis Miguel	undisclosed	SAFE
7	Lechuza	"Luna" by Ana Gabriel	undisclosed	SAFE

=== Week 3 (16, 17, 18, & 19 January) ===
Performances on the seventh episode
#	Stage name	Song	Result	
1	Caperuza	"El Día Que Me Quieras" by Carlos Gardel	RISK	
2	Lechuza	"Ven Conmigo" by Christina Aguilera	WIN	
3	Conejo	"Te Conozco" by Ricardo Arjona	RISK	
4	Guagua	"Waka Waka" by Shakira feat. Freshlyground	WIN	
5	Cleogata	"¿Cómo Te Va Mi Amor?" by Pandora	WIN	
6	Abuelo	"Bailando" by Enrique Iglesias	RISK	
Máscara vs. Máscara			Identity	Result
1	Abuelo	"Pero Qué Necesidad" by Juan Gabriel	Eduardo Ibeas	OUT
2	Conejo	"Volví a Nacer" by Carlos Vives	undisclosed	SAFE

Performances on the eighth episode
#	Stage name	Song	Result	
1	Lechuza	"Gracias a la Vida" by Violeta Parra	SAFE	
2	Conejo	"La Incondicional" by Luis Miguel	SAFE	
3	Caperuza	"Yo te amo, te amo" by Yuri	RISK	
4	Cleogata	"¿Quieres ser Mi Amante?" by Camilo Sesto	RISK	
5	Guagua	"Tu Veneno" by Natalia Oreiro	SAFE	
Máscara vs. Máscara			Identity	Result
1	Cleogata	"Tusa" by Karol G and Nicki Minaj	María Jimena Pereyra	OUT
2	Caperuza	"Una Noche Más" by Jennifer Lopez	undisclosed	SAFE

Performances on the ninth episode
#	Stage name	Song	Result	
1	Conejo	"Dueño de Nada" by José Luis Rodríguez	RISK	
2	Caperuza	"Huele a Peligro" by Myriam Hernández	WIN	
3	Lechuza	"Mi Tierra" by Gloria Estefan	RISK	
4	Guagua	"Veleta" by Lucero	WIN	
Máscara vs. Máscara			Identity	Result
1	Lechuza	"Sin Pijama" by Becky G and Natti Natasha	Carolina Soto	OUT
2	Conejo	"Propuesta Indecente" by Romeo Santos	undisclosed	SAFE

Performances on the tenth episode
#	Stage name	Song	Identity	Result
1	Caperuza	"Quiero amanecer con alguien" by Daniela Romo	undisclosed	SAFE
2	Conejo	"¿Y cómo es él?" by José Luis Perales	undisclosed	SAFE
3	Guagua	"Pareja del Año" by Sebastián Yatra and Myke Towers	Christell	THIRD
Máscara vs. Máscara			Identity	Result
1	Conejo	"Gasolina" by Daddy Yankee feat. Glory	Kanela	WINNER
2	Caperuza	"La joya del Pacífico" by Joe Vasconcellos	Denisse Malebrán	RUNNER-UP
