= 2010 Viña del Mar International Song Festival =

- Presented by: Soledad Onetto; Felipe Camiroaga
- Country of origin: Chile

Production
- Production locations: Viña del Mar, Chile
- Running time: 270 minutes

Original release
- Network: Canal 13, TVN, A&E
- Release: February 22 – February 26, 2010

The Viña del Mar International Song Festival 2010 was held from February 22, 2010, until Friday February 26, 2010. The musical event was broadcast on Chilean TV channels Televisión Nacional de Chile and Canal 13, and will be held in Viña del Mar, Chile, like the past 50 editions. The show is hosted for the second time by Soledad Onetto and Felipe Camiroaga. For the first time the whole event was broadcast in HD (High Definition) via Canal 13.

The last day on February 27, 2010, of the festival was canceled due to the 2010 Chile earthquake.

== Background ==
For the first time, the people participated in the choice of the song that represents Chile in the international competition via text message which chose 5 songs. In a ceremony on November 28, 2009, a judges chose the finalist, which was "El Tiempo en La Bastillas" by Difuntos Correa, originally performed by Fernando Ubiergo, the song received 18,32% of the people votes.

The Organization of the event began in mid-2009 with initial discussions with producers, among the first artists that were proposed included, Shakira, Makano, Julio Iglesias, Myriam Hernández. During November 2009, artists such as Beyoncé, Miley Cyrus, Jonas Brothers, Tina Turner, Ashley Tisdale, Alicia Keys, Alejandro Sanz and Maná were named as possible in the event.

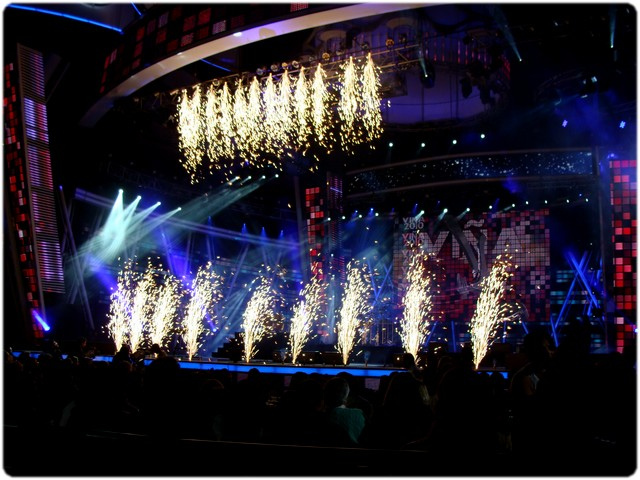
Oberture of the festival.

Canadian singer Paul Anka, Latin Grammy-winning Mexican band Reik, Chilean tropical sensation Américo y La Nueva Alegría, reggaeton performer Tito El Bambino and the humorist Coco Legrand were the first artists confirmed to attend the 51st edition of the festival. On December 3, 2009, three new acts were confirmed for the main show, Ricardo Arjona, Spanish singer Raphael, Argentine electropop band Miranda!, Latin Grammy Award-nominated Reggaetón singer Don Omar, humorist Bombo Fica and part of the judges the ex-RBD, Anahí and La Ley former Beto Cuevas. On December 4, 2009, Los Fabulosos Cadillacs and La Noche were confirmed to perform at the show, and La Noche's leader Leo Rey, Los Nocheros' member Jorge Rojas for judges in the international and folklore competition respectively, along with the Colombian pop revelation Fanny Lu.

On December 8, 2009, several rumors of possible participation of the Grammy-nominated American singer Katy Perry on the show were commented by the press, her presence was to be part of the international judgers and in the main show, but it was denied. On December 15, 2009, defined the order of the first artists confirmed, which were distributed in six nights. Controversy caused that Peru was excluded of the folk competence, especially for the last difficulties in the Chile-Peru relations in 2009. Finally on December 17, 2009, the problem was fixed and Peru gets a space in the international competition, but not in the folk competition, because was just included countries that during 2010 celebrates their bicentennial of independence.

Chilean humorist Coco Legrand extraordinaire was awarded with two gold torches for the first time in the history of the festival. The queen of the festival was chosen the Chilean actresses Carolina Arregui, representing the international jury and Canal 13, was elected by 94 votes of the press and the runner-up model Carla Ochoa who was second by 93 votes. Américo was special awarded by the public with 2 silver seagulls and was elected as King of the festival, in second place Beto Cuevas.

Argentina won the folk competition with the song "El Cantar es Andar" interpreted by Canto 4.

== Performers ==
- Américo y La Nueva Alegría
- Anahí
- Bombo Fica
- Coco Legrand
- Don Omar
- La Noche
- Miranda!
- Paul Anka
- Raphael
- Reik
- Ricardo Arjona
- Fanny Lu
- Tito El Bambino

== Canceled 2010 Chile earthquake Artist ==
- Los Fabulosos Cadillacs
- Beto Cuevas
- Los Jaivas

== Judges ==
=== International competition ===
- Anahí
- Beto Cuevas
- Fanny Lu
- Leo Rey
- Rafael Araneda
- Carolina Arregui
- Gabriela Vergara

Notes

- Anahí and Fanny Lu performed live during the main show, Beto Cuevas' performance was cancelled due to the earthquake.

=== Folk competition ===
- Jorge Rojas
- Yolanda Rayo
- Verónica Franco
- Patricia López
- Sigrid Alegría

== Chronology ==
Day 1
Artist	Show/Songs Performed	Notes	Recognitions	Rating
Coco Legrand	● Humoristic show	For first time a non-music show opens the festival. His show was the peak rating, marking a peak of tuning in Canal 13 of 40 points and TVN of 25, adding a total of 65 points rating online as peak during his routine.	● Silver Torch ● Golden Torch ● Golden Torch ● Silver Seagull	22.7 17.7 Viewers: 4 millions
Valentín Trujillo	● Tribute	Chilean musician, honored for his artistic career	● Silver Torch ● Golden Torch ● Silver Seagull	22.7 17.7 Viewers: 4 millions
Paul Anka	● "Diana" ● "Times of Your Life" ● "Jump" ● "(You're) Having My Baby" ● "Crazy Love" ● "This Is It" ● "Put Your Head on My Shoulder" ● "Lonely Boy" ● "Eso Beso (That Kiss)" ● "She's a Lady" ● "Let Me Try Again" ● "Smells Like Teen Spirit" ● "I'm Not Anyone" ● "My Way" ● "New York, New York"	Anka performed "This Is It" along with Michael Jackson which was reproduced on the giant screens of the stage as a posthumous tribute. He sang Frank Sinatra's signature songs "My Way", "Let Me Try Again", "New York, New York" and Tom Jones' "She's a Lady", both lyrics of this songs were written by Anka. He covered "Jump" by Van Halen and "Smells Like Teen Spirit" by Nirvana.	● Silver Torch ● Golden Torch ● Silver Seagull	22.7 17.7 Viewers: 4 millions
Day 2
Artist	Show/Songs Performed	Notes	Recognitions	Rating
Magic Twins	● Magic show	Overture of the night and presentation of the hosts in one of the magic numbers.	● Silver Torch	19.2 16.2 Viewers: 3.5 millions
Reik	● "Inolvidable" ● "Niña" ● "Noviembre Sin Ti" ● "Invierno" ● "Me Duele Amarte" ● "Sabes" ● "Yo Quisiera" ● "Fui" ● "Qué Vida La Mía" ● "No Desaparecerá"	They performed a special acoustic version of their song "Fui".	● Silver Torch ● Golden Torch	19.2 16.2 Viewers: 3.5 millions
Anahí	● "Mi Delirio" ● "Sálvame" ● "Un Poco de Tu Amor" ● "Tras De Mi" ● "Desapareció" ● "El Me Mintió"	She performed "Sálvame" with a mix of other original songs recorded with RBD. In the performance of "El Me Mintió", she wore a wedding dress with knives in her back and blood, simulating the Lady Gaga's "Paparazzi" live performance for the 2009 MTV Video Music Awards. Her presentation of "El Me Mintió" was the most viewed moment of the night with 45 tuning rating points.		19.2 16.2 Viewers: 3.5 millions
Don Omar	● "Blue Zone" ● "Galactic Blues" ● "Ciao Bella" ● "Virtual Diva" ● "Sexy Robótica" ● "Flow Natural" ● "El Señor de la Noche" ● "Cuéntale" ● "Dile" ● "Pobre Diabla" ● "Ayer La Vi" ● "Angelito" ● "Repórtense" ● "Conteo" ● "Salió el Sol" ● "Hasta Abajo"	This is the second time for Don Omar in the festival, the first was in 2007. Don Omar used a base of "The Way I Are" by Timbaland featuring Keri Hilson as interlude between the first part of iDon songs and the second part of his show. He sang a cover of Tito El Bambino's "Flow Natural".	● Silver Torch ● Golden Torch ● Silver Seagull	19.2 16.2 Viewers: 3.5 millions
Day 3
Artist	Show/Songs Performed	Notes	Recognitions	Rating
Bombo Fica	● Humoristic show		● Silver Torch ● Golden Torch ● Silver Seagull	18.7 18.1 Viewers: 3.7 millions
Raphael	● "Cantares" ● "Somos" ● "Hablemos del Amor" ● "Mi Gran Noche" ● "Sandunga y Llorona" ● "Al Ponerse el Sol" ● "Como tú no Estás" ● "Quisiera" ● "Cierro Mis Ojos" ● "Yo Sigo Siendo Aquel" ● "Escándalo" ● "En Carne Viva" ● "Provocación" ● "Digan Lo Que Digan" ● "Como Yo Te Amo" ● "Gracias a la Vida" ● "Digan lo que digan" ● "La Fuerza Del Destino" ● "Siempre Estás Diciendo Que Te Vas" ● "Yo soy aquél" ● "Ámame"	After being awarded the first torch, one of hist tooth falls out on stage. He sang a song in duet with the Chilean singer and member of the judges for the international contest Beto Cuevas. He covered songs like "Gracias a la Vida" by Violeta Parra and "La Noche" by Salvatore Adamo, and used similar effects as those of Paul Anka for his presentation, digitally singing with Rocío Dúrcal and Rocío Jurado, in posthumous tribute.	● Silver Torch ● Golden Torch ● Silver Seagull	18.7 18.1 Viewers: 3.7 millions
Miranda!	● "Hola" ● "Traición" ● "Lo Que Siento Por Ti" ● "El Showcito" ● "Perfecta" ● "Imán" ● "Tu Misterioso Alguien" ● "Yo Te Diré" ● "Dón" ● "El Profe" ● "Prisionero" ● "Mentia"	Their performance began at 2:30 am with a portion of the audience leaving the show, the band appeared dressed as sailors, less Juliana Gattas.	● Silver Torch ● Golden Torch	18.7 18.1 Viewers: 3.7 millions
Day 4
Artist	Show/Songs Performed	Notes	Recognitions	Rating
Américo y La Nueva Alegría	● "Te Vas" ● "Me Olvidé De Tu Amor" ● "Entre El Amor y El Odio" ● "Tendría Que Llorar Por Tí" ● "Solo" ● "Hasta Ayer" ● "Que Tontos, Que Locos" ● "Me Enamoré De Ti y Qué" ● "No Me Mientas" ● "Ten Pena Por Ti" ● "Tu Hipocresia" ● "Traicionera" ● "El Embrujo" ● "Que Levante La Mano"	For first time ever in the history of the festival, a Tropical act opens a night. Américo covered the songs "Hasta Ayer" by Marc Anthony and "Que Tontos, Que Locos" by Aventura. After "Que Levante La Mano" the audience wanted to hear more songs, and Américo sang, for the second time, his hit single "Te Vas"; during his performance marks a rating impact on television audiences reaching 70 points as peak and averaging in TVN and Canal 13 58 rating points in audience. For first time in this festival edition was awarded with two silver gulls.	● Silver Torch ● Golden Torch ● Silver Seagull ● Silver Seagull	22.9 20.9 Viewers: 4.4 millions
Petrosyans	● Variety show	Host Soledad Onetto participated in the latest illusionism number, where she change of clothes in a couple of seconds on the stage.		22.9 20.9 Viewers: 4.4 millions
Tito El Bambino	● "Mi Cama Huele a Ti" ● "El Tra" ● "Caile" ● "La Busco" ● "El Booty" ● "Sol, Playa y Arena" ● "La Nena de Papi" ● "Solo Dime Que Si" ● "En La Disco" ● "Fans" ● "Mata" ● "Siente El Boom" ● "El Amor" ● "Te Pido Perdón" ● "Flow Natural" ● "Mia" ● "Under"	He recorded a special short film introducing his performance. His performance was booed by the crew for his large dialogues and repeat the songs "Mata" and "El Amor".	● Silver Torch ● Golden Torch ● Silver Seagull	22.9 20.9 Viewers: 4.4 millions
Day 5
Artist	Show/Songs Performed	Notes	Recognitions	Rating
La Noche	● "Y Volar" ● "Lástima" ● "Amor Sobre Cuatro Ruedas" ● "Es El Amor" ● "Mentiroso" ● "Rico y Suave" ● "Linda Mañana" ● "Mal Amor" ● "Quiero Ser Libre" ● "Ay Ay Ay" ● "Que Nadie Se Entere"	Chilean rapper DJ Méndez performed along with the band in the song "Ay Ay Ay".	● Silver Torch ● Golden Torch ● Silver Seagull	17.6 16.5 Viewers: 3.4 millions
Ricardo Arjona	● "El del Espejo" ● "Acompañame a Estar Solo" ● "Realmente No Estoy Tan Solo" ● "Sin Ti...Sin Mi" ● "Desnuda" ● "Tocando Fondo ● "Historia de Taxi" ● "El Demonio en Casa" ● "Buenas Noches Don David" ● "Quiero" ● "Dime Que No" ● "Como Duele" ● "A Ti" ● "Cuándo" ● "Te Conozco" ● "El Problema" ● "Si el Norte fuera el Sur" ● "Minutos" ● "Tarde (Sin Daños a Terceros)" ● "Señora de las Cuatro Décadas" ● "Pingüinos en la Cama" ● "Mujeres"	He used the same scenery of his latest Quinto Piso Tour. Arjona makes allusion to Tito El Bambino during his performance saying that "the awards should be earned and not asked for".	● Silver Torch ● Golden Torch ● Silver Seagull ● Silver Seagull	17.6 16.5 Viewers: 3.4 millions
Fanny Lu	● "Celos" ● "Tú No Eres Para Mi"	Fanny Lu was the last performance in the festival, one hour later of her show a 8.8 magnitude massive earthquake affected the area and the total south-central regions of Chile.		17.6 16.5 Viewers: 3.4 millions
Day 6
Artist	Show/Songs Performed	Notes	Recognitions	Rating
Los Jaivas				
Beto Cuevas				
Los Fabulosos Cadillacs				

== Participants ==
=== International competition ===
Country	Song	Artist	Composer
Italy	"Volare"	Simona Galeandro	Domenico Modugno, Francesco Migliacci
Argentina	"El Día Que Me Quieras"	Cristián Soloa	Carlos Gardel, Alfredo Le Pera
Cuba	"Para Vivir"	Coco Freeman	Pablo Milanés
Chile	"El Tiempo en las Bastillas"	Difuntos Correa	Fernando Ubiergo
United States	"Rock Around the Clock"	Elliott Yamin	Max C. Freedman, James E. Myers
France	"La Vie en Rose"	Melanie Dahan	Edith Giovanna Gassion, Luis Guglielmo Guglielmi
Mexico	"Si Nos Dejan"	Rodrigo Fernández	José Alfredo Jiménez
Peru	"La Flor de la Canela"	Sandra Muente	Isabel "Chabuca" Granda, Larco
Spain	"Eres Tú"	Seib	Juan Carlos Calderón
United Kingdom	"(I Can't Get No) Satisfaction"	The Thirst	Mick Jagger, Keith Richards

Notes
indicates the winner.
indicates the Top 3 classified to the final
indicates the Top 5 classified to the semifinal.

Chilean international song selection

Song	Artist	Original performer	Percentage
"El Tiempo en las Bastillas"	Difuntos Correa	Fernando Ubiergo	18,32%
"La Novia"	Alma	Antonio Prieto	9,38%
"El Rock del Mundial"	Jazzimodo	Los Ramblers	
"Todos Juntos"	Sabina Odone	Los Jaivas	
"La Voz de los 80s"	Inestable	Los Prisioneros	8,47%
"Los Momentos"	K-Reena	Eduardo Gatti	
"Tu Cariño se me Va"	Eric	Buddy Richard	8,60%
"Gracias a la Vida"	Nicole Natalino	Violeta Parra	
"Que Cante la Vida"	Aldo Bustos	Alberto Plaza	24,44%
"En Mejillones Yo Tuve un Amor"	Las Capitalinas	Fernando Trujillo	

Notes
indicates the winner.
indicates the Top 5 by votes.

- "Que Cante la Vida" won by people votes but the judges chose "El Tiempo en las Bastillas" as the winning song.

=== Folk competition ===
Country	Song	Artist	Composer
Argentina	"El Cantar es Andar"	Canto 4	César Isella
Mexico	"Traje de Charro"	Mauro Calderón	Ramón de la Cruz García
Chile	"Chinchinerito"	Arrabaleros	Daniel Cantillana, David Azán|-
Bolivia	"Miscky Simy"	Qolke Thikas	Oscar Castro
Colombia	"La Hamaca"	Micaela	María Alejandra Hoyos
Venezuela	"Vals Gitano"	María Alejandra Rodríguez	Pablo Gil

Notes
indicates the winner.
indicates the Top 3 classified to the second and final run.

== Festival's queen election ==
Contestant	Nationality	Occupation	Representation	Votes
Carla Ochoa	(Chile) Chilean	Model and ex-contestant of Pelotón VIP	TVN's Buenos Dias a Todos	93
Faloon Larraguibel	(Chile) Chilean	Model	CHV's Yingo	28
Jhendelyn Nuñez	(Chile) Chilean	Model	UCV TV's En Portada	69
Carolina Arregui	(Chile) Chilean	Actress	Part of the International Judges	94
Anahí	(Mexico) Mexican	Singer and ex-member of RBD	Part of the International Judges	30
Fanny Lu	(Colombia) Colombian	Singer	Part of the International Judges	6
Gabriela Vergara	(Venezuela) Venezuelan	Actress and model	Part of the International Judges	9
Mariela Montero	(Argentina) Argentinean	Model, singer and ex-contestant of Pelotón VIP	La Red's Intrusos	8
