= K-Réena =

- Born: Katherine Macarena Contreras Contreras; 15 August 1986 (age 40); Santiago, Chile
- Occupation: Singer
- Years active: 2007–present
- Musical career
- Genres: Pop, soul, R&B
- Instruments: Voice
- Label: Sello Azul

Katherine Macarena Contreras Contreras (born 15 August 1986), better known as K-Réena, is a Chilean pop, soul, and R&B singer.

== Biography ==
=== Early years ===
K-Réena is the grandniece of renowned Chilean singer Palmenia Pizarro. As a child she dedicated herself to showing her musical talent in school festivals, imitating artists like Michael Jackson. Influenced by black music, she debuted musically as the vocalist of a soul, hip hop, and funk band called Mr. Motaraz, touring various events and festivals throughout the country. It was at that time that she decided to take singing lessons at the Academy of Luis Jara, an artist with whom she has shared the stage on several occasions.

In 2007, she entered the TVN talent program Rojo Fama Contrafama, where she drew attention for her afro look and received great support from the public.

=== 2008–present ===
Determined to start her career as a soloist, she decided to adopt an artistic name, K-Réena, as a combination of her names Katherine and Macarena. Guided by her influences in black music, along with producer José Pablo Gómez, in 2009 she released her first self-titled album on the Sello Azul label. This album had several singles, such as "Aún estás", "Siento tanto amor", and "Rating", the latter with the collaboration of rapper Zaturno.

In 2010, K-Réena performed an adaptation of the song "Los momentos" by Eduardo Gatti at the 2010 Viña del Mar Festival, demonstrating the ability to turn a classic into a song full of beats, current and fresh. Although it was not the winning song to represent Chile in the international competition, her participation allowed her to be part of this festival, where she played the Bicentennial hymn, along with other Sello Azul artists.

On 22 March 2014, K-Réena, along with other artists such as Denise Rosenthal, Saiko, Difuntos Correa, Camila Silva, and Gepe was present at the first edition of the Daniel Zamudio Diversity Festival, organized to commemorate the young homosexual man brutally murdered in 2012, and in favor of diversity in any field and the promotion of non-discrimination, especially for LGBT people.

== Discography ==
=== Studio albums ===
- 2009 – K-Réena

=== Singles ===
- "Aún estás"
- "Siento tanto amor"
- "No quiero ser"
- "Rating"
- "Cuestión de piel"
