= Pampilla Festival =

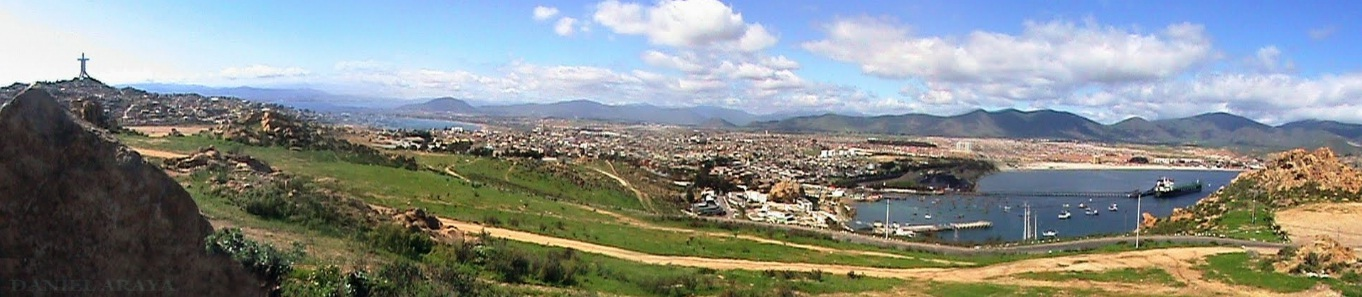
Sector of La Pampilla in Coquimbo, where the festivities take place

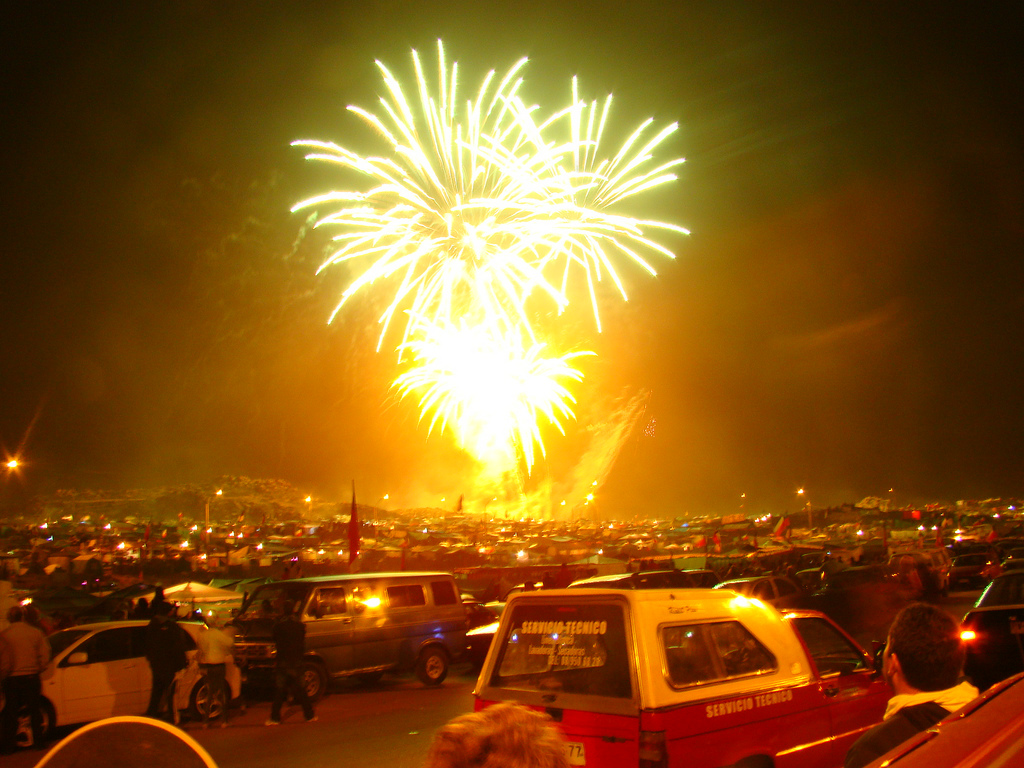
Closing day of the festival, 2012

The Pampilla Festival (Spanish: Fiesta de la Pampilla; also known as Pampilla de Coquimbo or simply La Pampilla) is a Chilean celebration that takes place between 18 and 20 September every year in honor of the country's Fiestas Patrias – although it usually extends two days before or two days after those dates – in the esplanade of the same name, located in the city of Coquimbo. During this period, even weeks before activities begin, hundreds of families settle in tents and vehicles in the hills.

== History ==
According to tradition, due to the distance between Coquimbo and Santiago, news of the establishment of the First Government Junta on 18 September 1810 arrived two days later. For this reason, 20 September is currently a holiday in the Coquimbo Region and the official closing date of La Pampilla. All these celebrations began to take place annually on 29 July 1823. There are records that indicate that, at the end of the 19th century, horse races were held in this place on 19 and 20 September. According to photographic archives, attendance during the Fiestas Patrias grew in the first decades of the 20th century.

When Coquimbo Department was created in 1864, La Pampilla – then known as La Serranía – was owned by Francisco Íñiguez Pérez. Upon his death, the land was auctioned and acquired in 1870 by José del Carmen Vicuña Lavigne, who used the property for public entertainment. In 1968 the land was acquired by the city's Lions Club after Meli Elizondo Diaz (local Lions’ Club President) organized the first music festival as a fundraising mechanism. Later and as planned, the property was transferred to the Municipality of Coquimbo in 1978. The mayor at the time, Jorge Morales Adriasola, signed this before the notary Alejandro Roncangliolo.

The festival at La Pampilla corresponds to the most multitudinous celebration of the Fiestas Patrias. From the beginning of the celebrations until 20 September, more than 100,000 people are present, some in tents, to enjoy the fondas and shows that take place there. Its popularity is such that it recently has begun to be celebrated in other locations in northern Chile. Outside of September, the site is used as a venue for amateur football and motorsport, the latter due to the road course built in 2006, which has hosted regional speed competitions.

== Internal distribution ==
During September's celebration, fondas and ramadas are set up - places where traditional Chilean food and drinks (alcoholic and non-alcoholic) are sold. Several traditional games are held near the sector of the ramadas.

The sector designated for the sale of national and international products of all types - clothes, electrical appliances, candies, trinkets, and different articles for the home - occupies a great part of La Pampilla. In this sector, people who want to set up a stall must pay the Municipality for a permit.

== Artistic presentations and activities ==
Every year there are performances by many national and international artists, such as folk and pop singers, as well as humorous shows. These are presented on the monumental stage, located in a moat in the western sector of La Pampilla, although previously there was a stage in the shape of a pirate galleon, popularly known as "El Galeón".

Also, every year different activities take place, such as musical contests and traditional sporting events. These, in conjunction with the artistic presentations on stage, make up the festival's variety program.

== Timeline ==
=== 1960s ===
In the Coquimbo Municipal Stadium in 1963 the First Chilean Songwriting Contest and the First Contest of Folkloric Ensembles were held, events broadcast by Radio Riquelme of Coquimbo and Radio Balmaceda of Santiago. Organization was a joint effort by the Municipality of Coquimbo, the National Association of Firefighters, Radio Riquelme, and led by the local Lions Club. The general coordinator was Meli Elizondo Diaz, the Lions Club President. The master of ceremonies for these competitions was the announcer Renato Deformes, together with César Araya Torres and Alberto Martínez.

In 1964 the previous year's musical contests were re-performed. On this occasion, the station that broadcast the event for the rest of Chile was Radio Minería. The official announcer was Ricardo García, who was also the host of the Viña del Mar International Song Festival.

=== 1970s ===
In 1973 the festival was not held because the country was under a state of siege after the 11 September coup d'état that had overthrown President Salvador Allende.

=== 1980s ===
Among the outstanding artistic presentations of 1988 were those of Jappening con ja (comprising Gloria Benavides, Marilú Cuevas, Eduardo Ravani, Fernando Alarcón and Patricio Torres) and Álvaro Scaramelli. Los Viking's 5, Largo Camino, and the Carén Folk Ensemble performed at the Lions Club tent.

In 1989, the first Pampilla headed by the mayor Jorge Auger, the general coordinator was Víctor Muñoz. On this occasion the following performers were presented: Lorena, Jorge Navarrete, Miguelo, Soledad Guerrero, Los 24 Ancianos, Los Huasos del Maule, and El Grupo Almendral. In addition, the Coro Laura Reyes participated in the inauguration of the festival.

=== 1990s ===
In 1990 the main attraction of the festival was the performance of humorist Jorge Navarrete.

Among the presentations that were made in 1991 were: Halcones of the Chilean Air Force, Pachuco y la Cubanacán, Juan Antonio Labra, Álvaro Salas, Folkloric Ballet of Chile (BAFOCHI), Irene Llano, and Los Viking's 5.

In 1992 the masters of ceremonies were Felipe Camiroaga (Televisión Nacional de Chile) and Humberto Vásquez Cortés (Canal 8). Among the artists who performed were La Sonora de Tommy Rey, BAFOCHI, Los Indolatinos, Claudio Reyes, and Mauricio Rubio.

The 1993 edition, the first Pampilla by Pedro Velásquez, was held between 18 and 20 September. Jaime Dupré was the general coordinator and Juan José Salinas was the emcee. Some of the artists that were presented were: Gigi Martin (comedian), Los Viking's 5, La Sonora de Tommy Rey, Germán Casas, Pachuco y la Cubanacán, and Valija Diplomática. In the Giant Tent of the Lions Club, La Sonora de Tommy Rey, Grupo Uno, and the Carén Folk Ensemble performed. The emcee was Carlos Alberto Espinoza.

In 1994 the festival was held between 17 and 20 September. The artistic program included the following guests: Los Viking's 5, Giolito y su Combo, Adrián y los Dados Negros, Palmenia Pizarro, Luis Jara, and Hermógenes Conache.

In 1995 the Pampilla Festival had Wilma Sánchez as its general coordinator, and it took place between 16 and 20 September of that year. Some of the artists of this edition were the following: Peter Rock, Los Viking's 5, Adrián y los Dados Negros, Lorena, Giovanni Falchetti, Los Chacareros de Paine, Nicole, the National Folkloric Ballet, Daniel Vilches and Chucho Monsalves, and Los Tres.

The general coordinator of La Pampilla in 1996 was again Wilma Sánchez. Some of the invited artists were Giovanni Falchetti, Los Viking's 5, Pachuco y la Cubanacán, Brisas de Chile, Dinamita Show, Los Cumaná, Garibaldi, Lucho Barrios, and Illapu.

The 1997 festival took place between 17 and 21 September. The general commissioner of that edition was Romelio Castro. Some of the invited artists were: Miranda!, Los Viking's 5, Los Atletas de la Risa, Adrián y los Dados Negros, Los Jaivas, and Sandy & Papo.

In 1998, the artistic presentations were made on 18 and 19 September, and the first Pampilla de Coquimbo Folkloric Root National Festival was held, which was put on by Marengo Producciones and under the musical direction of Enrique Arenas. The artists invited to this edition were BAFOCHI, El Clavel, Isabel and Ángel Parra, Tito Fernández, Pancho del Sur, and Joe Vasconcellos.

The 1999 edition was under the administration of Mayor Pedro Velásquez and was hosted by Ethel Savè and Juan José Salinas. Among the invited artists were: Daniel Vilches y la Cámara de los Loros, Las Brisas de Chile, Los Taquilleros del Humor, Luis Ledesma and Claudia Jofré, Illapu, Ráfaga, and Los Viking's 5.

=== 2000s ===
In 2005 the Pampilla Festival was held between 17 and 20 September. On this occasion the Argentine model Jésica Cirio was chosen as the queen of La Pampilla. Among the artistic presentations were: Huentemapu Folkloric Group, Johana Torres, Manuel Moyano, La Parafernálicos de la Risa, Adriano, Los Viking's 5, Los Kjarkas, hosting by Walter Ardiles on 18 September; Grupo Ram, Grupo Eureka, Miguel Ángel, Grupo Candilejas, Germán Aguirre, Los Viking's 5, and Reggaeton Boys on 19 September; Los Hermanos Bustos and José Luis "El Puma" Rodríguez on 20 September.

In 2006, the queen of La Pampilla was again chosen from among a group of models that submitted their candidacy. The activity was promoted by the newspaper La Cuarta, and on 19 September, the winner was the dancer from the TVN series Rojo: Fama contrafama, Yamna Lobos.

The 2007 edition was the first that saw Óscar Pereira as mayor of Coquimbo; It was carried out between 15 and 21 September. The production was managed by Sergio Aguilera. In terms of security, Carabineros de Chile announced the deployment of a large contingent of police officers inside La Pampilla, far superior to previous versions of the festival. The emcees of the last nights were José Alfredo "Pollo" Fuentes and María Eugenia "Kenita" Larraín. Among the artists, Ram, Ballet Folclórico, Candilejas and Bandguardia performed on 16 September; Folkloric Ballet, Carmen Solari, La Rancherita, and María José Quintanilla on 17 September; Talo Pinto and Los Chinganeros del Puerto, El Clavel, and Los Jaivas on 18 September; Osonora, The Kings Of The Kings, and La Noche on 19 September; Los Mascott, Los Viking's 5, and Los Nocheros on 20 September; Grupo Albacora, Cecilia, Luis Jara and Mauricio Flores show, Paty Cofré, Gisella Molinero, and Blanquita Nieves and company on 21 September.

=== 2010s ===
In 2013 the emcee was Rafael Araneda. The artists who performed were the following: Inti-Illimani and Los Viking's 5 on 17 September; Luis Jara and DJ Méndez on 18 September; Che Copete, Sonora Dinamita, and Sonora Malecón on 19 September; Los Vásquez, José Feliciano, and Miguel Mateos on 20 September; and Daddy Yankee on 21 September.

The artists who performed in 2014 were Jorge Yáñez and Illapu on 17 September; Grupo Albacora, Megapuesta, and Clares de Amor on 18 September; Gepe and J Álvarez on 19 September; and Los Viking's 5 and Emmanuel on 20 September.

The 2015 edition was suspended on 17 September due to the Illapel earthquake that occurred on the previous day. For the rest of the time the associated artistic show and the fireworks show that marked the closing on 20 September were suspended. In addition, the entrance fee was suspended to encourage visits to the gastronomic sector and camping area, which both remained open. An activity called "Pampilla Solidaria" was carried out in order to raise funds for those affected by the earthquake. This was done on 20 September and included participation by: 31 Minutos, Chancho en Piedra, and Ana Gabriel. In addition, Javiera Toledo, from the Tierras Blancas sector, was elected queen of La Pampilla 2015.

== Queens of La Pampilla ==
- 2004 – Lola Melnick
- 2005 – Jésica Cirio
- 2006 – Yamna Lobos
- 2007 – Carla Ochoa
- 2008
- 2009 – Francesca Cigna
- 2010
- 2011 – Nicole Moreno
- 2012 – Claudia Tarbuskovic
- 2013 – María Eugenia Larraín
- 2014 – Angie Alvarado
- 2015 – Javiera Toledo
- 2016 – Juvinza Cortés
- 2017 – Tamara Cortés Rojas
