= Camila Silva (singer) =

Chilean pop singer and composer (born 1994)

- Born: Camila Constanza Silva Ojeda; 17 February 1994 (age 32); Talcahuano, Chile
- Occupations: Singer Musical career
- Genres: Pop
- Instruments: Voice, guitar
- Label: Sony Music
- Years active: 2011–present

Camila Constanza Silva Ojeda (born 17 February 1994) is a Chilean pop singer and composer, known for winning the first season of the TV series Talento chileno. Her self-titled debut album was released in Chile on 8 November 2011 on the Sony Music label.

== Biography ==
Camila Silva was born on 17 February 1994 at Higueras Hospital in Talcahuano, Biobío Region. She lived a large part of her childhood in the Magallanes Region, where she took her first steps in music, singing at functions and events, including with the band Los Ojos de Medlaz. She lived in Punta Arenas from 2000 to 2007 and studied at the Punta Arenas School.

Silva finished her secondary education at Colegio Concepción San Pedro in San Pedro de la Paz, where she also participated in the school's choir. Her first appearance on television was on the 13C show La Ruta Bicentenario, where she performed "Mercy" by Duffy live.

== Career ==
=== 2010 ===
On 4 October 2010, the second episode of auditions for Talento chileno was broadcast, where Silva achieved public recognition with her live performance of the song "Other Side of the World" by KT Tunstall. Her entry was praised by the jury and made the cover of Las Últimas Noticias on 5 October, becoming the program's second cover of the newspaper's Monday edition. Her performance was also the most watched of that night, reaching 37 rating points with 3.8 million viewers. That same week, and due to the success of her appearance, she was invited to sing the song live on the Chilevisión program Primer plano.

Before her public debut, Silva had already written two original songs named "Guitarra Blanca" and "Último Día". During the "behind the scenes" segment of her presentation on Talento chileno, she affirmed that her intention was to dedicate herself entirely to music in the future.

On 15 November 2010, Camila Silva appeared at the stage of semi-final galas where she performed the song "The Story" by Brandi Carlile. In general she received good reviews, despite the fact that Antonio Vodanovic confessed that he had erred in his recommendation that she not use the guitar since it only served as support, because in the gala performance the jury told her that her guitar helped her have more confidence and that was her style. Vodanovic also compared her with Laura Pausini and Francisca Valenzuela. The jury recommended that she take a risk with songs in Spanish. Camila was the winner of the night with first place in popular voting, rising as one of the favorites of the program.

==== Appearances on Talento Chileno ====
Stage	Broadcast date	Song	Result
Auditions	4 October 2010	"Other Side of the World" by KT Tunstall	Qualified
Pre-selection	25 October 2010	—	Qualified
Gala 3	15 November 2010	"The Story" by Brandi Carlile	Qualified
Final	13 December 2010	"Adiós" by Jesse & Joy	Winner

On 14 December 2010, the popular vote crowned Silva as the winner of the first season of Talento Chileno, and earned her an appearance at the 2011 edition of the Viña del Mar International Song Festival. Antonio Vodanovic said he was in talks with Argentine producer and musician Leo García to start work on her debut album that would go on sale during 2011. Chilean singer Luis Jara was interested in helping Silva in her musical career. As he said in an interview in Las Vegas for the newspaper La Cuarta, his mother and also manager, Linda Ojeda, told the singer to give her a comprehensive preparation scholarship to his academy.

Camila has a natural talent; she is very spontaneous and moldable. The idea is that she can make this a life choice. Now you have to support the family and not lose your way.

— Luis Jara, La Cuarta

During December 2010, Silva began preparing her performance for the Viña del Mar Festival, where she commented that she would love Claudio "El Gitano" Valdés to also participate with her. Claudio took second place in the talent competition where she was the winner. Virginia Reginato, mayor of Viña del Mar, referred to Silva's participation in the festival, saying that she did not comply with the requirements of artists presented at the festival, so she could only be in the opening of one night. On 21 December 2010, Silva received recognition from the Municipality of San Pedro de la Paz, as part of a show supporting the development of that municipality's arts and culture. This award was added to one already received on 7 December 2010 from the mayor of San Pedro de la Paz, where she was recognized as the "2010 Outstanding Artist" during the city's anniversary.

=== 2011 ===
She was presented at the beginning of 2011 at the 3rd Festival of the Voice of San Pedro de la Paz and at the commemorations of the Sanatajuanina Week of the commune of Santa Juana. Silva was presented on 23 February 2011, at the opening of that day of the 2011 Viña del Mar Festival, as part of a tribute to the Argentine singer Sandro, who died in early 2010. At the end of March 2011, she participated with Manuel García in the launch of the annual Hogar de Cristo campaign in the Bío Bío Region. Silva performed at the Fiebre de baile and Talento Chileno finale during 2011, singing "Último Día", which was the first single from her debut album with the Sony Music label that debuted in stores on 8 November 2011. However this first single failed to enter the popularity charts. The second single from this album was "Al Fin Te Encontré", which was released online by the record company the first week of October 2011, as well as being released on radio, making a slight impact during the first months. However, beginning in March 2012, the song began to gain a radio audience, returning to the charts and causing the company to delay the release of the next single.

On 25 June 2012, she released the second single, "Distancia". On 31 July of the same year, the video of her first single "Al Fin te encontré" was released on her official Vevo account, consisting of a live performance of the song. During the same period, several songs from her debut album were used as the soundtrack of the successful television series Soltera otra vez on Canal 13.

On 22 March 2014, Camila Silva was present at the first edition of the Daniel Zamudio Diversity Festival, a festival organized to commemorate the young homosexual man brutally murdered in 2012 and in favor of diversity in any field and promotion of non-discrimination, especially for LGBT people. Other Chilean artists who participated in this festival were Saiko, Gepe, Difuntos Correa, K-Réena, and Denise Rosenthal.

== Musical style ==
Silva's music is predominantly pop, although it includes acoustic sounds, including pop rock ballads. Love and amorous disappointments are the main themes used in her songs, which she writes herself. Her major musical influences are Lily Allen, Regina Spektor, and Francisca Valenzuela.

== Discography ==
=== Studio albums ===
Title	Details	Top position	Certifications
Title	Details	CHI	Certifications
Camila Silva	Release: 8 November 2011; Label: Sony Music; Formats: CD, Digital download	38	

=== Singles ===
Title	Year	Top position	Certifications	Album
Title	Year	CHI	Certifications	Album
"Último día"	2011	—		Camila Silva
"Al fin te encontré"	2011	32		Camila Silva
"Distancia"	2012	72		Camila Silva
"—" signifies a song which was released but did not appear in the charts.
