= Adriana Barrientos =

Chilean model

Adriana Margoth Barrientos Castro
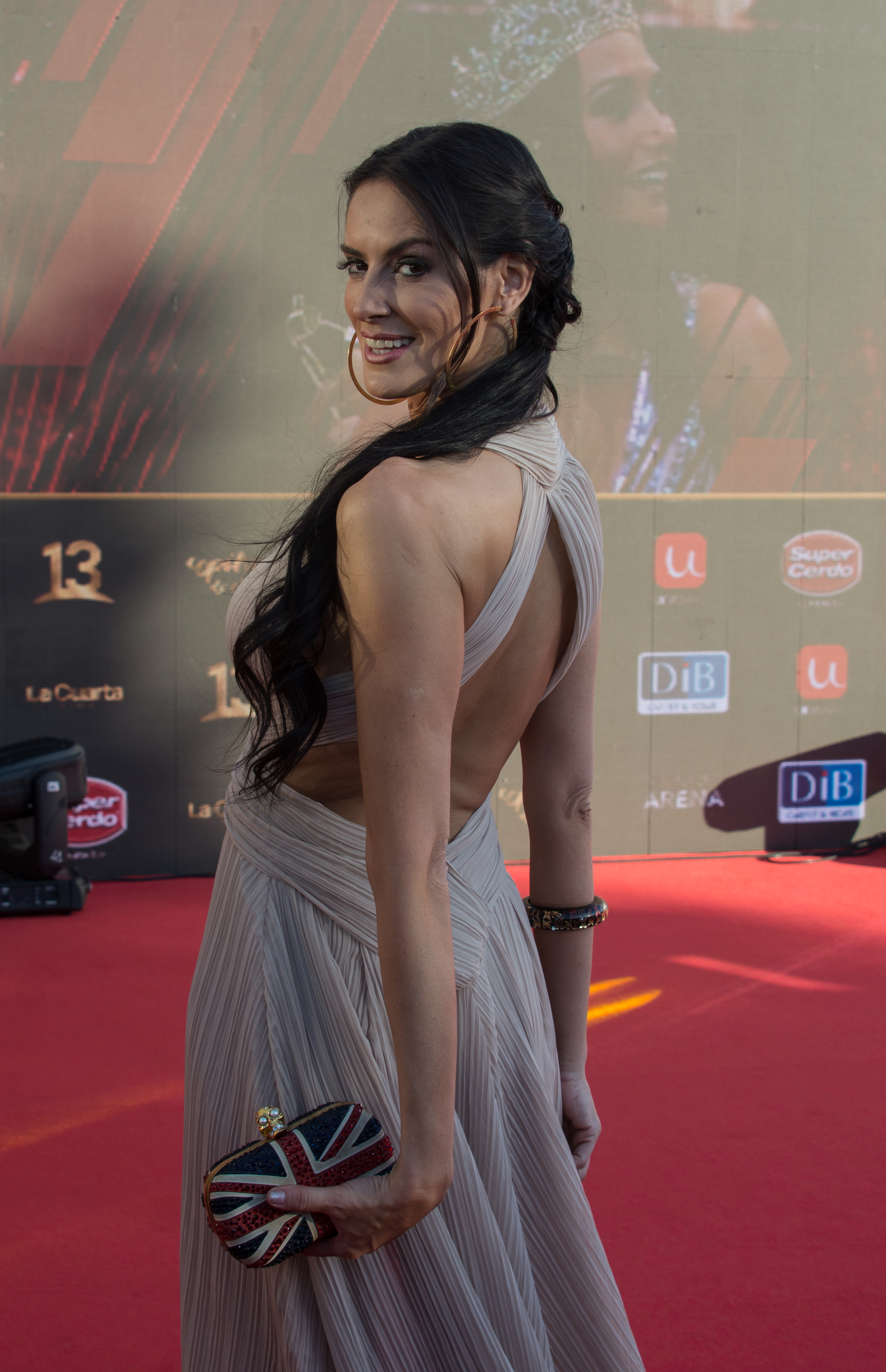
- Adriana Barrientos in 2018
- Born: Adriana Barrientos; 16 April 1980 (age 46); Punta Arenas, Magallanes, Chile
- Occupation: Model
- Years active: 2004-2010
- Known for: Former Miss Chile
- Height: 1.80
- Parents: Enrique Barrientos (father); Margot Castro (mother)

Adriana Barrientos Castro (born 16 April 1980) is a Chilean model.

== Early career ==
Barrientos began her modeling career in 2004, appearing on the morning television show Buenos Días a Todos on Televisión Nacional de Chile, hosted by Felipe Camiroaga, She also featured on Trato Hecho, a program on Canal 13, which was hosted by Mario Kreutzberger, widely known as "Don Francisco".

On August 26, 2004, Barrientos competed in Miss Chile, where she placed as the second finalist. Later that year, on October 6, she participated in Miss World Chile and won the title of Best Swimsuit. In April 2005, she traveled to Guangzhou, China, representing Chile in the Miss International Asia-Pacific beauty contest, where she placed eighth. That same year, Barrientos appeared in a television commercial for Soprole cream.

In 2006, Barrientos gained wider recognition following a public dispute with fellow model María José López over a romantic involvement with Chilean footballer Luis “Mago” Jiménez. The incident occurred on the entertainment program Mira Quién Habla on the private television channel Mega. This controversy helped boost her profile, leading to her becoming a panelist on the same show.

== Transition to television ==
Barrientos became involved in the nighttime television show Morandé con Compañía, hosted by Kike Morandé, where she worked as a model, dancer, and actress in comedy sketches. In 2009, she participated in the Canal 13 reality show 1910, becoming one of the four finalists. During the show, she met her future boyfriend, Daniel Pinto.

In February 2010, Barrientos worked as a reporter and entertainment commentator for Alfombra Roja, with significant involvement in covering the Viña del Mar International Song Festival. Later, in April, she competed in the dance competition Fiebre de Baile III on Chilevisión, where she was the 13th contestant to be eliminated.

In early 2011, Barrientos appeared in a revue show with comedian Ernesto Belloni (Ché Copete). She also traveled to Argentina with Nicole Moreno (Luli), where she appeared on several Argentine TV shows, including Soñando por Bailar: el debate, Éste es el Show, and Bien de Verano. Upon returning to Chile, she joined Chilevisión’s entertainment show SQP as a guest panelist.

During the 2011 Viña del Mar International Song Festival, Barrientos ran for “Reina del Festival” (Queen of the Festival), but finished last, receiving only 7 out of 338 votes from journalists covering the event, reflecting the public’s lukewarm reception during the candidates’ official presentation.

Throughout 2011, Barrientos made guest appearances on Canal 13’s En Su Propia Trampa and the telenovela Peleles. In October of that year, she returned to Argentina to appear on Infama, a celebrity show on América TV. She was also cast by Carmen Barbieri for the revue theater production Barbierísima in 2012, becoming the first Chilean to regularly perform in this type of show in Argentina. Additionally, she participated in Bailando por un Sueño 2011, hosted by Marcelo Tinelli, where her performance and speaking style attracted criticism from figures like Moria Casán and Cinthia Fernández, but increased her visibility on Argentine television.

After finishing Barbierísima, Barrientos returned to Chile in February 2012 to compete in the fifth season of Fiebre de Baile, where she reached the semifinals. She also made an appearance at the Gala of the Viña del Mar Festival that year and was later invited to the morning show TelefeAM in Argentina, where her outfit—featuring the Union Jack—drew criticism from some Argentine commentators. Additionally, she appeared as a guest on the TVN docu-reality show Adopta un Famoso.

== Current career ==
In late 2011, Barrientos joined Carmen Barbieri’s theatrical show Barbierísima. She took on the role of the lead vedette, performing alongside Andrea Estévez and Claudia Albertario in the musical revue.

fROM 2024, she is active on the adult platform Onfayer, where she provides exclusive nude photos and videos for paying subscribers.. Actualmente se desempeña como panelista de farándula en diversos medios, siento panelista de Zona de Estrellas.
