= Así Es =

Así Es may refer to:

- Así Es (Gerardo album)
- Así Es (Américo album)
