= Camila Silva =

Camila Silva may refer to:

- Camila Silva (singer) (born 1994), Chilean singer-songwriter
- Camila Silva (tennis) (born 1992), Chilean tennis player
