= Nicole Moreno =

Chilean model, dancer and panelist

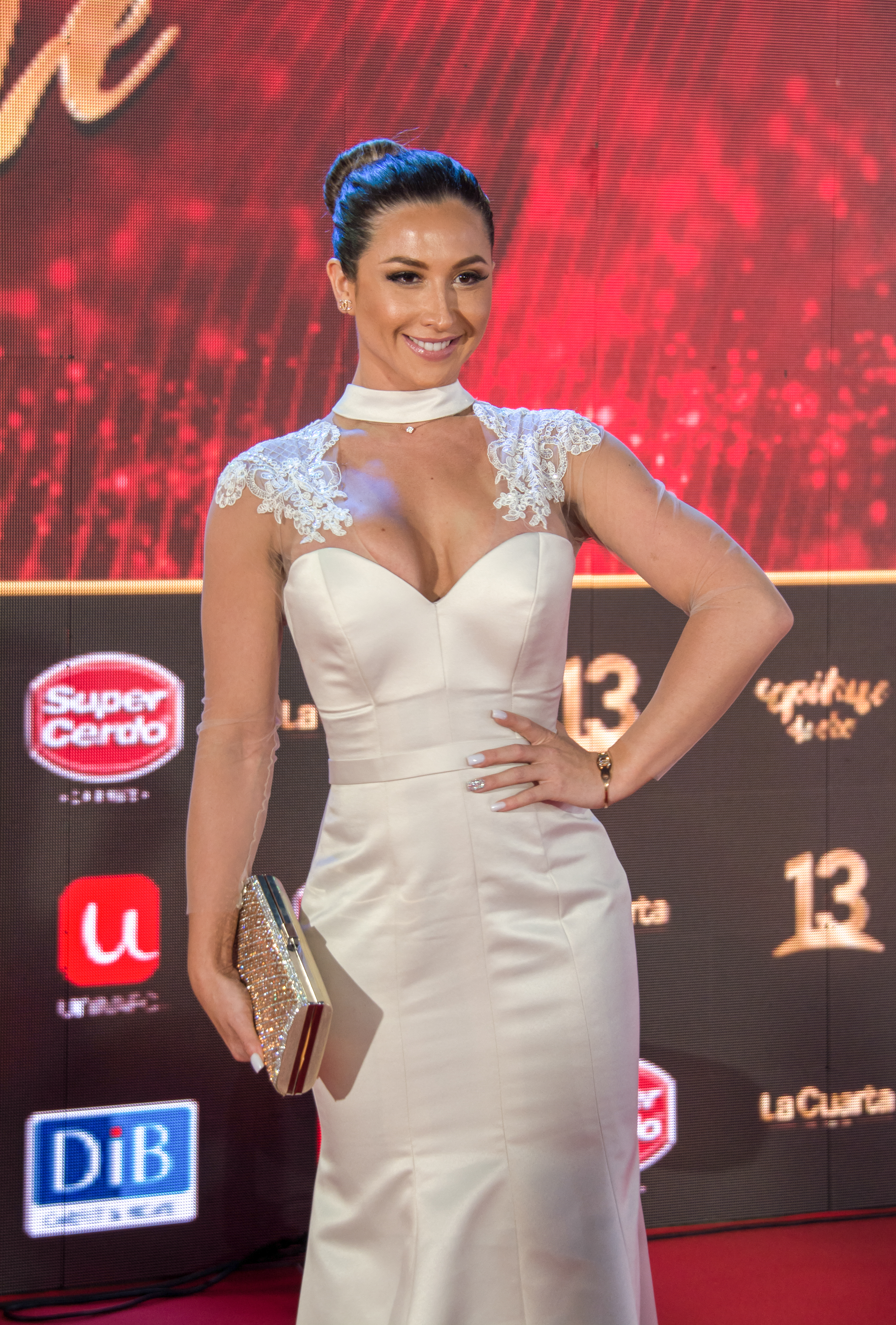
- Born: Nicole Andrea Moreno; 22 August 1987 (age 38); Santiago, Chile
- Other names: Luli; Luli Love
- Occupations: Model, dancer, panelist, fitness influencer and bodybuilder
- Children: Francisco Javier
- Parents: Julio Moreno (father); María Angélica (mother)
- Awards: Queen of the National Milk and Meat Festival (2009); Queen of the Pampilla Festival (2011); Queen of the Viña del Mar Festival (2016)

Nicole Andrea Moreno (born 22 August 1987), also known as Luli (/ˈluːli/ LOO-lee) and Luli Love, is a Chilean model, dancer, panelist, fitness influencer and bodybuilder.

The winner of several beauty pageants in Chile, she was Queen of the Viña del Mar Festival in 2016, a title given by the entertainment press to the most outstanding woman of the Viñamarino festival.

== Childhood and adolescence ==
The daughter of María Angélica and Julio Moreno, Nicole Moreno is the oldest of three siblings. She spent her childhood in the commune of San Bernardo y la Cisterna, Santiago. From a very young age, the world of modeling and dancing caught her attention. According to Moreno, her greatest aspiration when she was a child was to be a catwalk model. Moreno started working at the age of 14, but soon discovered her early pregnancy with her son Francisco Javier. In her conservative home, she says, it was difficult to assimilate, but her family managed to accept it once the baby was born. According to her, she had to postpone her adolescence to raise her son. In an interview on 4 January 2013 she also spoke about suffering from bulimia.

== Discovery and "Luli" ==
Moreno debuted on the Chilean juvenile court television program Mekano, broadcast by the channel Mega, in 2006. Her jump to fame came in 2007 when she was invited by Chilevisión to appear on the series SQP, where she showed her dances in Viña del Mar. In 2009, she was crowned Queen of the National Milk and Meat Festival in Osorno, the largest festival in southern Chile.

In 2010 she worked with the comedian Ernesto Belloni in the magazine Sensualísima.

In 2011, she was invited by Channel 13 of Argentina to appear on Soñando por Bailar and Este es el show. She was the creator of the personality Luli Love, characterized by her particular way of speaking, by wearing a lot of pink, and by making mistakes with names. She formed a duo with the Chilean humorist Pedro Ruminot. Nicole Moreno has been on different programs for more than a decade on Chilean television.

In 2011, she was crowned Queen of the Pampilla Festival in Coquimbo.

Moreno is also a businesswoman: in 2013 she opened a clothing store that bears her name. That same year she participated in the Government of Chile's campaign against discrimination.

== Queen of the Viña del Mar Festival ==
In February 2016, Moreno was elected Queen of the Viña del Mar Festival, a title delivered by members of the press assigned to the Viña del Mar International Song Festival, via a secret ballot. She competed against Giselle Gómez Rolón and Vanesa Borghi.

The day after the election, the prize of a sash, a ring, and the crown was delivered by mayor Virginia Reginato. The coronation ceremony took place in front of the cameras of the accredited press. The queen threw herself into the pool at the Hotel O'Higgins in Viña del Mar. The following year she handed over her title to Chilean model Francisca "Kika" Silva.

In April 2016 Moreno was featured on the cover of the Chilean magazine Paula, where she presented a new change of style.

In December 2016 she was invited by the Chilevisión program El Cubo to tell details about her panic attack and how she became Queen of the Viña del Mar Festival.

In February 2017 she was on the cover of the magazine Caras, and later she was invited by Mega to the morning program Mucho gusto, where she served as a panelist.

== Fitness and Bodybuilding ==
After retiring of TV and modelling, Nicole became an fitness influencer and bodybuilding athlete. She became champion of the Santiago Muscle Fest 2022, the Chilean champion of the Bikini class in the Viña Muscle Show 2024 and runner-up of the NPC Worldwide Sudamérica contest in 2024. She also wrote a book called "Strong Woman" (Mujer Fuerte).

== Television ==
| Year | Program | Role | Channel |
|---|---|---|---|
| 2006 | Mekano | Dancer | Mega |
| 2007 | SQP | Panelist | CHV |
| 2009 | Fiebre de baile | Eliminated contestant | CHV |
| 2010 | Mira quién habla | Guest | Mega |
| 2011 | Este es el show | Guest | Channel 13 |
| 2011 | Bien de verano | Guest | Magazine |
| 2012 | Mundos Opuestos | Contestant (left) | Channel 13 |
| 2012 | Vértigo | Guest (3rd eliminated) | Channel 13 |
| 2013 | Vértigo | Guest (5th eliminated) | Channel 13 |
| 2014 | Amor a prueba | 1st eliminated/left | Mega |
| 2015 | Primer plano | Guest | CHV |
| 2016 | Bienvenidos | Panelist | Channel 13 |
| 2016 | Bailando | Participant | Channel 13 |
| 2016 | Bienvenidos | Fashion segment | Channel 13 |
| 2016 | ¿Volverías con tu ex? | Guest | Mega |
| 2016 | Vértigo | Guest (5th eliminated) | Channel 13 |
| 2016 | El Cubo | Guest (interview) | CHV |
| 2016 | Teletón 2016 | Participant in the "Olimpiatón" | National broadcast |
| 2017 | Mucho gusto | Panelist | Mega |

== Awards ==
- 2009, Queen of the National Milk and Meat Festival
- 2011, Queen of the Pampilla Festival
- 2016, Queen of the Viña del Mar Festival
- 2022, Champion of the Santiago Muscle Fest in the Bikini category
- 2024, Champion of Viña Muscle Show in the Bikini category

| Preceded by | Queen of the Pampilla Festival; 2011 | Succeeded by Claudia Tarbuskovic |
| Preceded by Jhendelyn Núñez | Queen of the Viña del Mar Festival; 2016 | Succeeded by Francisca "Kika" Silva |
