= El aparecido =

Single by Víctor Jara

from the album Víctor Jara
- Language: Spanish
- English title: The appeared The ghost
- B-side: "Solo"
- Genre: Nueva Cancion Chilena
- Length: 2:16
- Songwriter(s): Víctor Jara

Víctor Jara singles chronology
"El aparecido"	"El lazo"

El aparecido ("The appeared", also translated as "The ghost") is a Chilean song originally written and recorded by Víctor Jara which was included in the 1967 album Víctor Jara. The lyrics tell the story of a man who was persecuted for his political ideologies, often the man in the song is attributed to Che Guevara, an Argentine guerrilla fighter. Because of this, the Communist Party of Chile criticized Jara, as the party was trying to establish a socialist government via democratic means, and not through armed guerrillas.

== Covers ==
- The Chilean band Inti-Illimani recorded a popular cover in their 1973 album La Nueva Canción Chilena.
- Ismael Serrano, a Spanish singer-songwriter, recorded a cover in his 1998 album Tributo a Víctor Jara.
- Grup Yorum, a Turkish band, recorded a cover during a 2010 concert.
- The UDEC Symphony Orchestra recorded a version in their 2013 album Víctor Jara Sinfónico.
- Difuntos Correa released their cover as a single in 2015.
- The Chilean band Lasavia recorded a cover in their 2019 EP Versiones en Mantra.
