= Pelotón VIP =

Chilean TV reality show

Pelotón VIP is the third series of the popular Chilean TV reality show Pelotón, produced by Televisión Nacional de Chile (TVN).

The series ran from April to November 2009, featuring a number of Chilean celebrities, with Karen Doggenweiler and Rafael Araneda as the presenters. The first prize was 50 million Chilean pesos.

Francisco Schilling was announced as the winner, in a prime-time broadcast on 17 November 2009.

== Contestants ==
Name	Age	Eliminated	Previously
(Chile) Francisco Schilling	27	Winner	
(Chile) María Eugenia Larraín	36	2nd place	16th eliminated
(Chile) Nabih Chadud	32	3rd place	
(Chile) Angie Alvarado	19	19th eliminated	7th eliminated
(Chile) Pablo Schilling	25	18th eliminated	
(Brazil) Francini Amaral	26	17theliminated	
(Chile) Mario Larraín	36	Quit	
(Chile) Óscar Garcés	27	15th eliminated	4th eliminated
(Chile) Carla Ochoa	30	14th eliminated	
(Haiti) Gyvens Laguerre	29	13th eliminated	
(Chile) Maximiliano Mellado	20	12th eliminated	
(Argentina) Mariela Montero	29	11th eliminated	
(Cuba) Anoika Wade	24	10th eliminated	9th eliminated
(Chile) Juan Cristóbal Foxley	41	Quit	
(Spain) (Chile) Carolina Sotomayor	33	8th eliminated	
(Chile) Romina Martin	24	6th eliminated	
(Chile) Katherine Orellana	23	5th eliminated	3rd eliminated
(Chile) Miguel Esbir	52	Quit	
(Chile) Isabel Fernández	22	2nd eliminated	
(Chile) Françoise Perrot	22	Quit	
(Chile) Cristián Vidal	28	1st eliminated	

== Sources ==
- TVN: Pelotón website (in Spanish)
