= Kika Silva =

Chilean model, actress and television personality

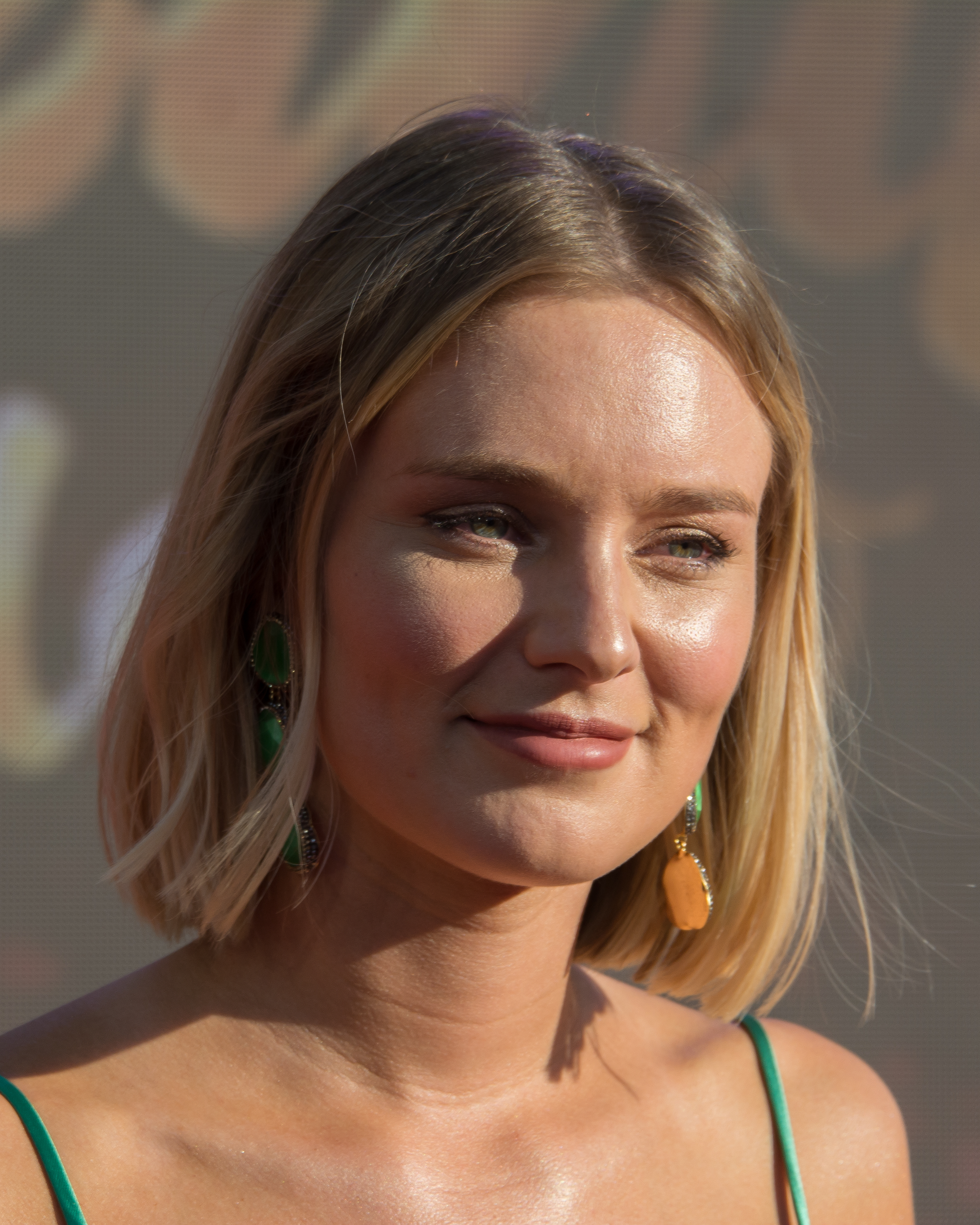
- Silva at the 2018 Copihue de Oro
- Born: María Francisca Silva Sánchez; March 18, 1992 (age 33); Santiago, Chile
- Occupation(s): Model, television personality
- Years active: 2012-present
- Website: Official Twitter page

María Francisca "Kika" Silva Sánchez (born March 18, 1992) is a Chilean model, actress and television personality.

== Early life and education ==
Francisca Silva was born on March 18, 1992, in Santiago, Chile. She is the daughter of Daniel Silva and hockey player Francisca Sánchez, and is the eldest of four siblings. In her time as a schoolgirl in the Nazaret School she participated on the athletic team, but a spinal injury when she was only 14 years old forced her to stop. After completing her secondary education in 2010, she studied physical education at the Universidad Andrés Bello. In 2012 she spent five months in Mexico to enter into modeling, where she did work with the magazine Vogue Latin America. Later that year she returned to Chile to pursue television acting.

== Career ==
Silva began her television career hosting the program Vía de escape on the cable television channel Vive Deportes, and later became part of the showbiz program SQP. She is a model and panelist of the morning show Bienvenidos on Canal 13.

In 2017 she was crowned Queen of the Festival in the LVIII International Festival of the Song of Viña del Mar. The final was against the Spanish model Gala Caldirola and the Mexican singer Jass Reyes, in a narrow voting. The traditional "piscinazo" was scheduled for Saturday, February 25, but was suspended because of security problems that arose after the demonstrations in the vicinity of the Hotel O'Higgins. The crown was delivered by Virginia Reginato. The winner also received the classic ring, which this year had 32 diamonds and 20 emeralds.

== Television ==
- Vía de Escape
- Vive Deportes
- Soltera otra vez (2013)
- Toc Show (2013-2014)
- Bala loca (2016, cameo)
- Bienvenidos (2016–present, panelist)
