= Natalia Cuevas =

Chilean singer, comedian, impressionist and actress

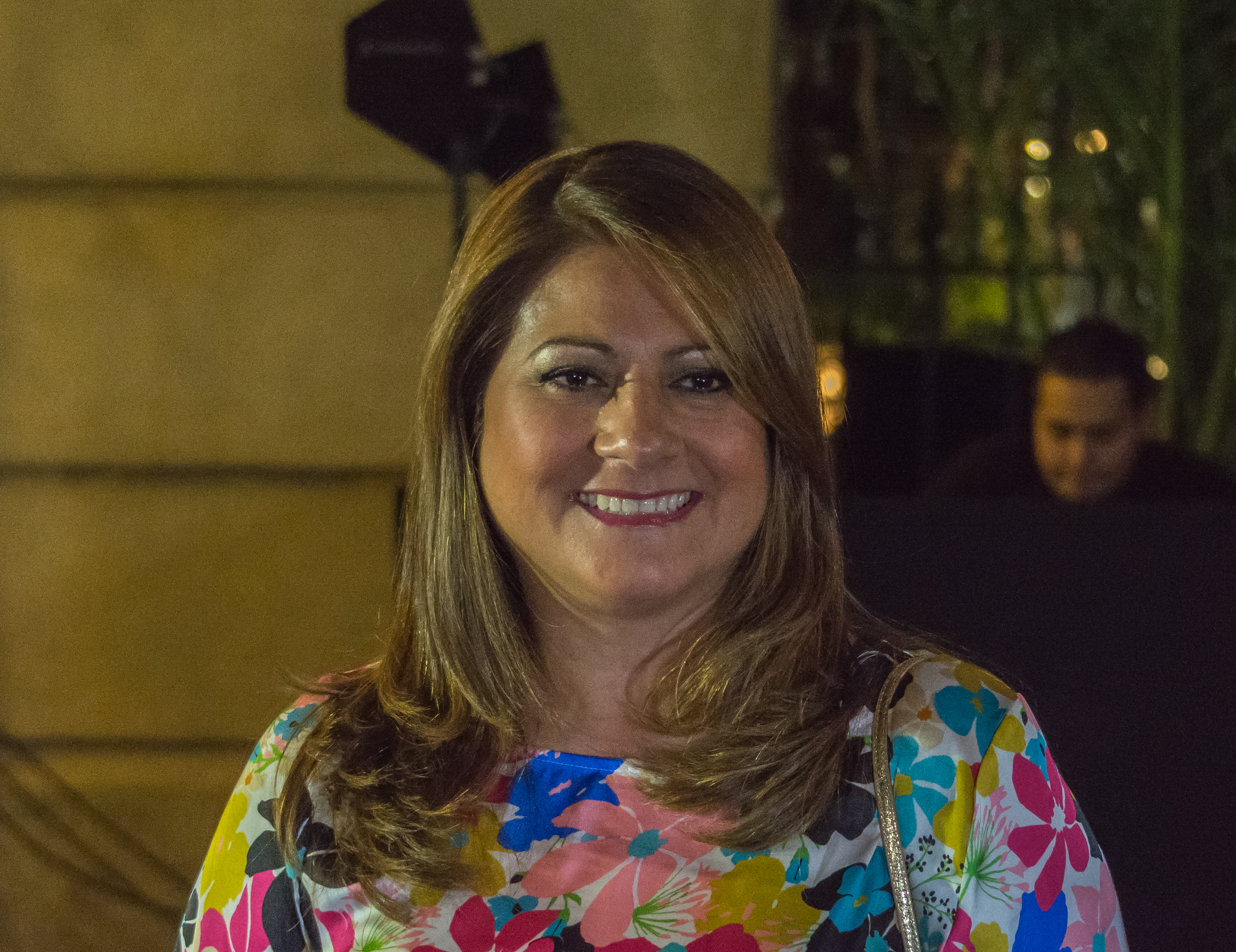
- Born: Natalia Milena Cuevas Tapia; 18 March 1966 (age 60); Santiago, Chile
- Occupations: Singer, comedian, impressionist, actress
- Awards: APES Award (1996)

Natalia Milena Cuevas Tapia (born 18 March 1966) is a Chilean singer, comedian, impressionist, and actress.

== Biography ==
Natalia Cuevas studied dance at the Municipal Theatre of Santiago for two years. She also took a course in vocal techniques and singing at the Alicia Puccio Academy. While still at school, she participated as a singer in several television contests. After some attempts, she managed to find work as a chorister on the Canal 13 television programs Éxito and Martes 13. At the same time she worked singing jingles and was part of the University of Chile Symphony Orchestra.

She took her first steps as a comedian in the group Contratiempo. In the early 1990s she was invited onto the comic program Jappening con ja, where she appeared for two years. On the show she began to develop impressions of various singers and television personalities, such as Marta Sánchez, Eli de Caso, Myriam Hernández, and Cecilia.

In 2001 Cuevas appeared for the first time at the Viña del Mar Festival, accompanying the comedian and singer Memo Bunke. In her performance, Cuevas imitated Paloma San Basilio, Myriam Hernández, Palmenia Pizarro, and Cecilia. Both comedians received Gold and Silver Seagull awards.

The following year she participated in the Chilevisión program Calor humano. She was also invited onto Viva el lunes several times. She later joined Por fin es lunes, a Canal 13 program hosted by Antonio Vodanovic and Margot Kahl.

In 2003 she returned to the Viña del Mar Festival, this time solo. In her routine she played Marjorie, a character of her own creation that she had shown for the first time on Jappening con ja. In her performance she also imitated Cecilia, Patricia Maldonado, Gloria Simonetti, Palmenia Pizarro, Shakira, Thalía, and Myriam Hernandez. Cuevas was awarded a silver torch. In 2004 she reappeared at Viña del Mar, but did not achieve the success of previous years. The comedian was nervous and abandoned her routine earlier than expected.

In 2012 she participated in the Canal 13 program Mi nombre es… VIP, where she imitated the singer Cecilia. The following year she appeared at the Antofagasta Festival, imitating President Michelle Bachelet.

She is currently working on comic imitations and sketches on the program Morandé con compañía.

== Private life ==
In March 2013, she revealed through an interview with the television program Bienvenidos that during her childhood she was sexually abused by a priest. According to Cuevas, she had not come forward because, "the child always believes that he is provoking this situation, so he feels afraid to confess it, because he thinks that he will be challenged or punished."

== Filmography ==
- 2003 – Cesante, directed by Ricardo Amunátegui

== Awards ==
- 1996 – APES Award, for her contribution to humor
