= Hotel O'Higgins =

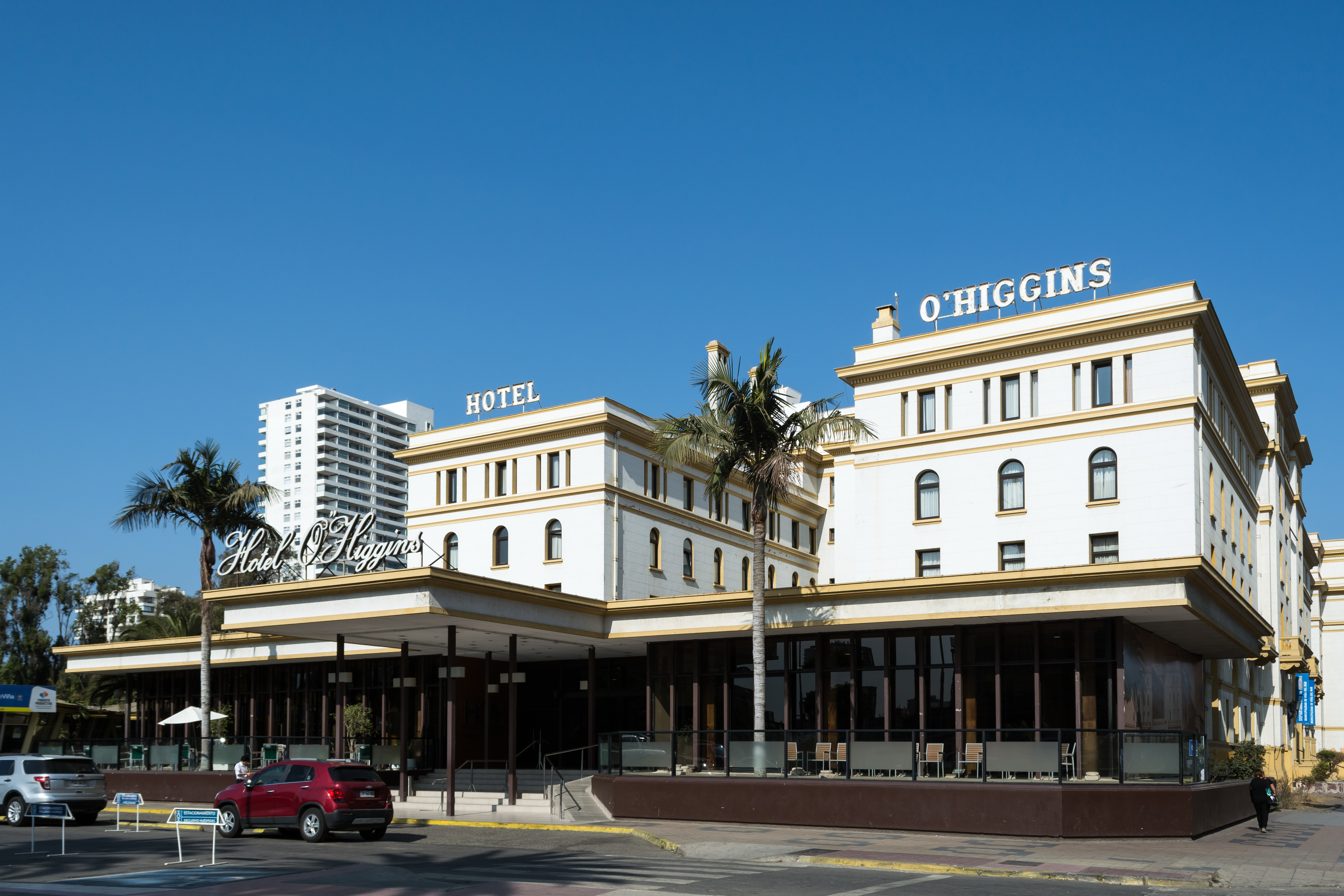
- Interactive map of the Hotel O'Higgins area
- Hotel chain: Panamericana Hoteles

General information
- Location: Plaza Vergara, Viña del Mar, Chile
- Coordinates: 33.02385°S 71.55089°W
- Named for: Bernardo O'Higgins
- Opened: February 1936

Technical details
- Floor count: 5

Design and construction
- Architects: Vicente Collovich, Fernando Silva, Arnaldo Barison

Other information
- Number of rooms: 244
- Number of suites: 12

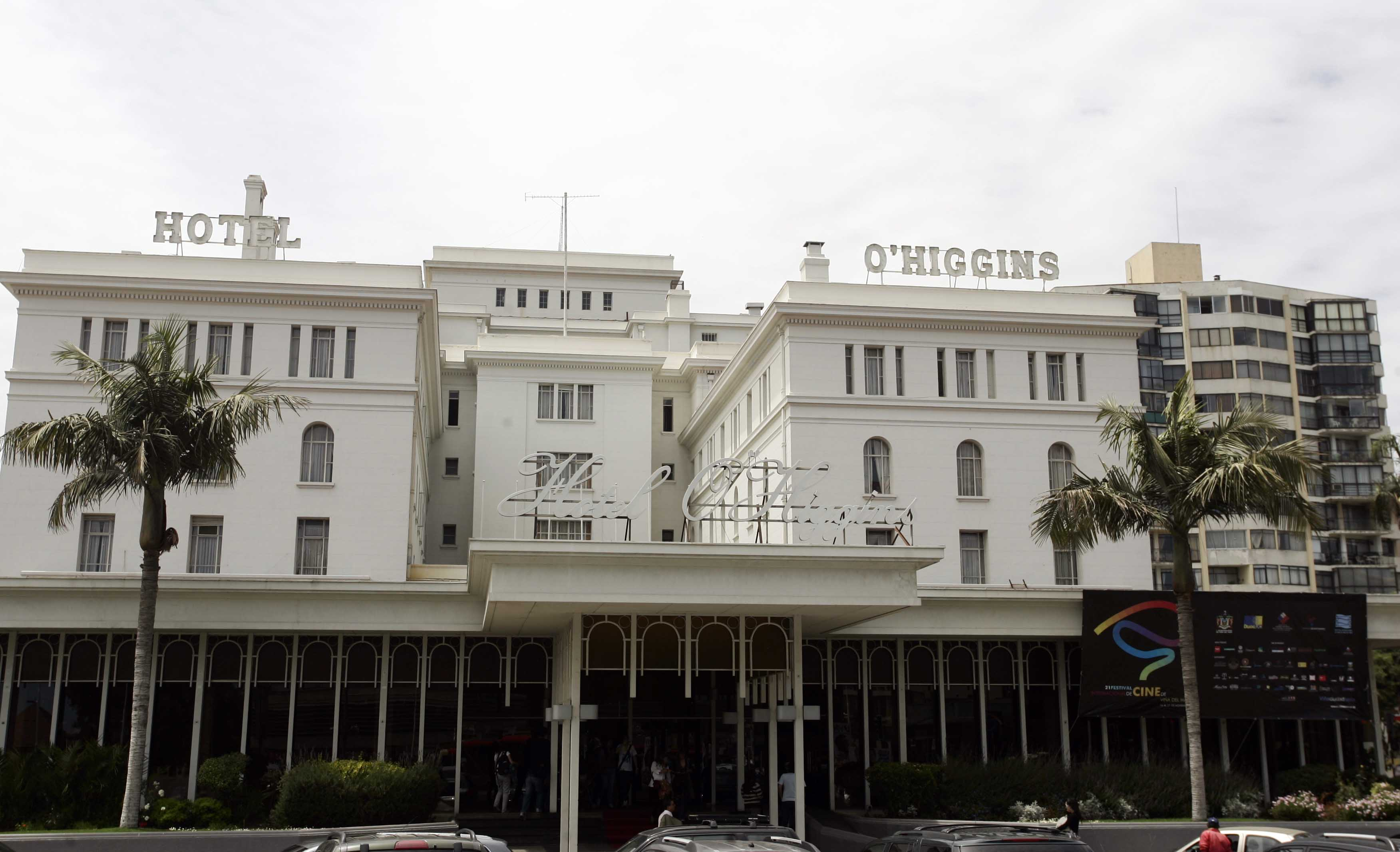
Facade of the hotel

The Hotel O'Higgins was the oldest hotel in the city of Viña del Mar in Chile's Valparaíso Region, with 270 rooms. It is located in front of Plaza Latorre, in the center of the city. It is owned by the municipality and was managed by Panamericana Hoteles until it closed in 2020.

== History ==
The municipality of Viña began its construction in 1931, with a design by the architects Vicente Collovich, Fernando Silva, and Arnaldo Barison. It was funded by the enactment of Law No. 4283 by President Carlos Ibáñez del Campo in 1928, which also helped to build the Miramar Hotel and the Municipal Casino. It was formally inaugurated in February 1936, and since then its structure has undergone several changes, such as the opening of the main entrance on Plaza Latorre, which replaced the existing one on Arlegui Street.

For several decades, the hotel served as the hostel for artists participating in the Viña del Mar International Song Festival, and until 2006 it was the official lodging for the artists. It was then displaced by new hotels in the city, such as the Sheraton Miramar. Social meetings, events, and international conventions have also been held at the hotel.

After the earthquake of 2010, the hotel refitted one of its main lounges to host shows for the Municipal Theater while it was being repaired. That same year saw the beginning of the hotel's renovation, which included the construction of a convention center within the complex.

The hotel closed in 2020 due to the COVID-19 pandemic. It served as a quarantine site, and in 2022 as a shelter for survivors of nearby forest fires. The vacant hotel's fittings and furniture were sold at auction in September 2022. In 2024, it was used as a tetanus vaccination center, for volunteers working on cleanup after the 2024 fires. In October 2024, the city announced plans for a feasibility study for the renovation of the hotel, but the study was cancelled in 2025. In 2025, the building was used as the temporary offices of the city Transit Department.
