= Carla Ochoa =

Chilean show woman (born 1979)

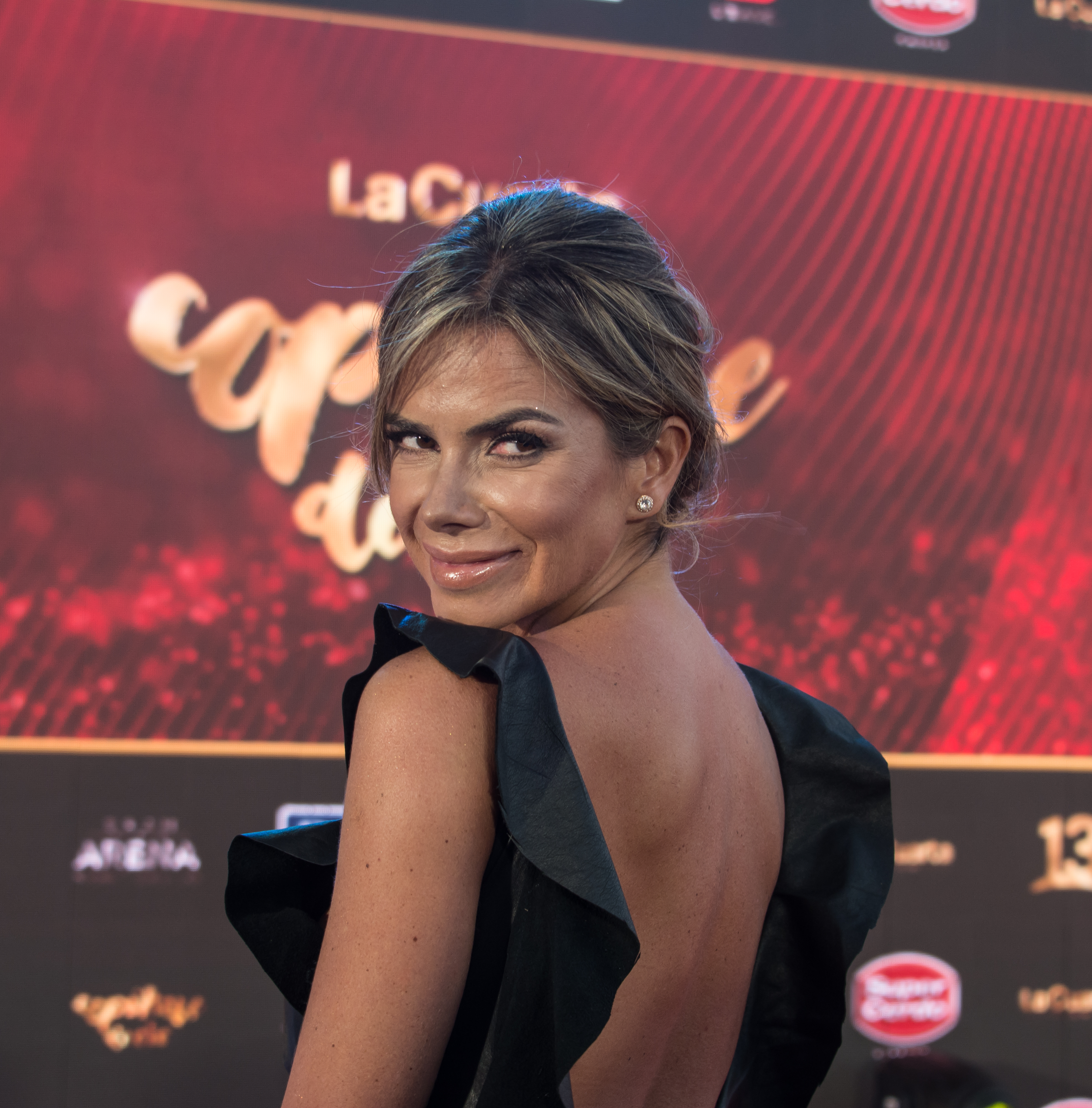
- Born: Carla Fernanda Ochoa Peñailillo; March 21, 1979 (age 46); Santiago
- Height: 5 ft 8 in (1.73 m)

Carla Fernanda Ochoa Peñailillo (born March 21, 1979, in Santiago) is a Chilean show woman who participated in Miss Chile. In 2007, she won the contest Queen of the Pampilla Festival in Coquimbo. As a show woman, she has appeared in television shows like Morandé con Compañía and Mekano. She also appeared in the extreme reality show Pelotón.

She is close friend of the ex-Miss Chile Isabel Bawlitza and of her fellow ex-contestant of Pelotón, Mariela Montero. At 26 years old, Ochoa gave birth to a girl named Josefa. In February 2010, Carla participated for the 2010 Viña del Mar International Song Festival's queen election, where she obtained the 2nd place, the winner was Carolina Arregui.
