= Indio Pícaro =

Traditional Chilean statuette

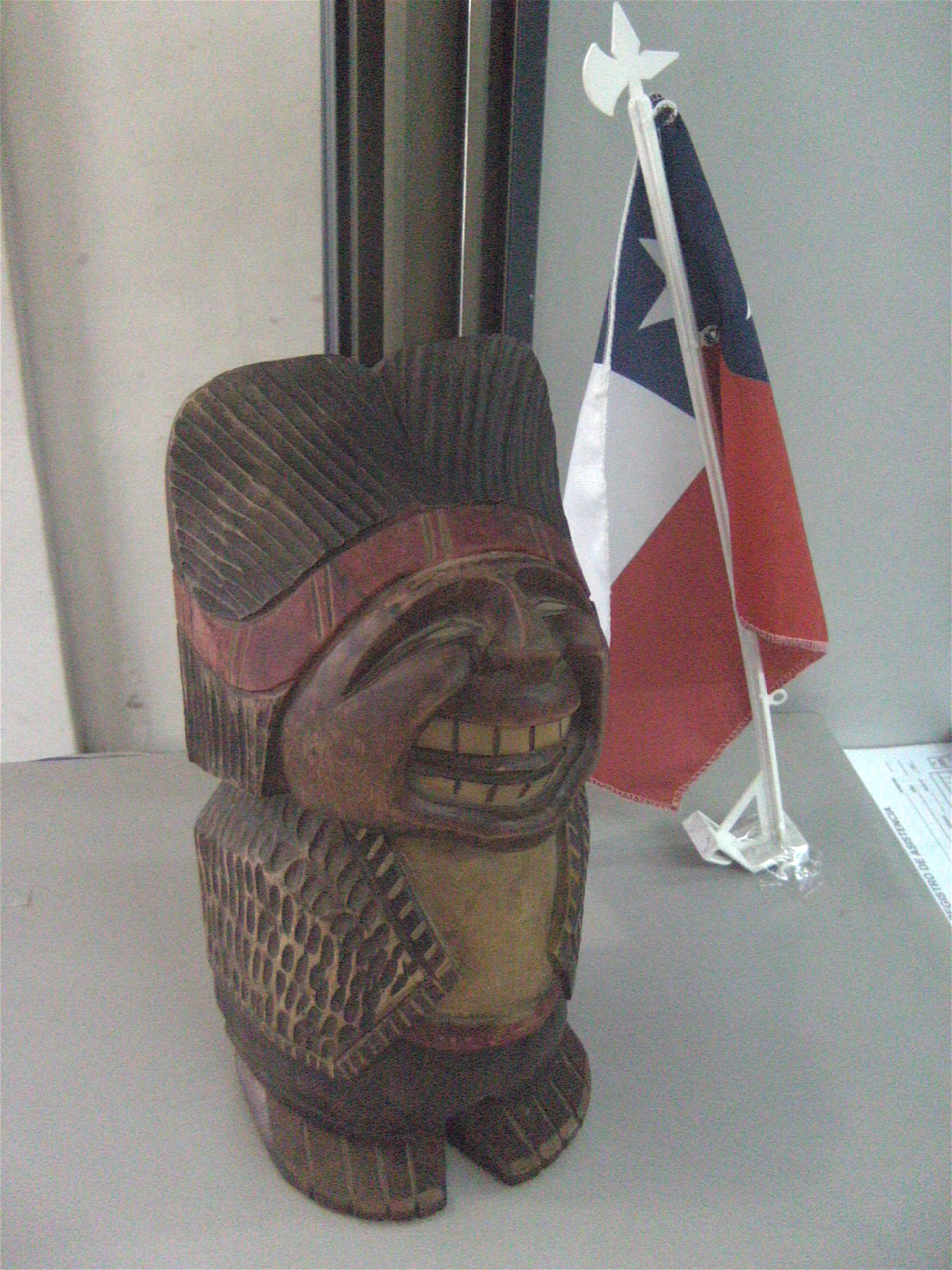
An indio pícaro

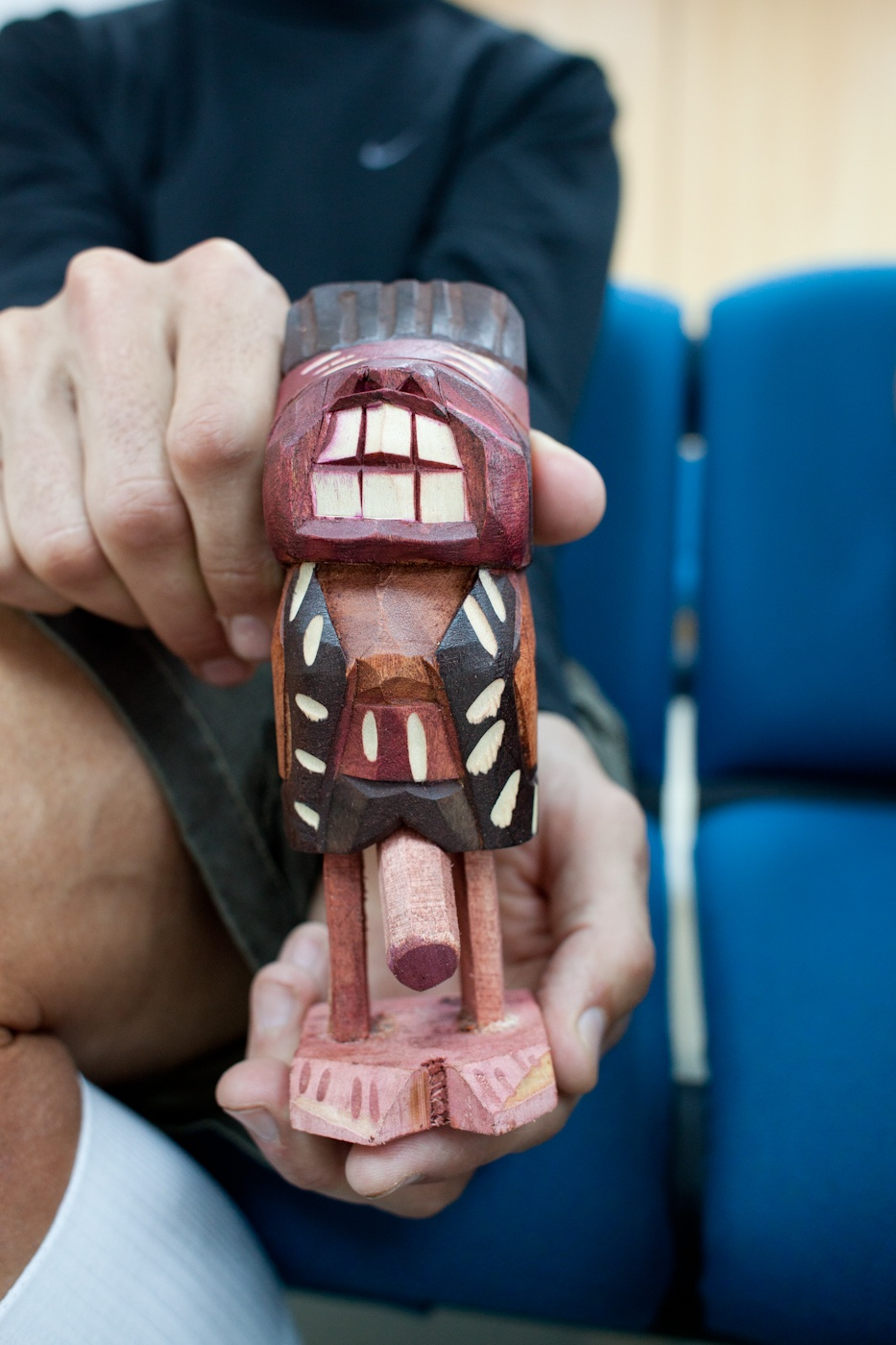
An indio pícaro when lifted

The indio pícaro (saucy Indian) is a traditional Chilean wooden statuette referencing a Mapuche Indian with a broad smile that, when the body is lifted, shows an erect penis or pubic hair (Guacolda or india pícara). The indio pícaro is found in traditional artisan shops in south-central Chile. It is usually made of wood, and generally viewed as a gag gift or joke, sometimes as decoration.

Some sources cite that the indio pícaro was created in 1980 by Jorge Medina Ramirez, a self-taught artisan who along with his friends - and as a challenge to their boss - had to copy a doll Apache articulated in a way that hid their "attributes" under a loincloth, to send as a joke to a friend in Santiago. Over time it gained fame, Medina received a large number of orders, and he decided to manufacture a series.

In 1990 the Vice President of the United States, Dan Quayle bought several of these statues in Casablanca, in a fact captured by the Chilean and foreign press. Eventually the statuette became known internationally, and has even made an appearance at the White House.

These statuettes, which generally do not exceed 15 centimetres (5.9 in) in height, began to be sold in Santiago in the early 1990s and quickly became popular. The municipal market of Temuco sold large quantities of this figure for their identity with the Mapuche people; in this market you can find carved figures that exceed 1.5 metres (4 ft 11 in) in height. The humor of the statue lies partly in the fact that what at first appears to be the craftwork of pre-Columbian indigenous people, carved by hand, when lifted (to get a better look of the work) "surprises" the viewer by revealing the statue's genitalia - and the reason for the Indian's mischievous smile.
