= Denisse Malebrán =

Chilean singer, songwriter and vocalist

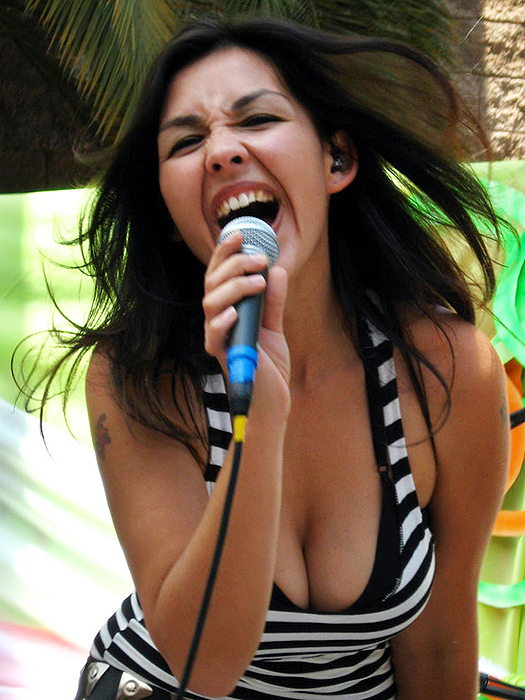
- Denisse Malebrán singing
- Born: Denisse Alejandra Malebrán Soto; 28 May 1976 (age 49); Santiago, Chile
- Occupations: musician; singer; songwriter
- Years active: 1995–present
- Children: Antonia Rojas Malebrán; Emilia Ahumada Malebrán; Marisol Cuello Malebrán
- Musical career
- Genres: Rock; pop
- Instruments: Vocals; guitar

Denisse Alejandra Malebrán Soto, known as Denisse Malebrán (28 May 1976, Santiago), is a Chilean singer, songwriter and vocalist. She is member of the synthpop band, Saiko. She was a contestant on Dancing with the Stars.

== Studio albums ==
- Maleza (2007)
- Pagana (2009)
- Mi Caravana (2011)
