= La Noche =

Chilean musical group

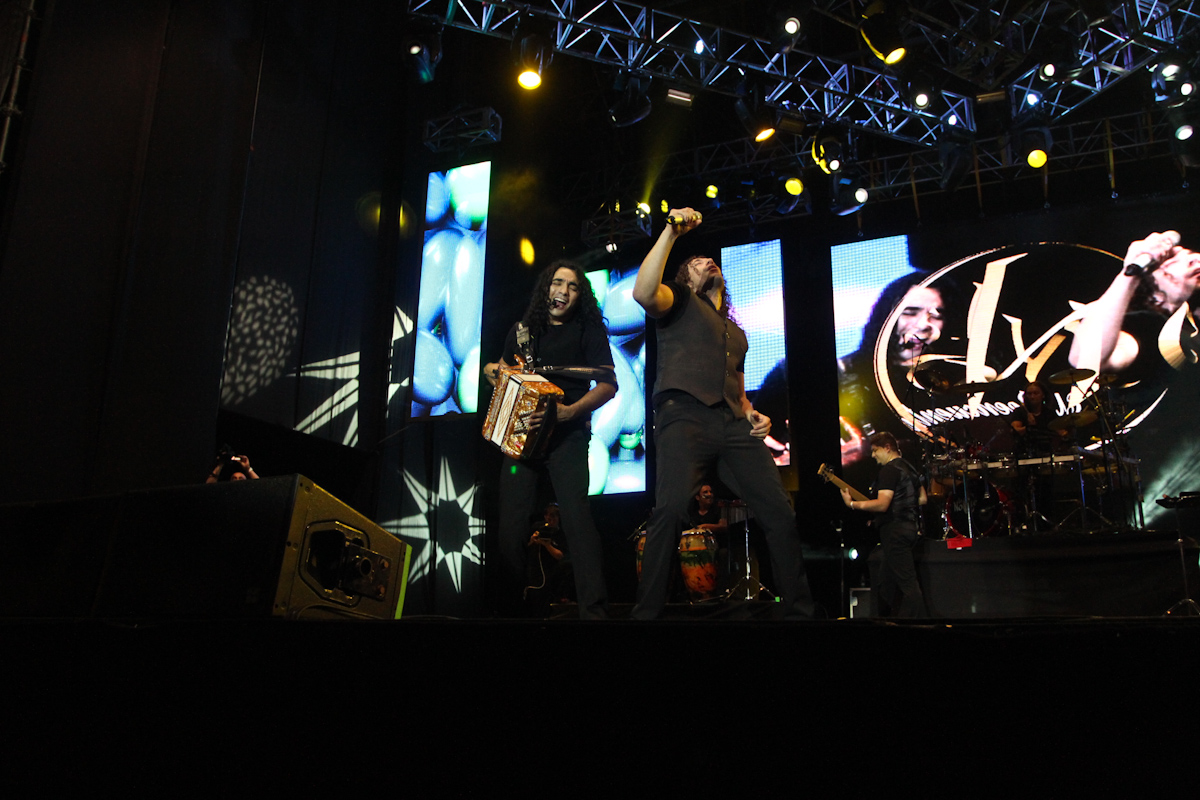
- Live concert by La Noche in 2012

Background information
- Origin: Catemu, Chile
- Genre: Cumbia
- Years active: 2000–2002, (2006–present)
- Members: Gabriel Morales; Alexis Morales sergio taby morales chanchito pincheira cristian ciego Berrios diego congas Dominic di coco Director Musical Alexitico
- Past members: Leo Rey; Paulo César; Andrés Serrano; Yoan Amor; René Valentino Brizuela; Esteban Godoy; Michael Dávila; Alexis Hidalgo; Isaac Jammett; Fernando Ahumada; Miguel Pavez; Juan Bustamante; Jorge Desidel; Daniel Chamorro; Cesar Neira; John Rivera; Pablo Ortiz; Jorge "Koke" Cabrera; Hernán Ramírez
- Website: www.grupolanoche.cl

La Noche is a Chilean cumbia band founded in 2000. It was one of the most popular tropical music bands in Chile in the first decade of the 2000s. The band's first commercial hit was the 2006 album Amor entre sábanas, followed by En tu cuarto in 2008. As of 2026, composer Alexis Morales remains with the band.

== Discography ==
Studio albums

- 2000: Pasión caliente
- 2001: Te Lo Dice
- 2006: Amor Entre Sabanas
- 2008: En tu cuarto
- 2009: La Noche Buena
- 2010: Sígueme
- 2014: Habitación 106

Live albums

- 2007: En Vivo
- 2009: En Vivo (Viña 2009)
- 2012: El Reencuentro

DVDs

- 2007: En Vivo
- 2009: La Noche Karaoke
- 2009: En Vivo (Viña 2009)

== See also ==
- New Chilean Cumbia
