= Leo Rey =

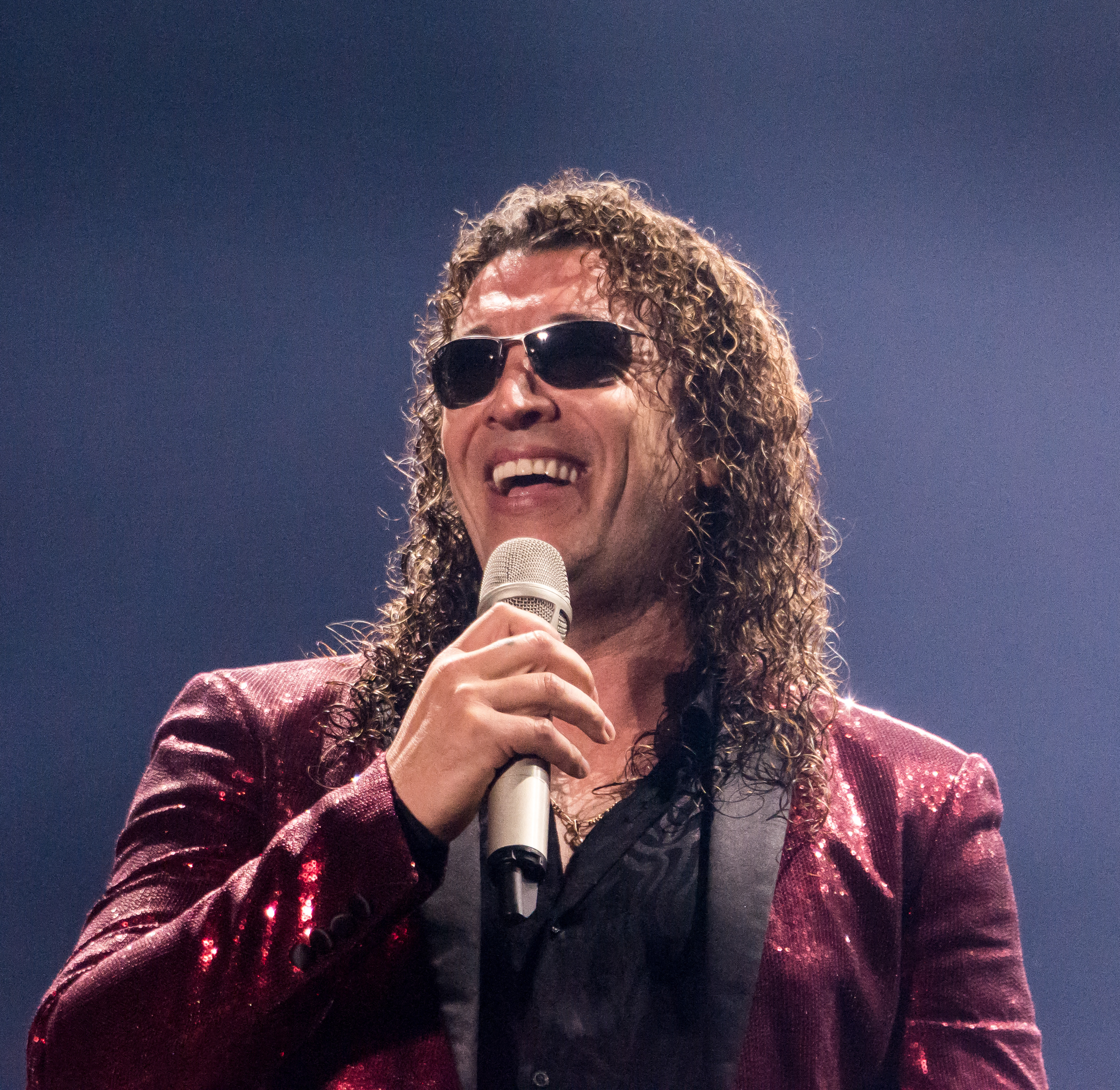
- Leo Rey in 2020

Background information
- Also known as: Leo Rey, Kung Leo
- Born: Cecil Leonardo Leiva Reyes; November 30, 1979 (age 46); Viña del Mar, Chile
- Origin: Catemu, Chile
- Genres: Tropical, cumbia
- Occupation: Singer
- Instruments: Voice, guitar
- Years active: 2006–present
- Website: www.leorey.cl

Cecil Leonardo Leiva Reyes (Viña del Mar, November 30, 1979) known artistically as Leo Rey (derived from the abbreviation of his middle name and maternal surname), is a Chilean singer and songwriter of Chilean cumbia and tropical music.

He is best known for having been the lead singer of the music group La Noche from 2005 to 2010 and again from 2012 to 2013, with whom he recorded three albums. He is also a competitive Mortal Kombat player, having won multiple national tournaments under the pseudonym Kung Leo.
