= Saiko (band) =

Chilean synth-pop and pop rock band

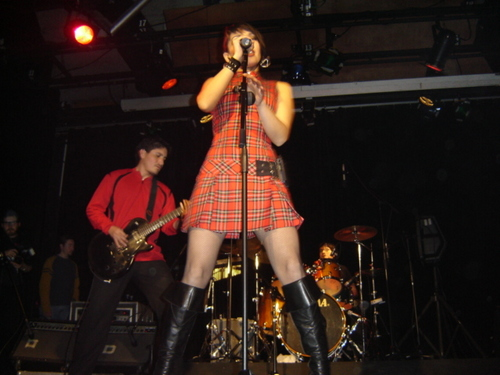
- Saiko performing in 2005

Background information
- Origin: Santiago, Chile
- Genres: Pop rock; synth-pop
- Years active: 1999–present
- Labels: EMI; La Oreja; Escarabajo; Oveja Negra; Plaza Independencia; Saiko
- Members: Denisse Malebrán; Luciano Rojas; Mario Barrueto
- Past members: Marcela Thais; Iván Delgado; Esteban Torres; Marcel Torres; Jorge Martínez; Javier Torres; Paulo Ahumada; Rodrigo Aboitiz; Roberto Bosch; Carlos Azócar; Alejandro Salazar; Mauricio Clavería
- Website: www.saiko.cl

Saiko is a Chilean synth-pop and pop rock band established in the late 1990s. Throughout their career they have achieved great notoriety in the musical Chilean scene, largely due to the charisma, image and voice of their vocalist, Denisse Malebrán, and the musical talent and experience of Rodrigo "Coti" Aboitiz and Luciano Rojas, both former members and founders of the Chilean group La Ley. To date they have released seven studio albums: Informe Saiko (1999), Campos finitos (2001), Todo Saiko (2003), Las horas (2004), Volar (2007), Trapecio (2013) and Lengua Muerta (2017).

== History ==
In 1998, musician Luciano Rojas left the band La Ley and met Rodrigo Aboitiz, another former member of the band in Mexico City with the intention of creating a new musical project. Both musicians returned to Santiago, Chile, where they joined with Iván Delgado other musician who was part of the band La Ley in its beginnings, perform a casting to hire a female singer to form a new band, the selected is the singer Denisse Malebrán, who had studies of singing, and formed part of the emerging bands Turbomente and Polaroid.

== Members ==
Current members

- Denisse Malebrán – frontwoman (1999–2007, 2012–present)
- Luciano Rojas – bass, guitar (1999–present)
- Mario Barrueto – drums (2019–present)

Former members

- Iván Delgado – keyboards (1999–2002)
- Javier Torres – drums, percussion (2004–2011)
- Esteban Torres – bass (2004–2011)
- Jorge Martínez – bass (2004–2005)
- Marcela Castro Thais – frontwoman (2007–2012)
- Paulo Ahumada – guitar (2012–2016)
- Rodrigo Aboitiz – synthesizer (1999–2003, 2012–2016)
- Roberto Bosch – drums, percussion (2012–2019)
- Carlos Azócar – guitar (2016–2019)
- Mauricio Claveria – drums, percussion (2019)

== Discography ==
Studio albums

- Informe Saiko (1999)
- Campos Finitos (2001)
- Las Horas (2004)
- Volar (2007)
- Trapecio (2013)
- Lengua Muerta (2017)
- Drama (2023)

Live albums

- Saiko Blondie 2005 (2006)
- Sigo Quemando Infinitos (2017)

Compilation albums

- Todo Saiko (2003)
