= María Eugenia Larraín =

Chilean model (born 1973)

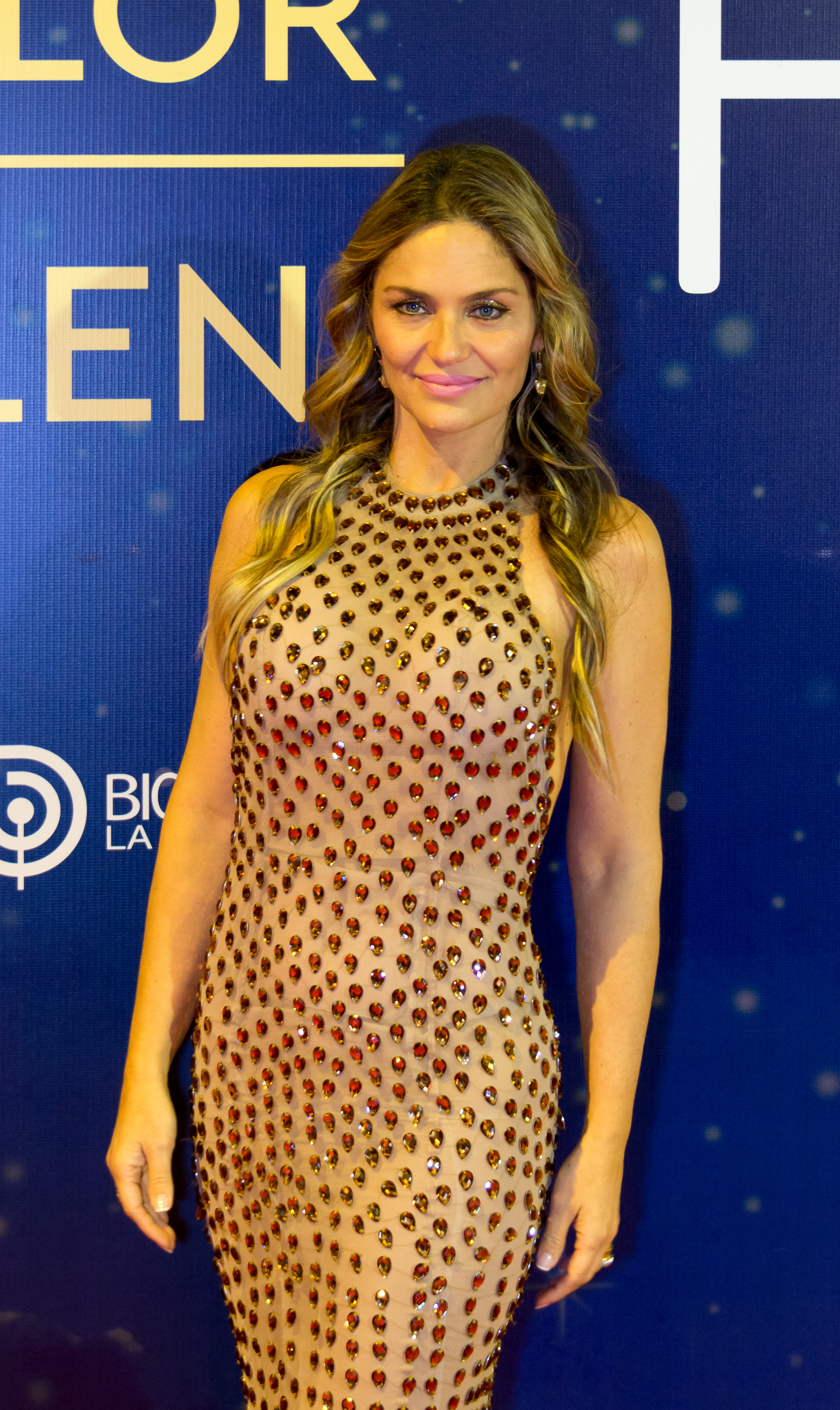
- Larraín in 2019
- Born: Kenita Larraín; October 16, 1973 (age 52); Santiago, Chile
- Education: Liceo Experimental Manuel de Salas
- Occupations: Model; singer; engineer; socialite; exotic dancer
- Spouses: Marcelo Ríos (m. 2005; div. 2008) Sergio Ader (m. 2015)
- Children: 1

María Eugenia Larraín Calderón (born October 16, 1973), known as Kenita (or Quenita) Larraín, is a Chilean model and socialite.

== Early life and education ==
Larraín was born on October 16, 1973 in Santiago. She is the daughter of Patricia Calderón Terán and Mario Larraín Corssen, granddaughter of Mario Larraín del Campo and Javiera Corssen Rivera and great-granddaughter Ricardo Larraín Bravo, descendant of the 1st Marquess of Larraín. Larraín is of Basque descent.

She studied at Liceo Manuel de Salas in Ñuñoa, Santiago Province. She studied business administration at UNIACC University graduating in 2003.

== Career ==
In 2008 Larraín participated in the Argentine television show Bailando por un Sueño and in 2009 joined the Chilean reality show Pelotón VIP with her twin brother Mario Larraín. She was first runner-up. In 2011 she starred in the music video of Evailo ("Moya E"), a Bulgarian singer known in Chile for competing in the TV show Yingo. In November 2011 released her first single "Mi Mundo Sin Ti," a cover version of the song by Spanish singer Soraya Arnelas.

In January 2023, it was announced that a theatrical play would be developed about Larraín's life as Kenita. Original music by Camila Moreno, and will be performed at the Gabriela Mistral Cultural Center, with a premiere date for November 2023.

== Personal life ==
She was married to tennis player Marcelo Ríos. In 2005, she was in a serious car accident due to an oversight by Ríos, which resulted in their separation.

In 2015 she married businessman Sergio Ader, with whom she has a son.

== TV appearances ==
- Tarde Millonaria (Canal 13)
- Sal y Pimienta (Mega)
- Futgol (Canal 13)
- Sin Barrera (Chilevisión)
- Sábado Gigante (Canal 13)
- Para eso estamos (Canal 13)
- Zoom Deportivo (TVN)
- Morandé con Compañía (Mega)
- Noche de Juegos (TVN)
- Viva la mañana (Canal 13)
- SQP (Chilevisión)
- Pollo en Conserva (Red Televisión)
- Un amor indomable (ATV, Peru)
- El baile en TVN (TVN)
- Astros de la risa (Panamericana Televisión, Peru)
- Bailando por un Sueño 2008 (Canal 13, Argentina)
- Pelotón VIP (TVN)
- Fiebre de Baile 3 (CHV)
- La Barra del Mundial (TVN)
