= Difuntos Correa =

Chilean rock band

- Origin: Santiago, Chile
- Genres: Rock en español, and Nueva canción influences
- Instruments: Guitar, Bass, Drums, Sax
- Labels: EMI, Alerce, Plaza Independencia thumbnail
- Members: Sergio Gómez; Miguel Rodríguez; Joaquin Valdivieso; Dan Zamora
- Past members: Andrés Olivos; César Fuentes; Erasmo Menares; Sergio Carlini; Carlos Gómez
- Website: difuntoscorrea.cl

Difuntos Correa (lit. "Deceased Correa") is a Chilean rock band. The band was formed in Santiago de Chile in 2003. On June 10, 2008, the band began its first international tour, to Spain, France and Sweden.

== Members ==
=== Current members ===
- Sergio "Checho" Gómez, guitar and vocals (2003–present)
- Dan Zamora, rhythm guitar (2013–present)
- Joaquín Valdivieso, saxophone, flute, and bongo (2003–2009; 2013–present)
- Miguel Rodríguez, bass (2003–2010; 2013–present)

=== Past members ===
- Andrés Olivos, vocals and rhythm guitar (2003–2012).
- Erasmo Menares, trumpet (2003–2012).
- César Fuentes, trombone (2003–2012).
- Sergio Carlini, percussion (2011).
- Carlos Gómez, drummer (2003–2024).

, ElGaragePresenta.com.mx</ref>

- Carlos Gómez, drummer (2003–2024).

== Discography ==
- 2004 Tramposo amor
- 2006 Resucitando la fe en un beso fatal
- 2009 Ilusionismo
- 2013 El Aprendiz
