= List of performing artists at the Viña del Mar International Song Festival =

The Viña del Mar International Song Festival (Spanish: Festival Internacional de la Canción de Viña del Mar) is a music festival that is considered the best and biggest in Latin America and the most important musical event in the Americas which is held annually on the 3rd week of February since 1960 in Viña del Mar, Chile.

== 1960 ==
| Artist | Country | Day | Prizes |
|---|---|---|---|
| Armando Palacios | Chile | | |
| Carlos Helo | Chile | | |
| Jorge Romero "Firulete" | Chile | | |
| Los Huasos Quincheros | Chile | | |
| Los Perlas | Chile | | |
| Luis Sandrini | Argentina | | |
| Manolo González | Chile | | |
| Ricardo Arancibia | Mexico | | |
| Teal Joy | Japan | | |

== 1961 ==
| Artist | Country | Day | Prizes |
|---|---|---|---|
| Baby Bell | Argentina | | |
| Dixieland Hot Jazz | | | |
| Jorge Romero "Firulete" | Chile | | |
| Lorenzo Valderrama | Chile | | |
| Los Caporales | Chile | | |
| Lucho Navarro | Chile | | |
| Orquesta Huambaly | Chile | | |

== 1962 ==
| Artist | Country | Day | Prizes |
|---|---|---|---|
| Carlos Helo | Chile | | |
| El Chúcaro | Argentina | | |
| Los Hermanos Silva | Chile | | |
| Los Ramblers | Chile | | |
| Telma y Williams | | | |
| Antonio Prieto | Chile | Domingo 25 February | |

== 1963 ==
| Artist | Country | Day | Prizes |
|---|---|---|---|
| Carlos Helo | Chile | | |
| Chocolate | Chile | | |
| Enrique Guzmán | Venezuela-Mexico | | |
| Gloria Benavides | Chile | | |
| Lorenzo Valderrama | Chile | | |
| Los Habana | Cuba | | |
| Los Perlas | Chile | | |
| The Strangers | Chile | | |

== 1964 ==
| Artist | Country | Day | Prizes |
|---|---|---|---|
| Carlos Helo | Chile | | |
| Lorenzo Valderrama | Chile | | |
| Los Blue Splendor | Chile | | |
| Los Cantores de Rucamanqui | Chile | | |
| Manolo González | Chile | | |
| Dúo Karmarú | | Wednesday 19 February (cambio de show) | |
| Nahuel | Argentina | Wednesday 19 February (cambio de show) | |
| Maggie | Chile | Wednesday 19 February (cambio de show) | |

== 1965 ==
| Artist | Country | Day | Prizes |
|---|---|---|---|
| Carlos Helo | Chile | | |
| Chabuca Granda | Peru | | |
| Gloria Benavides | Chile | | |
| Héctor Gagliardi | Argentina | | |
| Jorge Romero "Firulete" | Chile | | |
| Las Cuatro Brujas | Chile | | |
| Los Hermanos Campos | Chile | | |
| Los Tigres | Chile | | |
| Manolo González | Chile | | |
| Monna Bell | Chile | | |
| Pat Henry | Chile | | |

== 1966 ==
| Artist | Country | Day | Prizes |
|---|---|---|---|
| Dúo Dinámico | Spain | | |
| Ennio Sangiusto | Italy | | |
| Ferran Alabert | Chile | | |
| Jorge Romero "Firulete" | Chile | | |
| Los Caporales | Chile | | |
| Los Flamingos Mexicanos | Mexico | | |
| Los Huasos Quincheros | Chile | | |

== 1967 ==
| Artist | Country | Day | Prizes |
|---|---|---|---|
| Ennio Sangiusto | Italy | | |
| Ferran Alabert | Chile | | |
| Jorge Romero "Firulete" | Chile | | |
| Los Hermanos Ríos | Mexico | | |
| Los Jockers | Chile | | |
| Massiel | Spain | | |
| Os Pagaos | Brazil | | |
| Pedro Messone | Chile | | |

== 1968 ==
| Artist | Country | Day | Prizes |
|---|---|---|---|
| Armando Manzanero | Mexico | | |
| Bric a Brac | Chile | | |
| Chicho Gordillo | Spain | | |
| Gloria Benavides | Chile | | |
| Jorge Romero "Firulete" | Chile | | |
| Pat Henry | Chile | | |
| Los Diablos Azules | Chile | | |
| Patricia Sanders | Chile | | |
| Patricio Morán | Chile | | |
| Sandro | Argentina | | |
| Trio Irakitán | Brazil | | |

== 1969 ==
| Artist | Country | Day | Prizes |
|---|---|---|---|
| Dúo Dinámico | Spain | | |
| Fórmula V | Spain | | |
| Jimmy Cliff | Jamaica | | |
| Julio Iglesias | Spain | | |
| Leonardo Favio | Argentina | | |
| Jorge Romero (humorist) | Chile | | |
| Lucho Navarro | Chile | | |
| Mirtha Pérez | Venezuela | | |
| Romuald | France | | |
| Ricardo Arancibia | Mexico | | |
| Bárbara y Dick | Argentina | | |
| Bric a Brac | Chile | | |

== 1970 ==
| Artist | Country | Day | Prizes |
|---|---|---|---|
| Joan Manuel Serrat | Spain | | |
| Carlos Helo | Chile | | |
| Raúl Labié | Argentina | | |
| The Tremeloes | United Kingdom | | |
| Dino Traverso | Chile | | |
| Chicho Gordillo | Spain | | |
| Los Huasos Quincheros | Chile | | |
| Paolo Salvatore | Chile-Italy | | |
| Gila | Spain | | |
| Piero | Italy-Argentina | | |

== 1971 ==
| Artist | Country | Day | Prizes |
|---|---|---|---|
| Nicola di Bari | Italy | | |
| Nino Bravo | Spain | | |
| Jorge Romero "Firulete" | Chile | | |
| Bigote Arrocet | Chile | | Gaviota de Plata |
| Los Blops | Chile | | |
| Cuncumén | Chile | | |
| Rudy Hernández | Chile | | |
| Las Satánicas | Czechoslovakia | | |

== 1972 ==
| Artist | Country | Day | Prizes |
|---|---|---|---|
| Piero | Argentina | | |
| Tormenta | Argentina | | |
| Victor Heredia | Argentina | | |
| Miriam Makeba | South Africa | | |
| Joan Manuel Serrat | Spain | | |
| Los Iracundos | Uruguay | | |
| Peter Yarrow | United States | | |
| Maitén Montenegro | Chile | | |
| Pepe Gallinato | Argentina | | |
| Euson | Netherlands-Aruba | | Gaviota de Plata |
| Coco Legrand | Chile | | |
| Bigote Arrocet | Chile | | |

== 1973 ==
| Artist | Country | Day | Prizes |
|---|---|---|---|
| Pucará | Chile | | |
| Tato Cifuentes | Chile | | |
| Los Perlas | Chile | | |
| Tony Ronald | Netherlands-Spain | | |
| Julio Iglesias | Spain | | |
| Quilapayún | Chile | | |
| Sergio Feito | Chile | | |
| Illapu | Chile | | |
| Los Huasos Quincheros | Chile | | |
| Gino Renni | Italy-Argentina | | |
| Pachi y Pablo | Chile | | |

== 1974 ==
| Artist | Country | Day | Prizes |
|---|---|---|---|
| Camilo Sesto | Spain | | |
| Nydia Caro | Puerto Rico | | |
| Jeanette | United Kingdom | | |
| Pepe Gallinato | Argentina | | |
| Música Libre | Chile | | |
| Gloria Simonetti | Chile | | |
| Tato Cifuentes | Chile | | |
| Maitén Montenegro | Chile | | |
| Los Perlas | Chile | | |
| Bigote Arrocet | Chile | | |
| Los Acetatos | Chile | | |
| Antonio Prieto | Chile | | |

== 1975 ==
| Artist | Country | Day | Prizes |
|---|---|---|---|
| Sandro | Argentina | | |
| Manolo Galván | Spain | | |
| Emilio Jose | Spain | | |
| Julio Iglesias | Spain | | |
| Roberto Carlos | Brazil | | |
| Los Caporales | Chile | | |
| Conjunto Malibú | Chile | | |
| Coco Legrand | Chile | | |
| Maitén Montenegro | Chile | | |

== 1976 ==
| Artist | Country | Day | Prizes |
|---|---|---|---|
| Mari Trini | Spain | | |
| Juan Bau | Spain | | |
| Manolo Galván | Spain | | |
| Chicho Gordillo | Spain | | |
| Osvaldo Dayz | Chile | | |
| Des Smyth | Ireland | | |
| Los Alfiles Negros | Argentina | | |
| Los Muleros | Chile | | |
| Sissi Lobato | Argentina | | |
| Los Perlas | Chile | | |
| Bigote Arrocet | Chile | | |
| Eber Lobato | Argentina | | |
| Santa Barbara Superstar | Argentina | | |
| Conjunto Malibú | Chile | | |

== 1977 ==
| Artist | Country | Day | Prizes |
|---|---|---|---|
| Julio Iglesias | Spain | | |
| Sergio y Estíbaliz | Spain | | |
| Manolo Otero | Spain | | |
| Luis Dimas | Chile | | |
| Trigo Limpio | Spain | | |
| Gloria Benavides | Chile | | |
| Coco Legrand | Chile | | |
| Los Muleros | Chile | | |
| Barrabás | Spain | | |
| Al Bano | Italy | | |
| Romina Power | United States/Italy | | |
| Albert Hammond | United Kingdom/Spain | | |

== 1978 ==
| Artist | Country | Day | Prizes |
|---|---|---|---|
| Pablo Abraira | Spain | | |
| Chabuca Granda | Peru | | |
| Albert Hammond | United Kingdom-Spain | | |
| The Hues Corporation | United States | | |
| Frecuencia Mod | Chile | | |
| Katunga | Argentina | | |
| Ronco Retes | Chile | | |
| Bigote Arrocet | Chile | | |
| Manolo González | Chile | | |
| Ray Conniff | United States | | |
| Ricardo Ceratto | Argentina | | |
| Iva Zanicchi | Italy | | |
| Pascale Petit | France | | |
| Daniel Sentacruz Ensemble | Italy | | |

== 1979 ==
| Artist | Country | Day | Prizes |
|---|---|---|---|
| Tavares | United States | | |
| Matia Bazar | Italy | | |
| Santa Esmeralda | United States | | |
| Los marismeños | Spain | | |
| Frecuencia Mod | Chile | | |
| Riccardo Cocciante | Italy | | |
| Ray Conniff | United States | | |
| Benito di Paula | Italy | | |
| Alberto Cortez | Argentina | | |
| Jorge Romero, "Firulete" | Chile | | |
| Carlos Helo | Chile | | |
| Franco Simone | Italy | | |
| Nydia Caro | Puerto Rico | | |
| Paloma San Basilio | Spain | | |
| Pedro Vargas | Mexico | | |
| Conjunto Malibú | Chile | | |

== 1980 ==
| Artist | Country | Day | Prizes |
|---|---|---|---|
| Umberto Tozzi | Italy | | |
| Neil Sedaka | United States | | |
| Gloria Gaynor | United States | | |
| José Luis Rodríguez "El Puma" | Venezuela | | |
| Rocío Jurado | Spain | | |
| Paul Mauriat | France | | |
| Antonio Prieto | Chile | | |
| Milk and Coffee | Italy | | |
| Ginette Acevedo | Chile | | |
| Coco Legrand | Chile | | |
| Juan Verdaguer | Uruguay | | |
| José Vasconcelos | Brazil | | |
| Connie Stevens | United States | | |
| The Stylistics | United States | | |
| Foxy | United States/Cuba | | |
| Joey Travolta | United States | | |
| Antonio Zabaleta | Chile | | |

== 1981 ==
| Artist | Country | Day | Prizes |
|---|---|---|---|
| Camilo Sesto | Spain | | |
| José Luis Rodríguez "El Puma" | Spain | | Gaviota de Plata |
| Ray Conniff | United States | | |
| KC and The Sunshine Band | United States | | |
| Julio Iglesias | Spain | | |
| Miguel Bosé | Spain | | Gaviota de Plata |
| Gloria Simonetti | Chile | | |
| José Alfredo Fuentes | Chile | | |
| Lucho Navarro | Chile | | |
| Los Huasos Quincheros | Chile | | |
| Jappening con Já | Chile | | |
| Mirla Castellanos | Venezuela | | |
| Leonardo Favio | Argentina | | |
| Hernaldo Zúñiga | Nicaragua | | |
| Maureen McGovern | United States | | |
| Ángela Carrasco | Dominican Republic | | |

== 1982 ==
| Artist | Country | Day | Prizes |
|---|---|---|---|
| Raphael | Spain | | |
| The Police | United Kingdom | | |
| Raúl Vale | Mexico | | |
| Franco Simone | Italy | | |
| Salvatore Adamo | Italy | | |
| Raffaella Carrá | Italy | | |
| Pecos | Spain | | |
| Pujillay | Chile | | |
| Cristóbal | Chile | | |
| Buddy Richard | Chile | | |
| Fernando Ubiergo | Chile | | |
| Óscar Andrade | Chile | | |
| Miguel Bosé | Spain | | |

== 1983 ==
| Artist | Country | Day | Prizes |
|---|---|---|---|
| Miguel Piñera | Chile | | |
| Florcita Motuda | Chile | | |
| Andrea Tessa | Chile | | |
| Los Jaivas | Chile | | |
| Zalo Reyes | Chile | | |
| José Luis Perales | Spain | | |
| Silvana Di Lorenzo | Argentina | | |
| Lucía Méndez | Mexico | | |
| Víctor Manuel | Spain | | |
| Ana Belén | Spain | | |
| Paloma San Basilio | Spain | | |
| Mirla Castellanos | Venezuela | | |
| Jairo | Argentina | | |
| Miami Sound Machine | Cuba/United States | | |
| Bucks Fizz | United Kingdom | | |
| Emmanuel | Mexico | | |
| Valerio | France | | |
| Joan Baptista Humet | Spain | | |
| Shakin' Stevens | United Kingdom | | |

== 1984 ==
| Artist | Country | Day | Prizes |
|---|---|---|---|
| José Feliciano | Puerto Rico | | |
| Andy Gibb | England | | |
| Johnny Ventura | Dominican Republic | | |
| Miguel Bosé | Spain | | |
| Daniela Romo | Mexico | | |
| Massiel | Spain | | |
| Pimpinela | Argentina | | |
| Yuri | Mexico | | Antorcha de Plata |
| José Luis Perales | Spain | | |
| Sheena Easton | Scotland | | |
| Dyango | Spain | | |
| Palito Ortega | Argentina | | |
| Ricchi e Poveri (Ricos y Pobres) | Italy | | |
| Titanic | Norway | | |
| Perla | Paraguay | | |
| Ginette Acevedo | Chile | | |
| Marcelo | Chile | | |
| Gloria Simonetti | Chile | | |
| Sebastián | Chile | | |
| Buddy Richard | Chile | | |
| Ronco Retes | Chile | | |
| Gloria Benavides | Chile | | |
| Checho Hirane | Chile | | |
| Hermógenes Conache | Chile | | |
| María Inés Naveillán | Chile | | |

== 1985 ==
| Artist | Country | Day | Prizes |
|---|---|---|---|
| Luis Miguel | Mexico | | |
| Dulce | Mexico | | |
| Amanda Miguel | Argentina | | |
| María Conchita Alonso | Cuba - Venezuela | | |
| Diego Verdaguer | Argentina | | |
| John Denver | United States | | |
| José Feliciano | Puerto Rico | | |
| Dyango | Spain | | |
| Bafona | Chile | | |
| Mirla Castellanos | Venezuela | | |
| Bravo | Spain | | |
| Rita Lee | Brazil | | |
| Maitén Montenegro | Chile | | |
| Fernando Ubiergo | Chile | | |
| Mandolino | Chile | | |
| Pujillay | Chile | | |
| Raúl di Blasio | Argentina | | |
| Miguel Gallardo | Spain | | |
| María Marta Serra Lima | Argentina | | |
| Krokus | Switzerland | | Antorcha |
| Nazareth | Scotland | | |

== 1986 ==
| Artist | Country | Day | Prizes |
|---|---|---|---|
| Sandra Mihanovich | Argentina | | |
| Alejandro Jaén | Spain | | |
| Q.E.P. | Chile | | |
| Paloma San Basilio | Spain | | |
| Laura Branigan | United States | | |
| Luis Miguel | Mexico | | |
| Alberto Plaza | Chile | | |
| Opus | Austria | | |
| Huganzas | Chile | | |
| Miguelo | Chile | | |
| Bafona | Chile | | |
| Pepe Tapia | Chile | | |
| Pachuco y la Cubanacán | Chile | | |
| Sheila E. | United States | | |
| Medley, compuesto por Soledad Guerrero, Andrea Labarca, Rodolfo Navech, Pablo Bravo y Enrique del Valle | Chile | | |

== 1987 ==
| Artist | Country | Day | Prizes |
|---|---|---|---|
| Soda Stereo | Argentina | Day 1, Wednesday 11 February, (Apertura del Festival); Day 2, Thursday 12 February, (cierre de la Day). | |
| Luis Jara | Chile | Day 1, Wednesday 11 February | |
| Gloria del Paraguay | Paraguay | Day 1, Wednesday 11 February | |
| Eddie Money | United States | Day 1, Wednesday 11 February, (Cierre de la Day); Day 2, Thursday 12 February, (apertura de la Day). | |
| Irene Llano | Chile | Day 2, Thursday 12 February | |
| Fabio Júnior | Brazil | Day 2, Thursday 12 February | |
| Jorge Cruz | Chile | Day 2, Thursday 12 February | |
| Pandora | Mexico | Day 3, Friday 13 February, (apertura de la Day); Day 5, Sunday 21 February, (apertura de la Day). | |
| Raphael | Spain | Day 3, Friday 13 February; Day 4, Saturday 14 February, (apertura de la Day). | |
| G.I.T. | Argentina | Day 3, Friday 13 February, (Cierre de la Day); Day 6, Monday 16 February (cierre del festival) | |
| Luis Dimas | Chile | Day 4, Saturday 14 February | |
| Upa! | Chile | Day 4, Saturday 14 February | |
| Ernesto Ruiz "El Tufo" | Chile | Day 4, Saturday 14 February | |
| Manoella Torres | United States-Puerto Rico | Day 4, Saturday 14 February | |
| Pachuco y la Cubanacan | Chile | Day 4, Saturday 14 February, (Cierre de la Day) | |
| Tavares | United States | Day 5, Sunday 15 February, (apertura de la Day); Day 6, Monday 16 February. | |
| Cinema | Chile | Day 5, domingo 15 February, (apertura de la Day) | |
| Air Supply | Australia-United Kingdom | Day 5, domingo 15 February, (cierre de la Day); Day 6, Monday 16 February, (apertura de la Last Day). | |
| Bafona | Chile | | |

== 1988 ==
| Artist | Country | Day | Prizes |
|---|---|---|---|
| Vivian Reed | United States | Day 1, Wednesday 17 February, (Apertura del Festival); Day 2, Thursday 18 February. | |
| Los Enanitos Verdes | Argentina | Day 1, Wednesday 17 February; Day 2, Thursday 18 February, (cierre de la Day). | |
| Mr. Mister | United States | Day 2, Thursday 18 February, (apertura de la Day). | |
| Chayanne | Puerto Rico | Day 2, Thursday 18 February; Day 5, Sunday 21 February. | |
| El Huaso Clavel | Chile | Day 2, Thursday 18 February. | |
| Lupita Ferrer | Venezuela | Day 3, Friday 19 February, (apertura de la Day). | |
| Loredana Perasso | Italy | Day 3, Friday 19 February. | |
| Juan Antonio Labra | Chile | Day 3, Friday 19 February. | |
| Thomas Anders | Germany | Day 3, Friday 19 February, (Cierre de la Day); Day 4, Saturday 20 February, (apertura de la Day). | |
| Gloria Benavides | Chile | Day 4, Saturday 20 February. | |
| Pancho Puelma | Chile | Day 4, Saturday 20 February. | |
| Carlos Mata | Venezuela | Day 4, Saturday 20 February. | |
| Elba Ramalho | Brazil | Day 4, Saturday 20 February, (cierre de la Day). | |
| Laura Branigan | United States | Day 5, domingo 21 February, (apertura de la Day); Day 6, Monday 22 February, (cierre del Festival). | |
| Nydia Caro | Puerto Rico | Day 5, domingo 21 February. | |
| Nadie | Chile | Day 5, domingo 21 February. | |
| José Luis Rodríguez "El Puma" | Venezuela | Day 5, domingo 21 February, (cierre de la Day); Day 6, Monday 22 February. | |
| Álvaro Scaramelli | Chile | Day 6, Monday 22 February, (apertura de la Last Day). | |
| Alberto Plaza | Chile | Day 6, Monday 22 February. | |

== 1989 ==
| Artist | Country | Day | Prizes |
|---|---|---|---|
| Emmanuel | Mexico | Day 1, Friday 17 February, (apertura del Festival); Day 2, Saturday 18 February. | |
| Pablo Ruiz | Argentina | Day 1, Friday 17 February; Day 2, Saturday 18 February. | |
| Myriam Hernández | Chile | Day 1, Friday 17 February. | |
| Carlos Mata | Venezuela | Day 1, Friday 17 February. | |
| REO Speedwagon | United States | Day 1, Friday 17 February, (cierre de la Day);Day 2, Saturday 18 February, (apertura de la Day). | |
| Pachuco y la Cubanacán | Chile | Day 2, Saturday 18 February, (cierre de la Day). | |
| Thomas Anders | Germany | Day 3, Sunday 19 February, (apertura de la Day); Monday 20 February, (cierre de la Day). | |
| Rodolfo Navech | Chile | Day 3, domingo 19 February. | |
| Shirley Bassey | Wales | Day 3, domingo 19 February; Day 4, Monday 20 February, (apertura de la Day). | |
| Klaudio Showman (humor) | Chile | Day 3, domingo 19 February;Day 6, Wednesday 22 February. | |
| Carlos Mata | Venezuela | Day 3, domingo 19 February. | |
| Sonora Palacios | Chile | Day 3, domingo 19 February, (cierre de la Day). | Antorcha de Plata. |
| Andrea Labarca | Chile | Monday 20 February. | |
| Juan Antonio Labra | Chile | Monday 20 February. | |
| Roberto Carlos | Brazil | Day 5, martes 21 February, (apertura de la Day); Day 6, Wednesday 22 February, (Cierre del Festival). | |
| Hugo Varela (humor) | Argentina | Day 5, martes 21 February. | |
| Patricia Frías | Chile | Day 5, martes 21 February. | |
| Monteaguilino | Chile | Day 5, martes 21 February. | |
| Olé Olé | Spain | Day 5, martes 21 February, (cierre de la Day); Day 6, Wednesday 22 February, (apertura de la Last Day). | |
| Verónica Castro | Mexico | Day 6, Wednesday 22 February. | |
| Luis Jara | Chile | Day 6, Wednesday 22 February. | |

== 1990 ==
| Artist | Country | Day | Prizes |
|---|---|---|---|
| Juan Antonio Labra | Chile | Day 1, Wednesday 21 February, (Apertura del Festival). | |
| Manuel Mijares | Mexico | Day 1, Wednesday 21 February; Day 2, Thursday 22 February, (Cierre de la Day). | |
| Marisela | Mexico | Day 1, Wednesday 21 February; Day 6, Monday 26 February. | |
| Cheap Trick | United States | Day 1, Wednesday 21 February, (Cierre de la Day); Day 2, Thursday 22 February, (Apertura de la Day). | |
| Xuxa | Brazil | Day 2, Thursday 22 February; Day 3, Friday 23 February. | |
| Bafona | Chile | Day 2, Thursday 22 February; Day 3, Friday 23 February; Day 4, Saturday 24 February; Day 5, Sunday 25 February. | |
| Pat Henry | Chile | Day 2, Thursday 22 February. | |
| Luis Miguel | Mexico | Day 3, Friday 23 February, (Apertura de la Day); Day 4, Saturday 24 February, (Cierre de la Day). | |
| Sergio Feito (humor) | Chile | Day 3, Friday 23 February. | |
| Juan Ramón | Argentina | Day 3, Friday 23 February. | |
| Wilfrido Vargas | Dominican Republic | Day 3, Friday 23 February, (Cierre de la Day); Day 4, Saturday 24 February, (Apertura de la Day). | |
| Pujillay (humor) | Chile | Day 4, Saturday 24 February. | |
| Europe | Sweden | Day 5, domingo 25 February, (Apertura de la Day); Day 6, Monday 26 February, (Cierre del Festival). | |
| Peter Rock | Chile | Day 5, domingo 25 February. | |
| Catalina Telias | Chile | Day 5, domingo 25 February. | |
| Dyango | Spain | Day 5, domingo 25 February, (Cierre de la Day); Day 6, Monday 26 February, (Apertura de la Last Day). | |
| Alberto Plaza | Chile | Day 6, Monday 26 February. | |
| Bertín Osborne | Spain | Day 6, Monday 26 February. | |

== 1991 ==
| Artist | Country | Day | Prizes |
|---|---|---|---|
| Chayanne | Puerto Rico | Day 1, martes 5 February, (apertura del Festival); Day 4, Friday 8 February. | |
| Myriam Hernández | Chile | Day 1, martes 5 February. | |
| Congreso | Chile | Day 1, martes 5 February. | |
| Álvaro Torres | El Salvador | Day 1, martes 5 February. | |
| Angélica | Brazil | Day 1, martes 5 February; Day 6, Sunday 10 February. | |
| Faith No More | United States | Day 1, martes 5 February, (Cierre de la Day); Day 2, Wednesday 6 February, (Cierre de la Day). | |
| Francis Lalanne | France | Day 2, Wednesday 6 February, (Apertura de la Day); Day 4, Friday 8 February,(Cierre de la Day). | |
| Palta Meléndez (humor) | Chile | Day 2, Wednesday 6 February. | |
| Yuri | Mexico | Day 2, Wednesday 6 February; Day 4, Friday 8 February. | |
| Ricardo Montaner | Venezuela | Day 2, Wednesday 6 February; Day 5, Saturday 9 February. | |
| Miguel Mateos | Argentina | Day 3, Thursday 7 February, (Apertura de la Day). | |
| José Luis Rodríguez "El Puma" | Venezuela | Day 3, Thursday 7 February; Day 6, domingo 10 February, (Apertura de la Last Day). | |
| Hermógenes Conache (humor) | Chile | Day 3, Thursday 7 February. | |
| Armando Manzanero | Mexico | Day 3, Thursday 7 February. | |
| Luis Mariano | France | Day 3, Thursday 7 February, (Cierre de la Day). | |
| Los Prisioneros | Chile | Day 4, Friday 8 February, (Apertura de la Day); Day 6, domingo 10 February. | |
| Marcos "Charola" Pizarro (humor) | Chile | Day 4, Friday 8 February. | |
| Ennio Sangiusto | Italy | Day 4, Friday 8 February. | |
| Juan Luis Guerra y 4:40 | Dominican Republic | Day 5, Saturday 9 February, (Apertura de la Day); Day 6, domingo 10 February, (Cierre del Festival). | |
| Paulo Iglesias (humor) | Chile | Day 5, Saturday 9 February. | |
| Que Pasa | Venezuela | Day 5, Saturday 9 February. | |
| Eduardo Gatti | Chile | Day 5, Saturday 9 February. | |
| Osvaldo Dayz | Chile | Day 5, Saturday 9 February, (Cierre de la Day). | |
| Martika | United States-Cuba | Day 6, domingo 10 February. | |

== 1992 ==
| Artist | Country | Day | Prizes |
|---|---|---|---|
| Ballet de TVN | Chile | Day 1, Wednesday 12 February, (Apertura del Festival); Day 2, Thursday 13 February; Day 3, Friday 14 February, (Apertura de la Day); Day 4, Saturday 15 February, (Apertura de la Day); Day 6, Monday 17 February. | |
| Bafochi | Chile | Day 1, Wednesday 12 February; Day 2, Thursday 13 February; Day 4, Saturday 15 February; Day 5, Sunday 16 February, (Apertura de la Day); Day 6, Monday 17 February. | |
| Richard Marx | United States | Day 1, Wednesday 12 February; Day 2, Thursday 13 February, (Cierre de la Day). | |
| Paulo Iglesias (humor) | Chile | Day 1, Wednesday 12 February. | |
| Tito Fernández | Chile | Day 1, Wednesday 12 February. | |
| Magneto | Mexico | Day 1, Wednesday 12 February. | |
| Banda Blanca | Honduras | Day 1, Wednesday 12 February, (Cierre de la Day); Day 3, Friday 14 February. | |
| Loco Mía | Spain | Day 2, Thursday 13 February, (Apertura de la Day); Day 4, Saturday 15 February, (Cierre de la Day). | |
| The Sacados | Argentina | Day 2, Thursday 13 February. | |
| Florcita Motuda | Chile | Day 2, Thursday 13 February . | |
| Lucho Navarro (humor) | Chile | Day 2, Thursday 13 February . | |
| Enzo Corsi (humor) | Chile | Day 3, Friday 14 February. | |
| Germán Casas | Chile | Day 3, Friday 14 February. | |
| Fernando Allende | Mexico | Day 3, Friday 14 February. | |
| Ana Gabriel | Mexico | Day 3, Friday 14 February; Day 4, Saturday 15 February. | |
| Platón humor (humor) | Chile | Day 4, Saturday 15 February. | |
| Juan Antonio Labra | Chile | Day 4, Saturday 15 February. | |
| Sergio Dalma | Spain | Day 4, Saturday 15 February. | |
| Mecano | Spain | Day 5, domingo 16 February; Day 6, Monday 17 February, (Cierre del festival). | |
| Illapu | Chile | Day 5, domingo 16 February. | |
| Lucero | Mexico | Day 5, domingo 16 February. | |
| Emmanuel | Mexico | Day 5, domingo 16 February, (Cierre de la Day); Day 6, Monday 17 February, (Apertura de la Last Day). | |
| Lucho Gatica | Chile | Day 6, Monday 17 February. | |
| Sexual Democracia | Chile | Day 6, Monday 17 February. | |

== 1993 ==
| Artist | Country | Day | Prizes |
|---|---|---|---|
| Joan Manuel Serrat | Spain | Day 1, Wednesday 10 February, (apertura del Festival); Day 6, Monday 15 February, (Apertura de la Last Day). | |
| Estudiantina de la Chimba | Chile | Day 1, Wednesday 10 February | |
| Los Pitusos | Chile | Day 1, Wednesday 10 February | |
| Jon Secada | Cuba | Day 1, Wednesday 10 February; Day 3, Friday 12 February, (Cierre de la Day). | |
| Cecilia Echeñique | Chile | Day 1, Wednesday 10 February | |
| Los Ramblers | Chile | Day 1, Wednesday 10 February | |
| Luz Casal | Spain | Day 1, Wednesday 10 February | |
| Dr. Alban | Sweden | Day 1, Wednesday 10 February, (cierre de la Day). | |
| Ballet de TVN | Chile | Day 2, Thursday 11 February, (apertura de la Day); Day 3, Friday 12 February, (apertura de la Day); Day 4, Saturday 13 February, (apertura de la Day); Day 5, Sunday 14 February, (apertura de la Day) y antepenLast presentación del Day. | |
| Luis Pescetti (humor) | Argentina | Day 2, Thursday 11 February | |
| Sergio Dalma | Spain | Day 2, Thursday 11 February; Day 4, Saturday 13 February | |
| Beatlemanía | Chile | Day 2, Thursday 11 February; Day 4, Saturday 13 February | |
| Vaitiare | Tahiti-France | Day 2, Thursday 11 February | |
| Kassav' | France | Day 2, Thursday 11 February, (cierre de la Day); Day 5, domingo 14 February. | |
| Joaquín Sabina | Spain | Day 3, Friday 12 February | |
| Sandy (humor) | Bolivia | Day 3, Friday 12 February; Day 5, domingo 14 February. | |
| Garibaldi | Mexico | Day 3, Friday 12 February; Day 5, domingo 14 February. | |
| Hermanos Zabaleta | Chile | Day 3, Friday 12 February | |
| Alejandro Lerner | Argentina | Day 3, Friday 12 February | |
| Los Temerarios | Mexico | Day 4, Saturday 13 February; Day 5, domingo 14 February, (cierre de la Day). | |
| Piña colada (humor) | Chile | Day 4, Saturday 13 February | |
| Fernando Ubiergo | Chile | Day 4, Saturday 13 February | |
| El General | Panama | Day 4, Saturday 13 February | |
| Gloria Trevi | Mexico | Day 4, Saturday 13 February, (cierre de la Day). | |
| Congreso | Chile | Day 5, Sunday 14 February | |
| Ricky Martin | Puerto Rico | Day 5, domingo 14 February | |
| Mercedes Sosa | Argentina | Day 6, Monday 15 February. | |
| La Ley | Chile | Day 6, Monday 15 February. | |
| Natusha | France-Venezuela | Day 6, Monday 15 February, (cierre del Festival). | |

== 1994 ==
| Artist | Country | Day | Prizes |
|---|---|---|---|
| Ricky Martin | Puerto Rico | Day 1, Wednesday 16 February, (Apertura del Festival). | |
| Donna Summer | United States | Day 1, Wednesday 16 February. | |
| Alberto Plaza | Chile | Day 1, Wednesday 16 February. | |
| Plácido Domingo (Cantó con Lucero). | Spain | Day 1, Wednesday 16 February. | |
| Hernaldo Zúñiga | Nicaragua | Day 1, Wednesday 16 February. | |
| Palta Melendez (humor) | Chile | Day 1, Wednesday 16 February, (cierre de la Day). | |
| Christina y Los Subterráneos | Spain | Day 2, Thursday 17 February, (apertura de la Day). | |
| Onda Vaselina | Mexico | Day 2, Thursday 17 February. | |
| Claudio Baglioni | Italy | Day 2, Thursday 17 February. | |
| Julio Sabala (humor) | Dominican Republic | Day 2, Thursday 17 February; Day 4, Saturday 19 February. | |
| La Ley | Chile | Day 2, Thursday 17 February. | |
| Willie Colón | United States | Day 2, Thursday 17 February, (cierre de la Day). | |
| Illapu | Chile | Day 3, Friday 18 February, (apertura de la Day). | |
| Los Fantasmas del Caribe | Venezuela | Day 3, Friday 18 February. | |
| Los Jockers | Chile | Day 3, Friday 18 February. | |
| Paulina Rubio | Mexico | Day 3, Friday 18 February. | |
| Luis Jara | Chile | Day 3, Friday 18 February. | |
| Maná | Mexico | Day 3, Friday 18 February, (cierre de la Day). | |
| Riccardo Cocciante | Italy | Day 4, Saturday 19 February, (apertura de la Day). | |
| Pablo Herrera | Chile | Day 4, Saturday 19 February. | |
| Thalía | Mexico | Day 4, Saturday 19 February. | |
| Huey Lewis and the News | United States | Day 4, Saturday 19 February. | |
| Emmanuel | Mexico | Day 4, Saturday 19 February, (cierre de la Day). | |
| Wilfrido Vargas | Dominican Republic | Day 5, Sunday 20 February, (apertura de la Day). | |
| Alejandro Sanz | Spain | Day 5, Sunday 20 February. | |
| Jorge "Chino" Navarrete (humor) | Chile | Day 5, Sunday 20 February. | |
| Lucero | Mexico | Day 5, Sunday 20 February. | |
| Heart | United States-Canada | Day 5, Sunday 20 February, (cierre de la Day). | |
| Miguel Bosé | Spain-Italy-Panama | Day 6, Monday 21 February, (apertura de la Last Day). | |
| Myriam Hernández | Chile | Day 6, Monday 21 February. | |
| Luis Miguel | Mexico | Day 6, Monday 21 February, (cierre del festival). | |

== 1995 ==
| Artist | Country | Day | Prizes |
|---|---|---|---|
| Ricardo Arjona | Guatemala | Day 1, Wednesday 8 February, (apertura del Festival). | |
| Patricia Manterola | Mexico | Day 1, Wednesday 8 February. | |
| Keko Yunge | Chile | Day 1, Wednesday 8 February. | |
| Inner Circle | Jamaica | Day 1, Wednesday 8 February, (cierre de la Day). | |
| Marie Claire D'Ubaldo | Argentina | Day 2, Thursday 9 February, (apertura de la Day). | |
| Alejandra Guzmán | Mexico | Day 2, Thursday 9 February. | |
| Jappening con ja (humor) | Chile | Day 2, Thursday 9 February. | |
| Los Pericos | Argentina | Day 2, Thursday 9 February, (cierre de la Day). | |
| Los Iracundos | Uruguay | Day 3, Friday 10 February, (apertura de la Day). | |
| Gloria Benavides como La Cuatro Dientes (humor) | Chile | Day 3, Friday 10 February. | |
| Big Mountain | United States | Day 3, Friday 10 February. | |
| La Ley | Chile | Day 3, Friday 10 February, (cierre de la Day). | |
| Lucio Dalla | Italy | Day 4, Saturday 11 February, (apertura de la Day). | |
| Paulo Iglesias (humor) | Chile | Day 4, Saturday 11 February. | |
| King África | Argentina | Day 4, Saturday 11 February, (cierre de la Day). | |
| Jovanotti | Italy | Day 5, Sunday 12 February, (apertura de la Day). | |
| El Pampero (humor) | Chile | Day 5, Sunday 12 February. | |
| Buddy Richard | Chile | Day 5, Sunday 12 February. | |
| Aleste | Chile | Day 5, Sunday 12 February. | |
| Yuri | Mexico | Day 5, Sunday 12 February, (cierre de la Day). | |
| Ana Gabriel | Mexico | Day 6, Monday 13 February, (apertura de la Last Day). | |
| Eduardo Palomo | Mexico | Day 6, Monday 13 February. | |
| Pablo Abraira | Spain | Day 6, Monday 13 February. | |
| José Luis Rodríguez "El Puma" | Venezuela | Day 6, Monday 13 February, (cierre del Festival). | |

== 1996 ==
| Artist | Country | Day | Prizes |
|---|---|---|---|
| Carlos Vives | Colombia | Day 1, Wednesday 14 February, (Festival's first act). | |
| Dino Gordillo (comedian) | Chile | Day 1, Wednesday 14 February. | |
| Juan Gabriel | Mexico | Day 1, Wednesday 14 February, (closing act). | |
| Ricky Martin | Puerto Rico | Day 2, Thursday 15 February, (first act). | |
| Los Indolatinos (comedians) | Chile | Day 2, Thursday 15 February. | |
| Fey | Mexico | Day 2, Thursday 15 February. | |
| Los Calzones Rotos | Argentina | Day 2, Thursday 15 February, (closing act). | |
| Los Tres | Chile | Day 3, Friday 16 February, (first act). | |
| Jorge Franco El Náufrago (humor) | Chile | Day 3, Friday 16 February. | |
| Diego Torres | Argentina | Day 3, Friday 16 February, (closing act). | |
| Nicole | Chile | Day 4, Saturday 17 February, (first act). | |
| Laura Branigan | United States | Day 4, Saturday 17 February. | |
| Dinamita Show (comedians) | Chile | Day 4, Saturday 17 February; Day 6, Monday 19 February. | |
| Café Tacvba | Mexico | Day 4, Saturday 17 February, (closing act). | |
| 2 Unlimited | Netherlands | Day 5, Sunday 18 February, (first act). | |
| Paulo Iglesias (comedian) | Chile | Day 5, Sunday 18 February. | |
| Maná | Mexico | Day 5, Sunday 18 February, (closing act). | |
| Ace of Base | Sweden | Day 6, Monday 19 February, (first act). | |
| Patricia Manterola | Mexico | Day 6, Monday 19 February. | |
| Dinamita Show (comedians) | Chile | Day 4, Saturday 17 February; Day 6, Monday 19 February. | |
| Illapu | Chile | Day 6, Monday 19 February, (Festival's closing act). | |

== 1997 ==
| Artist | Country | Day | Prizes |
|---|---|---|---|
| Shakira | Colombia | Day 1, Wednesday 19 February, (Apertura del Festival). | |
| Dino Gordillo (Humor) | Chile | Day 1, Wednesday 19 February. | |
| Vanessa Mae | Singapore | Day 1, Wednesday 19 February. | |
| Miguel Bosé | Spain-Italy-Panama | Day 1, Wednesday 19 February, (Cierre de la Day). | |
| José Luis Perales | Spain | Day 2, Thursday 20 February, (Apertura de la Day). | |
| Gilberto Gless (Humor) | Mexico | Day 2, Thursday 20 February. | |
| No Mercy | United States | Day 2, Thursday 20 February. | |
| Leandro e Leonardo | Brazil | Day 2, Thursday 20 February, (Cierre de la Day). | |
| Ambra | Italy | Day 3, Friday 21 February, (Apertura de la Day). | |
| Los del Río | Spain | Day 3, Friday 21 February. | |
| Jorge Pérez (Humor) | Chile | Day 3, Friday 21 February. | |
| Flavio César | Mexico | Day 3, Friday 21 February. | |
| Los Pericos | Argentina | Day 3, Friday 21 February, (Cierre de la Day). | |
| Laura Pausini | Italy | Day 4, Saturday 22 February, (Apertura de la Day). | |
| Palta Meléndez (Humor) | Chile | Day 4, Saturday 22 February. | |
| Ana Cirré | Spain | Day 4, Saturday 22 February. | |
| Los Cantantes | Dominican Republic | Day 4, Saturday 22 February, (Cierre de la Day). | |
| Víctor Manuel y Ana Belén | Spain | Day 5, Sunday 23 February, (Apertura de la Day). | |
| Pancho del Sur (Humor) | Chile | Day 5, Sunday 23 February. | |
| Paolo Meneguzzi | Switzerland-Italy | Day 5, Sunday 23 February. | |
| La Sociedad | Chile | Day 5, Sunday 23 February, (Cierre de la Day). | |
| Gera Samba | Brazil | Day 6, Monday 24 February, (Apertura de la Last Day). | |
| Nacho Cano | Spain | Day 6, Monday 24 February. | |
| ? (Humor) | Chile | Day 6, Monday 24 February. | |
| Leonardo Favio | Argentina | Day 6, Monday 24 February. | |
| Juan Gabriel | Mexico | Day 6, Monday 24 February, (Cierre del Festival). | |

== 1998 ==
| Artist | Country | Day | Prizes |
|---|---|---|---|
| Charlie Zaa | Colombia | Day 1, Wednesday 11 February, (Apertura del Festival) | |
| Melón y Melame (Humor) | Chile | Day 1, Wednesday 11 February | |
| Juan Gabriel | Mexico | Day 1, Wednesday 11 February, (Cierre de la Day) | |
| Carlos Vives | Colombia | Day 2, Thursday 12 February, (Apertura de la Day) | |
| Óscar Gangas (Humor) | Chile | Day 2, Thursday 12 February | |
| Marta Sánchez | Spain | Day 2, Thursday 12 February | |
| Pedro Fernández | Mexico | Day 2, Thursday 12 February, (Cierre de la Day) | |
| Paolo Meneguzzi | Switzerland-Italy | Day 3, Friday 13 February, (Apertura de la Day) | |
| Sarah Sanders (Humor) | Spain | Day 3, Friday 13 February | |
| Lucybell | Chile | Day 3, Friday 13 February, (Cierre de la Day) | |
| Backstreet Boys | United States | Day 4, Saturday 14 February, (Apertura de la Day) | |
| Gloria Benavides (Humor) | Chile | Day 4, Saturday 14 February | |
| Comanche | Argentina | Day 4, Saturday 14 February, (Cierre de la Day) | |
| Eros Ramazzotti | Italy | Day 5, Sunday 15 February, (Apertura de la Day) | |
| Albert Hammond | United Kingdom-Spain | Day 5, Sunday 15 February | |
| Dino Gordillo (Humor) | Chile | Day 5, Sunday 15 February | |
| Skank | Brazil | Day 5, Sunday 15 February, (Cierre de la Day) | |
| Chayanne | Puerto Rico | Day 6, Monday 16 February, (Apertura de la Last Day) | |
| Ariztía | Chile | Day 6, Monday 16 February | |
| Los Ilegales | Dominican Republic | Day 6, Monday 16 February, (Cierre del Festival) | |

== 1999 ==
| Artist | Country | Day | Prizes |
|---|---|---|---|
| Ricardo Arjona | Guatemala | | Gaviota de Oro. |
| Carlos Ponce | Puerto Rico | | |
| Enrique Iglesias | Spain | | |
| Creedence Clearwater Revisited | United States | | |
| Charlie Zaa | Colombia | | |
| Annalisa Minetti | Italy | | |
| Emma Shapplin | France | | |
| El Símbolo | Argentina | | |
| Ricardo Montaner | Venezuela | | |
| Sandy | Bolivia | | |
| Rosana | Spain | | |
| Alberto Plaza | Chile | | |
| Glup! | Chile | | |
| Keko Yungue y Marcelo Barticciotto | Chile and Argentina | | |
| Los Indolatinos (Humor) | Chile | | |
| Melón y Melame (Humor) | Chile | | |
| Gondwana | Chile | | |
| Los Charros | Argentina | | |
| Só Pra Contrariar | Brazil | | |
| Chichí Peralta | Dominican Republic | | |
| Sandy & Papo MC | Dominican Republic | | |

== 2000 ==
| Artist | Country | Day | Prizes |
|---|---|---|---|
| Juan Luis Guerra | Dominican Republic | Day 1, Wednesday 16 February, (Apertura del Festival). | |
| Álvaro Salas (humor) | Chile | Day 1, Wednesday 16 February. | |
| A-Teens | Sweden | Day 1, Wednesday 16 February. | |
| Fulanito | United States-Dominican Republic | Day 1, Wednesday 16 February, (Cierre de la Day). | |
| Emmanuel | Mexico | Day 2, Thursday 17 February, (Apertura de la Day). | |
| Daniel Muñoz, El Malo (humor) | Chile | Day 2, Thursday 17 February. | |
| Joe Vasconcellos | Chile | Day 2, Thursday 17 February. | |
| Elvis Crespo | Puerto Rico | Day 2, Thursday 17 February, (Cierre de la Day). | |
| Chayanne | Puerto Rico | Day 3, Friday 18 February, (Apertura de la Day). | |
| Sandy | Bolivia | Day 3, Friday 18 February. | |
| Luis Jara | Chile | Day 3, Friday 18 February. | |
| Celia Cruz | Cuba | Day 3, Friday 18 February, (Cierre de la Day). | |
| Xuxa | Brazil | Day 4, Saturday 19 February, (Apertura de la Day). | |
| Douglas | Chile | Day 4, Saturday 19 February. | |
| Memo Bunke (humor) | Chile | Day 4, Saturday 19 February. | |
| Soledad Pastorutti | Argentina | Day 4, Saturday 19 February. | |
| Ráfaga | Argentina | Day 4, Saturday 19 February, (Cierre de la Day). | |
| Enrique Iglesias | Spain | Day 5, Sunday 20 February, (Apertura de la Day). | |
| Pablo Herrera | Chile | Day 5, Sunday 20 February. | |
| Coco Legrand | Chile | Day 5, Sunday 20 February. | Gaviota de Plata y Gaviota de Oro. |
| Lou Bega | Germany | Day 5, Sunday 20 February. | |
| Glup | Chile | Day 5, Sunday 20 February, (Cierre de la Day). | |
| Carlos Ponce | Puerto Rico | Day 6, Monday 21 February, (Apertura de la Last Day). | |
| Hernaldo Zúñiga | Nicaragua | Day 6, Monday 21 February. | |
| Dino Gordillo (humor) | Chile | Day 6, Monday 21 February. | |
| Pollo Fuentes | Chile | Day 6, Monday 21 February. | |
| Cristian Castro | Mexico | Day 6, Monday 21 February. | |
| Paulina Rubio | Mexico | Day 6, Monday 21 February. | |
| Duran Duran | England | Day 6, Monday 21 February, (Cierre del Festival). | |

== 2001 ==
| Artist | Country | Day | Prizes |
|---|---|---|---|
| Joaquín Cortés | Spain | Day 1, Wednesday 21 February, (Apertura del Festival). | |
| Pedro Fernández | Mexico | Day 1, Wednesday 21 February. | |
| Peabo Bryson (cantó junto a Rachel y Andrea Tessa) | United States | Day 1, Wednesday 21 February. | |
| Dinamita Show (humor) | Chile | Day 1, Wednesday 21 February. | |
| Bond | United Kingdom-Australia | Day 1, Wednesday 21 February. | |
| Vengaboys | Netherlands | Day 1, Wednesday 21 February, (Cierre de la Day). | |
| Ricardo Arjona | Guatemala | Day 2, Thursday 22 February, (Apertura de la Day). | Gaviota de Plata y Gaviota de Oro. |
| Lucero | Mexico | Day 2, Thursday 22 February. | |
| Daniel Muñoz, "El Carmelo" (humor) | Chile | Day 2, Thursday 22 February. | |
| Generación 2000, del programa Venga conmigo. (baile) | Chile | Day 2, Thursday 22 February. | |
| La Ley | Chile | Day 2, Thursday 22 February, (Cierre de la Day). | |
| Myriam Hernández | Chile | Day 3, Friday 23 February, (Apertura de la Day). | |
| Douglas | Chile | Day 3, Friday 23 February. | |
| Palmenia Pizarro | Chile | Day 3, Friday 23 February. | |
| Tito Fernández | Chile | Day 3, Friday 23 February. | |
| Artists de La Nueva Ola: Luz Eliana, Peter Rock, Los hermanos Zabaleta, Luis Dimas | Chile | Day 3, Friday 23 February. | |
| Gondwana (dúo junto a Pablo Herrera) | Chile | Day 3, Friday 23 February, (Cierre de la Day). | |
| Alejandro Fernández | Mexico | Day 4, Saturday 24 February, (Apertura de la Day). | |
| Natalia Oreiro | Uruguay | Day 4, Saturday 24 February. | |
| Memo Bunke y Natalia Cuevas (humor) | Chile | Day 4, Saturday 24 February. | |
| David Hasselhoff | United States | Day 4, Saturday 24 February. | |
| Antonio Ríos | Argentina | Day 4, Saturday 24 February, (Cierre de la Day). | |
| Ana Torroja y Miguel Bosé | Spain | Day 5, Sunday 25 February, (Apertura de la Day). | |
| Eva Ayllón | Peru | Day 5, Sunday 25 February. | |
| Lynda Thomas | Mexico | Day 5, Sunday 25 February. | |
| Millenium Show (humor) | Chile | Day 5, Sunday 25 February. | |
| La Mosca Tsé - Tsé | Argentina | Day 5, Sunday 25 February, (Cierre de la Day). | |
| Alejandro Sanz (cantó junto a Ana Torroja y Miguel Bosé) | Spain | Day 6, Monday 26 February, (Apertura de la Last Day). | |
| Edith Márquez | Mexico | Day 6, Monday 26 February. | |
| Fernando Ubiergo | Chile | Day 6, Monday 26 February. | |
| Ráfaga | Argentina | Day 6, Monday 26 February, (Cierre del Festival). | |

== 2002 ==
| Artist | Country | Day | Prizes |
|---|---|---|---|
| Cristian Castro | Mexico | Day 1, Wednesday 20 February, (Apertura del Festival). | |
| As Meninas | Brazil | Day 1, Wednesday 20 February. | |
| David y Danya (varieté) | Russia | Day 1, Wednesday 20 February. | |
| Myriam Hernández | Chile | Day 1, Wednesday 20 February; Day 6, Monday 25 February. | |
| Sergio Dalma | Spain | Day 1, Wednesday 20 February. | |
| Chocolate Latino y Nietos del Futuro | Uruguay | Day 1, Wednesday 20 February, (Cierre de la Day). | |
| Paulina Rubio | Mexico | Day 2, Thursday 21 February, (Apertura de la Day). | |
| Melody | Spain | Day 2, Thursday 21 February. | |
| Axé Bahia | Brazil | Day 2, Thursday 21 February. | |
| Ricardo Montaner | Venezuela | Day 2, Thursday 21 February. | |
| Piero | Italy-Argentina-Colombia | Day 2, Thursday 21 February. | |
| Arturo Ruiz-Tagle (humor) | Chile | Day 2, Thursday 21 February. | |
| DJ Méndez | Chile | Day 2, Thursday 21 February, (Cierre de la Day). | |
| La Ley | Chile | Day 3, Friday 22 February, (Apertura de la Day). | |
| Javiera y Los Imposibles | Chile | Day 3, Friday 22 February. | |
| Tito Fernández | Chile | Day 3, Friday 22 February. | |
| Lucho Gatica y Antonio Prieto | Chile | Day 3, Friday 22 February. | |
| Buddy Richard | Chile | Day 3, Friday 22 February. | |
| Illapu | Chile | Day 3, Friday 22 February, (Cierre de la Day). | |
| Natalia Oreiro | Uruguay | Day 4, Saturday 23 February, (Apertura de la Day). | |
| Germán Casas | Chile | Day 4, Saturday 23 February. | Gaviota de Plata. |
| Juan Gabriel | Mexico | Day 4, Saturday 23 February. | |
| Los Auténticos Decadentes | Argentina | Day 4, Saturday 23 February, (Cierre de la Day). | |
| Chayanne | Puerto Rico | Day 5, Sunday 24 February, (Apertura de la Day); Day 6, Monday 25 February, (Apertura de la Last Day). | |
| Soledad | Argentina | Day 5, Sunday 24 February. | |
| Gloria Benavides como La Cuatro Dientes (humor). | Chile | Day 5, Sunday 24 February. | |
| Patricia Manterola | Mexico | Day 5, Sunday 24 February. | |
| Los Jaivas | Chile | Day 5, Sunday 24 February, (Cierre de la Day). | |
| Cecilia Echenique | Chile | Day 6, Monday 25 February. | |
| Fito Páez | Argentina | Day 6, Monday 25 February. | |
| Víctor Heredia | Argentina | Day 6, Monday 25 February, (Cierre del Festival). | |

== 2003 ==
| Artist | Country | Day | Prizes |
|---|---|---|---|
| Maná | Mexico | Day 1, Wednesday 19 February, (Apertura del Festival). | |
| Bam Percussions (varieté) | Canada | Day 1, Wednesday 19 February. | |
| Kool & The Gang | United States | Day 1, Wednesday 19 February, (Cierre de la Day). | |
| Diego Torres | Argentina | Day 2, Thursday 20 February, (Apertura de la Day). | |
| Juanes (dúo con Javiera Parra) | Colombia | Day 2, Thursday 20 February. | |
| Porto Bahía | Brazil | Day 2, Thursday 20 February. | |
| Mauricio Flores, Melame (humor) | Chile | Day 2, Thursday 20 February. | |
| Lucybell | Chile | Day 2, Thursday 20 February, (Cierre de la Day). | Antorcha de Oro, Gaviota de Oro. |
| INXS | Australia | Day 3, Friday 21 February, (Apertura de la Day). | |
| David Bisbal | Spain | Day 3, Friday 21 February. | |
| Vanessa Miller, Bárbara, la nana Argentina (humor) | Chile-Argentina | Day 3, Friday 21 February. | |
| Rosario | Spain | Day 3, Friday 21 February. | |
| Gondwana | Chile | Day 3, Friday 21 February, (Cierre de la Day). | |
| Joe Vasconcellos | Chile-Brazil | Day 4, Saturday 22 February, (Apertura de la Day). | |
| Natalia Cuevas, Marjorie (humor) | Chile | Day 4, Saturday 22 February. | |
| Willy Sabor | Chile | Day 4, Saturday 22 February. | |
| Los Prisioneros | Chile | Day 4, Saturday 22 February, (Cierre de la Day). | Gaviota de Plata. |
| Charly García (dúo con Pedro Aznar) | Argentina | Day 5, Sunday 23 February, (Apertura de la Day). | |
| Los Nocheros | Argentina | Day 5, Sunday 23 February. | |
| Annatell | Mexico | Day 5, Sunday 23 February. | |
| Chinese State Circus (varieté) | China | Day 5, Sunday 23 February. | |
| Franco Simone (dúo con Myriam Hernández) | Italy | Day 5, Sunday 23 February. | |
| Café con Leche | Chile-Brazil | Day 5, Sunday 23 February, (Cierre de la Day). | |
| Ricardo Montaner | Venezuela | Day 6, Monday 24 February, (Apertura de la Last Day). | |
| Luis Jara | Chile | Day 6, Monday 24 February. | |
| Memo Bunke | Chile | Day 6, Monday 24 February. | |
| Sandy & Junior | Brazil | Day 6, Monday 24 February. | |
| Los Ilegales | Dominican Republic | Day 6, Monday 24 February, (Cierre del Festival). | |

== 2004 ==
| Artist | Country | Day | Prizes |
|---|---|---|---|
| Cristian Castro | Mexico | Day 1, Wednesday 18 February, (Apertura del Festival). | |
| Soraya | United States-Colombia | Day 1, Wednesday 18 February. | Antorcha de Plata. |
| Umberto Tozzi | Italy | Day 1, Wednesday 18 February. | |
| Sandy | Bolivia | Day 1, Wednesday 18 February. | Antorcha de Plata. |
| La Sonora de Tommy Rey | Chile | Day 1, Wednesday 18 February, (Cierre de la Day). | Antorcha de Plata, Antorcha de Oro y Gaviota de Plata. |
| Marciano | Chile | Day 2, Thursday 19 February, (Apertura de la Day). | |
| Camilo Sesto | Spain | Day 2, Thursday 19 February. | |
| Douglas | Chile | Day 2, Thursday 19 February. | |
| Palta Meléndez (humor) | Chile | Day 2, Thursday 19 February. | |
| Bacilos | United States-Colombia | Day 2, Thursday 19 February. | |
| Chancho en Piedra | Chile | Day 2, Thursday 19 February, (Cierre de la Day). | |
| Toto | United States | Day 3, Friday 20 February, (Apertura de la Day). | |
| Juan Gabriel | Mexico | Day 3, Friday 20 February. | |
| Álex Ubago | Spain | Day 3, Friday 20 February. | |
| Canal Magdalena | Chile | Day 3, Friday 20 February, (Cierre de la Day). | |
| María José Quintanilla | Chile | Day 4, Saturday 21 February, (Apertura de la Day). | Antorcha de Plata, Antorcha de Oro, Gaviota de Plata y Gaviota de Oro. |
| Inti-Illimani | Chile | Day 4, Saturday 21 February. | |
| Tito Fernández | Chile | Day 4, Saturday 21 February. | |
| Natalia Cuevas (humor) | Chile | Day 4, Saturday 21 February. | |
| Pettinellis | Chile | Day 4, Saturday 21 February, (Cierre de la Day). | |
| Salvatore Adamo | Italy-Belgium | Day 5, Sunday 22 February, (Apertura de la Day). | |
| Luis Fonsi | Puerto Rico | Day 5, Sunday 22 February. | |
| Fito Páez | Argentina | Day 5, Sunday 22 February. | |
| Molotov | Mexico | Day 5, Sunday 22 February, (Cierre de la Day). | |
| Ricardo Arjona | Guatemala | Day 6, Monday 23 February, (Apertura de la Last Day). | Gaviota de Plata y Gaviota de Oro. |
| Los Indolatinos (humor) | Chile | Day 6, Monday 23 February. | |
| DJ Méndez | Chile | Day 6, Monday 23 February. | |
| Jarabe de Palo | Spain | Day 6, Monday 23 February. | |
| Safri Duo | Denmark | Day 6, Monday 23 February, (Cierre del Festival). | Antorcha de Plata y Antorcha de Oro. |

== 2005 ==
| Artist | Country | Day | Prizes |
|---|---|---|---|
| Juanes | Colombia | Day 1, Wednesday 16 February, (Apertura del Festival). | |
| La Oreja de Van Gogh | Spain | Day 1, Wednesday 16 February. | |
| La Sonora Palacios | Chile | Day 1, Wednesday 16 February, (Cierre de la Day). | Antorcha de Plata. |
| Paulina Rubio | Mexico | Day 2, Thursday 17 February, (Apertura de la Day). | Antorcha de Plata |
| Hugo Varela (humor) | Argentina | Day 2, Thursday 17 February. | |
| Raphael | Spain | Day 2, Thursday 17 February. | |
| Babasónicos | Argentina | Day 2, Thursday 17 February, (Cierre de la Day). | |
| Alberto Plaza | Chile | Day 3, Friday 18 February, (Apertura de la Day). | |
| Los Hermanos Bustos | Chile | Day 3, Friday 18 February. | Antorcha de Oro |
| Felo (Humor) | Chile | Day 3, Friday 18 February. | |
| Congreso | Chile | Day 3, Friday 18 February. | |
| Lucybell | Chile | Day 3, Friday 18 February, (Cierre de la Day). | |
| La Ley | Chile | Day 4, Saturday 19 February, (Apertura de la Day). | |
| Alexandre Pires | Brazil | Day 4, Saturday 19 February. | Gaviota de Plata |
| Julieta Venegas | Mexico | Day 4, Saturday 19 February. | |
| Café Tacuba | Mexico | Day 4, Saturday 19 February, (Cierre de la Day). | |
| Miguel Bosé | Spain-Italy-Panama | Day 5, Sunday 20 February, (Apertura de la Day). | |
| Obie Bermúdez | Puerto Rico | Day 5, Sunday 20 February. | |
| David Bisbal | Spain | Day 5, Sunday 20 February. | |
| The Orchestra | United Kingdom | Day 5, Sunday 20 February, (Cierre de la Day). | |
| Marco Antonio Solís | Mexico | Day 6, Monday 21 February, (Apertura de la Last Day). | |
| Fey | Mexico | Day 6, Monday 21 February. | |
| Paulo Iglesias (humor) | Chile | Day 6, Monday 21 February. | |
| Diego Torres | Argentina | Day 6, Monday 21 February. | |
| Los Auténticos Decadentes | Argentina | Day 6, Monday 21 February, (Cierre del Festival). | |

== 2006 ==
| Artist | Country | Day | Prizes |
|---|---|---|---|
| Juan Luis Guerra | Dominican Republic | Day 1, Wednesday 22 February, (Apertura del Festival). | Antorcha de Plata y Antorcha de Oro. |
| Andy & Lucas | Spain | Day 1, Wednesday 22 February. | |
| Miranda! | Argentina | Day 1, Wednesday 22 February, (Cierre de la Day). | Antorcha de Plata, Antorcha de Oro y Gaviota de Plata. |
| José Feliciano | Puerto Rico | Day 2, Thursday 23 February, (Apertura de la Day). | Antorcha de Plata. |
| Carlos García | Argentina | Day 2, Thursday 23 February. | Antorcha de Plata. |
| Sin Bandera | Argentina-Mexico | Day 2, Thursday 23 February. | Antorcha de Plata, Antorcha de Oro y Gaviota de Plata. |
| Illapu | Chile | Day 2, Thursday 23 February, (Cierre de la Day). | Antorcha de Plata, Antorcha de Oro. |
| a-ha | Norway | Day 3, Friday 24 February, (Apertura de la Day). | Antorcha de Plata, Antorcha de Oro y Gaviota de Plata. |
| Los Tigres del Norte | Mexico | Day 3, Friday 24 February. | |
| Javier Estrada | Spain | Day 3, Friday 24 February. | |
| Julio Sabala | Dominican Republic | Day 3, Friday 24 February. | |
| Chancho en Piedra | Chile | Day 3, Friday 24 February, (Cierre de la Day). | Antorcha de Plata, Antorcha de Oro y Gaviota de Plata. |
| Kansas | United States | Day 4, Saturday 25 February, (Apertura de la Day). | Antorcha de Plata. |
| Bafona | Chile | Day 4, Saturday 25 February. | Antorcha de Plata, Antorcha de Oro y doble Gaviota de Plata. |
| Coco Legrand | Chile | Day 4, Saturday 25 February. | Antorcha de Plata, Antorcha de Oro y Gaviota de Plata. |
| Joe Vasconcellos | Chile-Brazil | Day 4, Saturday 25 February, (Cierre de la Day). | Antorcha de Plata. |
| Alejandro Fernández | Mexico | Day 5, Sunday 26 February, (Apertura de la Day). | Antorcha de Plata, Antorcha de Oro y Gaviota de Plata. |
| Martyn Chabry | Belgium | Day 5, Sunday 26 February. | |
| Alejandra Ávalos | Mexico | Day 5, Sunday 26 February. | |
| Amaral | Spain | Day 5, Sunday 26 February. | Antorcha de Plata. |
| Daddy Yankee | Puerto Rico | Day 5, Sunday 26 February, (Cierre de la Day). | Antorcha de Plata, Antorcha de Oro y Gaviota de Plata. |
| Franz Ferdinand | Scotland | Day 6, Monday 27 February, (Apertura de la Last Day). | Antorcha de Plata, Antorcha de Oro y Gaviota de Plata. |
| D'Holmikers | Switzerland | Day 6, Monday 27 February. | |
| David DeMaría | Spain | Day 6, Monday 27 February. | |
| Ruperto | Chile | Day 6, Monday 27 February. | Antorcha de Plata, Antorcha de Oro y Gaviota de Plata. |
| La Gran Sonora de Chile, Sonora de Tommy Rey y Sonora Palacios | Chile | Day 6, Monday 27 February, (Cierre del Festival). | Antorcha de Plata y Antorcha de Oro. |

== 2007 ==
| Artist | Country | Day | Prizes |
|---|---|---|---|
| Erix Logan (varieté) | Italy | Day 1, Wednesday 21 February, (Apertura del Festival). | |
| La Oreja de Van Gogh | Spain | Day 1, Wednesday 21 February, (Apertura del Festival). | Antorcha de Plata y Antorcha de Oro. |
| Mayumana | Israel | Day 1, Wednesday 21 February. | |
| Bacilos | United States- Colombia | Day 1, Wednesday 21 February, (Cierre de la Day). | Antorcha de Plata y Antorcha de Oro. |
| Tom Jones | Wales | Day 2, Thursday 22 February, (Apertura de la Day). | Antorcha de Plata, Antorcha de Oro y Gaviota de Plata. |
| Scott y Muriel (varieté) | United States- Netherlands | Day 2, Thursday 22 February. | |
| Mario Guerrero | Chile | Day 2, Thursday 22 February. | |
| Los Bunkers | Chile | Day 2, Thursday 22 February, (Cierre de la Day). | Antorcha de Plata y Antorcha de Oro. |
| Gustavo Cerati | Argentina | Day 3, Friday 23 February, (Apertura de la Day). | Antorcha de Plata, Antorcha de Oro y Gaviota de Plata. |
| Ana Torroja | Spain | Day 3, Friday 23 February. | Antorcha de Plata. |
| Kudai | Chile | Day 3, Friday 23 February, (Cierre de la Day). | Antorcha de Plata y Antorcha de Oro. |
| Bafochi | Chile | Day 4, Saturday 24 February, (Apertura de la Day); Day 5, Sunday 25 February | Antorcha de Plata (Day 4). |
| Los Tres | Chile | Day 4, Saturday 24 February. | Antorcha de Plata, Antorcha de Oro y Gaviota de Plata. |
| Álvaro Salas | Chile | Day 4, Saturday 24 February. | Antorcha de Plata y Antorcha de Oro. |
| Fito Páez | Argentina | Day 4, Saturday 24 February, (Cierre de la Day). | Antorcha de Plata, Antorcha de Oro y Gaviota de Plata. |
| Bryan Adams | Canada | Day 5, Sunday 25 February, (Apertura de la Day). | Antorcha de Plata, Antorcha de Oro y Gaviota de Plata. |
| Luis Jara | Chile | Day 5, Sunday 25 February. | Antorcha de Plata y Antorcha de Oro. |
| Palta Meléndez | Chile | Day 5, Sunday 25 February. | Antorcha de Plata. |
| Lucybell | Chile | Day 5, Sunday 25 February, (Cierre de la Day). | Antorcha de Plata, Antorcha de Oro y Gaviota de Plata. |
| Ricky Martin | Puerto Rico | Day 6, Monday 26 February, (Apertura de la Last Day). | Antorcha de Plata, Antorcha de Oro y doble Gaviota de Plata. |
| Axel | Argentina | Day 6, Monday 26 February. | |
| Don Omar | Puerto Rico | Day 6, Monday 26 February, (Cierre del Festival). | Antorcha de Plata, Antorcha de Oro y Gaviota de Plata. |

== 2008 ==
Vanilla Ninja from Estonia - won prize of best artist in 2008

| Artist | Country | Day | Prizes |
|---|---|---|---|
| Miguel Bosé | Spain-Italy-Panama | Day 1, Wednesday 20 February, (Apertura del Festival). | Antorcha de Plata y Antorcha de Oro. |
| Six Pack (Karkú) | Chile | Day 1, Wednesday 20 February. | |
| Earth, Wind & Fire | United States | Day 1, Wednesday 20 February, (Cierre de la Day). | Antorcha de Plata, Antorcha de Oro y Gaviota de Plata. |
| Journey | United States | Day 2, Thursday 21 February, (Apertura de la Day). | Antorcha de Plata, Antorcha de Oro y Gaviota de Plata. |
| Stefan Kramer (humor) | Chile | Day 2, Thursday 21 February. | Antorcha de Plata, Antorcha de Oro y Gaviota de Plata. |
| Sinergia | Chile | Day 2, Thursday 21 February, (Cierre de la Day). | Antorcha de Plata, Antorcha de Oro y Gaviota de Plata. |
| Peter Frampton | England | Day 3, Friday 22 February, (Apertura de la Day). | Antorcha de Plata, Antorcha de Oro y Gaviota de Plata. |
| Franco De Vita | Venezuela | Day 3, Friday 22 February. | Antorcha de Plata, Antorcha de Oro y doble Gaviota de Plata. |
| Cumbre tropical: Giolito y su Combo, Juana Fe y Sonora Barón. | Chile | Day 3, Friday 22 February, (Cierre de la Day). | Antorcha de Plata, Antorcha de Oro y Gaviota de Plata. |
| Bafochi | Chile | Day 4, Saturday 23 February, (Apertura de la Day); Day 5, Sunday 24 February, (Apertura de la Day). | Antorcha de Plata (Day 5). |
| Nelly Furtado | Canada | Day 4, Saturday 23 February. | Antorcha de Plata, Antorcha de Oro y Gaviota de Plata. |
| Amango | Chile | Day 4, Saturday 23 February. | Antorcha de Plata. |
| Calle 13 | Puerto Rico | Day 4, Saturday 23 February, (Cierre de la Day). | Antorcha de Plata, Antorcha de Oro y Gaviota de Plata. |
| Marco Antonio Solís | Mexico | Day 5, Sunday 24 February. | Antorcha de Plata, Antorcha de Oro y Gaviota de Plata. |
| Profesor Salomón y Tutu-Tutu | Chile | Day 5, Sunday 24 February. | |
| Coti | Argentina | Day 5, Sunday 24 February. | |
| Vicentico | Argentina | Day 5, Sunday 24 February, (Cierre de la Day). | Antorcha de Plata, Antorcha de Oro y Gaviota de Plata. |
| Chayanne | Puerto Rico | Day 6, Monday 25 February, (Apertura de la Last Day). | Antorcha de Plata, Antorcha de Oro y Gaviota de Plata. |
| Buddy Richard | Chile | Day 6, Monday 25 February. | Antorcha de Plata, Antorcha de Oro y Gaviota de Plata. |
| Wisin & Yandel | Puerto Rico | Day 6, Monday 25 February, (Cierre del Festival). | Antorcha de Plata, Antorcha de Oro y Gaviota de Plata. |

== 2009 ==
| Artist | Country | Day | Prizes |
|---|---|---|---|
| Antonio Vodanovic | Chile | Day 1, Monday 23 February, (Apertura del Festival). | Antorcha de Plata. |
| Joan Manuel Serrat | Spain | Day 1, Monday 23 February. | Antorcha de Plata. |
| Camila | Mexico | Day 1, Monday 23 February. | Antorcha de Plata, Antorcha de Oro y Gaviota de Plata. |
| La Noche | Chile | Day 1, Monday 23 February, (Cierre de la Day). | Antorcha de Plata, Antorcha de Oro y Gaviota de Plata. |
| Verónica Villarroel | Chile | Day 2, Martes 24 February, (Apertura de la Day). | Antorcha de Plata, Antorcha de Oro y Gaviota de Plata. |
| Juanes | Colombia | Day 2, Martes 24 February. | Antorcha de Plata, Antorcha de Oro y Gaviota de Plata. |
| Fernando Ubiergo | Chile | Day 2, Martes 24 February. | Antorcha de Plata, Antorcha de Oro y Gaviota de Plata. |
| KC and The Sunshine Band | United States | Day 2, Martes 24 February, (Cierre de la Day). | Antorcha de Plata, Antorcha de Oro y Gaviota de Plata. |
| Carlos Santana | Mexico | Day 3, Wednesday 25 February, (Apertura de la Day). | Antorcha de Plata, Antorcha de Oro y Gaviota de Plata. |
| Leonardo Farkas | Chile | Day 3, Wednesday 25 February. | Antorcha de Plata. |
| Dinamita Show | Chile | Day 3, Wednesday 25 February. | Antorcha de Plata, Antorcha de Oro y Gaviota de Plata. |
| Roger Hodgson | England | Day 3, Wednesday 25 February, (Cierre de la Day). | Antorcha de Plata, Antorcha de Oro y Gaviota de Plata. |
| Bafochi | Chile | Day 4, Thursday 26 February, (Apertura de la Day). | |
| Simply Red | United Kingdom | Day 4, Thursday 26 February. | Antorcha de Plata, Antorcha de Oro y Gaviota de Plata. |
| Paolo Meneguzzi | Switzerland-Italy | Day 4, Thursday 26 February. | |
| Manpoval | Chile | Day 4, Thursday 26 February. | |
| Rakim y Ken-Y | Puerto Rico | Day 4, Thursday 26 February, (Cierre de la Day). | Antorcha de Plata, Antorcha de Oro y Gaviota de Plata. |
| Luis Fonsi | Puerto Rico | Day 5, Friday 27 February, (Apertura de la Day). | Antorcha de Plata, Antorcha de Oro y Gaviota de Plata. |
| Daddy Yankee | Puerto Rico | Day 5, Friday 27 February, (Cierre de la Day). | Antorcha de Plata, Antorcha de Oro y Gaviota de Plata. |
| Natalino | Chile | Day 6, Saturday 28 February, (Apertura de la Last Day). | Antorcha de Plata y Antorcha de Oro. |
| Marc Anthony | United States- Puerto Rico | Day 6, Saturday 28 February, (Cierre del Festival). | Antorcha de Plata, Antorcha de Oro y Gaviota de Plata. |

== 2010 ==
| Artist | Country | Day | Prizes |
|---|---|---|---|
| Bafochi | Chile | Day 1, Monday 22 February, (Apertura del Festival); Day 4, Thursday 25 February, (Apertura de la Day); Day 5, Friday 26 February. | |
| Coco Legrand (humor) | Chile | Day 1, Monday 22 February. | Antorcha de Plata, doble Antorcha de Oro y Gaviota de Plata. |
| Valentín Trujillo | Chile | Day 1, Monday 22 February. | Antorcha de Plata, Antorcha de Oro y Gaviota de Plata. |
| Paul Anka | Canada | Day 1, Monday 22 February, (Cierre de la Day). | Antorcha de Plata, Antorcha de Oro y Gaviota de Plata. |
| Magic Twins | Chile | Day 2, martes 23 February, (Apertura de la Day). | Antorcha de Plata. |
| Reik | Mexico | Day 2, martes 23 February. | Antorcha de Plata y Antorcha de Oro. |
| Anahí | Mexico | Day 2, martes 23 February. | |
| Don Omar | Puerto Rico | Day 2, martes 23 February, (Cierre de la Day). | Antorcha de Plata, Antorcha de Oro y Gaviota de Plata. |
| Horacio Saavedra y su orquesta | Chile | Day 3, Wednesday 24 February, (Apertura de la Day). | |
| Bombo Fica (humor) | Chile | Day 3, Wednesday 24 February. | Antorcha de Plata, Antorcha de Oro y Gaviota de Plata. |
| Raphael | Spain | Day 3, Wednesday 24 February. | Antorcha de Plata, Antorcha de Oro y Gaviota de Plata. |
| Miranda! | Argentina | Day 3, Wednesday 24 February, (Cierre de la Day). | Antorcha de Plata y Antorcha de Oro. |
| Américo | Chile | Day 4, Thursday 25 February. | Antorcha de Plata, Antorcha de Oro y doble Gaviota de Plata. |
| Petrosyans (varieté) | Russia | Day 4, Thursday 25 February. | |
| Tito "El Bambino" | Puerto Rico | Day 4, Thursday 25 February, (Cierre de la Day). | Antorcha de Plata, Antorcha de Oro y Gaviota de Plata. |
| La Noche | Chile | Day 5, Friday 26 February, (Apertura de la Day). | Antorcha de Plata, Antorcha de Oro y Gaviota de Plata. |
| Ricardo Arjona | Guatemala | Day 5, Friday 26 February. | Antorcha de Plata, Antorcha de Oro y doble Gaviota de Plata. |
| Fanny Lu | Colombia | Day 5, Friday 26 February, (Cierre de la Day). | |

== 2011 ==
| Artist | Country | Day | Prizes |
|---|---|---|---|
| Roberto Carlos | Brazil | Day 1, Monday 21 February, (Apertura del Festival). | Antorcha de Plata, Antorcha de Oro y Gaviota de Plata. |
| Dino Gordillo | Chile | Day 1, Monday 21 February. | Antorcha de Plata y Antorcha de Oro. |
| Yuri | Mexico | Day 1, Monday 21 February, (Cierre de la Day). | Antorcha de Plata, Antorcha de Oro y Gaviota de Plata. |
| Américo | Chile | Day 2, Martes 22 February, (Apertura de la Day). | Antorcha de Plata, Antorcha de Oro y Gaviota de Plata. |
| Óscar Gangas | Chile | Day 2, martes 22 February. | Antorcha de Plata y Antorcha de Oro. |
| Aventura | Dominican Republic-United States | Day 2, martes 22 February, (Cierre de la Day). | Antorcha de Plata, Antorcha de Oro, Gaviota de Plata y Gaviota de Oro. |
| Marco Antonio Solís | Mexico | Day 3, Wednesday 23 February, (Apertura de la Day). | Antorcha de Plata, Antorcha de Oro y Gaviota de Plata. |
| Mauricio Flores | Chile | Day 3, Wednesday 23 February. | Antorcha de Plata y Antorcha de Oro. |
| Calle 13 | Puerto Rico | Day 3, Wednesday 23 February, (Cierre de la Day). | Antorcha de Plata. |
| Chayanne | Puerto Rico | Day 4, Thursday 24 February, (Apertura de la Day). | Antorcha de Plata, Antorcha de Oro, Gaviota de Plata y Gaviota de Oro. |
| Carlos Baute | Venezuela | Day 4, Thursday 24 February. | Antorcha de Plata. |
| Pitbull | Cuba-United States | Day 4, Thursday 24 February, (Cierre de la Day). | Antorcha de Plata. |
| Sting | United Kingdom-England | Day 5, Friday 25 February, (Apertura de la Day). | Antorcha de Plata, Antorcha de Oro, Gaviota de Plata y Gaviota de Oro. |
| Ricardo Meruane | Chile | Day 5, Friday 25 February. | |
| Los Jaivas | Chile | Day 5, Friday 25 February, (Cierre de la Day). | Antorcha de Plata, Antorcha de Oro, Gaviota de Plata y Gaviota de Oro. |
| Alejandro Sanz | Spain | Day 6, Saturday 26 February, (Apertura de la Last Day). | Antorcha de Plata, Antorcha de Oro, Gaviota de Plata y Gaviota de Oro. |
| Noel Schajris | Argentina-Mexico | Day 6, Saturday 26 February. | Antorcha de Plata y Antorcha de Oro. |
| Cumbre bailable de grupos de cumbia: Villa Cariño y Viking 5 | Chile | Day 6, Saturday 26 February, (Festival Ending). | Antorcha de Plata y Antorcha de Oro. |

== 2012 ==
| Artist | Country | Day | Prizes |
|---|---|---|---|
| Diego Torres | Argentina | Day 1, Wednesday 22 February (Apertura del Festival) | Antorcha de Plata y Antorcha de Oro |
| Luis Miguel | Mexico | Day 1, Wednesday 22 February (Cierre de la Day) | Antorcha de Plata, Antorcha de Oro y Gaviota de Platino |
| Camila | Mexico | Day 2, Thursday 23 February (Apertura de la Day) | Antorcha de Plata, Antorcha de Oro y Gaviota de Plata |
| Dinamita Show | Chile | Day 2, Thursday 23 February | Antorcha de Plata, Antorcha de Oro, Gaviota de Plata y Gaviota de Oro |
| Marc Anthony | United States-Puerto Rico | Day 2, Thursday 23 February (Cierre de la Day) | Antorcha de Plata, Antorcha de Oro, Gaviota de Plata y Gaviota de Oro |
| Daniel Muñoz | Chile | Day 3, Friday 24 February (Apertura de la Day) | Antorcha de Plata |
| Salvatore Adamo | Italy-Belgium | Day 3, Friday 24 February | Antorcha de Plata, Antorcha de Oro y Gaviota de Plata |
| Morrissey | United Kingdom | Day 3, Friday 24 February (Cierre de la Day) | |
| Los Bunkers | Chile | Day 4, Saturday 25 February (Apertura de la Day) | Antorcha de Plata, Antorcha de Oro, Gaviota de Plata y Gaviota de Oro |
| Zip-Zup | Chile | Day 4, Saturday 25 February | Antorcha de Plata y Antorcha de Oro |
| Manuel García | Chile | Day 4, Saturday 25 February | Antorcha de Plata, Antorcha de Oro, Gaviota de Plata y Gaviota de Oro |
| Garras de Amor | Argentina | Day 4, Saturday 25 February | |
| Ráfaga | Argentina | Day 4, Saturday 25 February (Cierre de la Day) | |
| Luis Fonsi | Puerto Rico | Day 5, Sunday 26 February (Apertura de la Day) | Antorcha de Plata, Antorcha de Oro, Gaviota de Plata y Gaviota de Oro |
| Rosana | Spain | Day 5, Sunday 26 February | Antorcha de Plata y Antorcha de Oro |
| Prince Royce | United States-Dominican Republic | Day 5, Sunday 26 February (Cierre de la Day) | Antorcha de Plata, Antorcha de Oro y Gaviota de Plata |
| Bombo Fica | Chile | Day 6, Monday 27 February (Apertura de la Last Day) | Antorcha de Plata, Antorcha de Oro, Gaviota de Plata y Gaviota de Oro |
| Juan Luis Guerra | Dominican Republic | Day 6, Monday 27 February | |
| José Luis Perales | Spain | Day 6, Monday 27 February (Cierre del Festival) | |

== 2013 ==
| Artist | Country | Day | Prizes |
|---|---|---|---|
| Maná | Mexico | Day 1, Sunday 24 February (Apertura del Festival) | Antorcha de Plata, Antorcha de Oro, Gaviota de Plata y Gaviota de Oro |
| Hermógenes Conache (humor) | Chile | Day 1, Sunday 24 February | Antorcha de Plata y Antorcha de Oro |
| Chino & Nacho | Venezuela | Day 1, Sunday 24 February (Cierre de la Day) | Antorcha de Plata y Antorcha de Oro |
| Romeo Santos | Dominican Republic-United States | Day 2, Monday 25 February (Apertura de la Day) | Antorcha de Plata, Antorcha de Oro, Gaviota de Plata y Gaviota de Oro |
| Los Atletas de la Risa | Chile | Day 2, Monday 25 February | Antorcha de Plata, Antorcha de Oro, Gaviota de Plata y Gaviota de Oro |
| Daddy Yankee | Puerto Rico | Day 2, Monday 25 February (Cierre de la Day) | Antorcha de Plata, Antorcha de Oro, Gaviota de Plata y Gaviota de Oro |
| Miguel Bosé | Spain-Italy-Panama | Day 3, martes 26 February (Apertura de la Day) | Antorcha de Plata, Antorcha de Oro, Gaviota de plata y Gaviota de oro |
| Nancho Parra (humor) | Chile | Day 3, martes 26 February | Antorcha de Plata, Antorcha de Oro, Gaviota de Plata y Gaviota de Oro |
| Jonas Brothers | United States | Day 3, martes 26 February (Cierre de la Day) | Antorcha de Plata, Antorcha de Oro, Gaviota de Plata y Gaviota de Oro |
| 31 minutos | Chile | Day 4, Wednesday 27 February (Apertura de la Day) | Antorcha de Plata, Antorcha de Oro, Gaviota de Plata y Gaviota de Oro |
| Bastián Paz (humor) | Chile | Day 4, Wednesday 27 February | Antorcha de Plata, Antorcha de Oro y Gaviota de Plata |
| Francisca Valenzuela | Chile | Day 4, Wednesday 27 February | Antorcha de Plata, Antorcha de Oro, Gaviota de Plata y Gaviota de Oro |
| Jorge González | Chile | Day 4, Wednesday 27 February (Cierre de la Day) | Antorcha de Plata, Antorcha de Oro, Gaviota de Plata y Gaviota de Oro |
| Elton John | United Kingdom | Day 5, Thursday 28 February (Apertura de la Day) | Antorcha de Plata, Antorcha de Oro, Gaviota de Plata y Gaviota de Oro |
| Memo Bunke (humor) | Chile | Day 5, Thursday 28 February | Antorcha de Plata, Antorcha de Oro y Gaviota de Plata |
| Albert Hammond | United Kingdom-Gibraltar | Day 5, Thursday 28 February | Antorcha de Plata, Antorcha de Oro y Gaviota de Plata |
| La Sonora de Tommy Rey | Chile | Day 5, Thursday 28 February (Cierre de la Day) | Antorcha de Plata, Antorcha de Oro, Gaviota de Plata y Gaviota de Oro |
| Wisin & Yandel | Puerto Rico | Day 6, Friday 1 de marzo (Apertura de la Last Day) | Antorcha de Plata, Antorcha de Oro, Gaviota de Plata y Gaviota de Oro. |
| Gloria Trevi | Mexico | Day 6, Friday 1 de marzo | Antorcha de Plata, Antorcha de Oro, Gaviota de Plata y Gaviota de Oro |
| Pablo Alborán | Spain | Day 6, Friday 1 de marzo | Antorcha de Plata, Antorcha de Oro, Gaviota de Plata y Gaviota de Oro |
| Los Auténticos Decadentes | Argentina | Day 6, Friday 1 de marzo (Cierre del Festival) | Antorcha de Plata, Antorcha de Oro, Gaviota de Plata y Gaviota de Oro |

== 2014 ==
| Artist | Country | Day | Prizes |
|---|---|---|---|
| Ricky Martin | Puerto Rico | Day 1, Sunday 23 February (Apertura del Festival) | Antorcha de Plata, Antorcha de Oro, Gaviota de Plata y Gaviota de Oro. |
| Los Locos del Humor | Chile | Day 1, Sunday 23 February | Antorcha de Plata, Antorcha de Oro y Gaviota de Plata. |
| Los Tres | Chile | Day 1, Sunday 23 February (Cierre de la Day) | Antorcha de Plata, Antorcha de Oro, Gaviota de Plata y Gaviota de Oro. |
| Laura Pausini | Italy | Day 2, Monday 24 February (Apertura de la Day) | Antorcha de Plata, Antorcha de Oro, Gaviota de Plata y Gaviota de Oro. |
| Jorge Alís | Argentina | Day 2, Monday 24 February | Antorcha de Plata, Antorcha de Oro, Gaviota de Plata y Gaviota de Oro. |
| Fito Páez | Argentina | Day 2, Monday 24 February (Cierre de la Day) | Antorcha de Plata, Antorcha de Oro, Gaviota de Plata y Gaviota de Oro. |
| Ana Gabriel | Mexico | Day 3, martes 25 February (Apertura de la Day) | Antorcha de Plata, Antorcha de Oro, Gaviota de Plata y Gaviota de Oro, Copihue de Oro por ser "la Artist más popular" del festival en su 55.ª versión |
| Ruddy Rey | Chile | Day 3, martes 25 February | |
| Raphael | Spain | Day 3, martes 25 February (Cierre de la Day) | Antorcha de Plata, Antorcha de Oro, Gaviota de Plata y Gaviota de Oro. |
| La Ley (con la participación especial de Zeta Bosio) | Chile-Argentina | Day 4, Wednesday 26 February (Apertura de la Day) | Antorcha de Plata, Antorcha de Oro, Gaviota de Plata y Gaviota de Oro. |
| Carlos Vives | Colombia | Day 4, Wednesday 26 February | Antorcha de Plata, Antorcha de Oro, Gaviota de Plata y Gaviota de Oro. |
| Gepe | Chile | Day 4, Wednesday 26 February | Antorcha de Plata, Antorcha de Oro, Gaviota de Plata y Gaviota de Oro. |
| Yandar & Yostin | Colombia | Day 4, Wednesday 26 February (Cierre de la Day) | Antorcha de Plata y Antorcha de Oro. |
| Rod Stewart | United Kingdom | Day 5, Thursday 27 February (Apertura de la Day) | Antorcha de Plata, Antorcha de Oro, Gaviota de Plata y Gaviota de Oro. |
| Gigi Martin | Chile | Day 5, Thursday 27 February | Antorcha de Plata, Antorcha de Oro, Gaviota de Plata y Gaviota de Oro. |
| Paloma San Basilio | Spain | Day 5, Thursday 27 February | Antorcha de Plata, Antorcha de Oro, Gaviota de Plata y Gaviota de Oro. |
| La Sonora Palacios | Chile | Day 5, Thursday 27 February (Cierre de la Day) | Antorcha de Plata, Antorcha de Oro, Gaviota de Plata y Gaviota de Oro. |
| Jesse & Joy | Mexico | Day 6, Friday 28 February (Apertura de la Last Day) | Antorcha de Plata, Antorcha de Oro, Gaviota de Plata y Gaviota de Oro. |
| Payahop | Chile | Day 6, Friday 28 February | Antorcha de Plata, Antorcha de Oro, Gaviota de Plata y Gaviota de Oro. |
| Melendi | Spain | Day 6, Friday 28 February | Antorcha de Plata, Antorcha de Oro, Gaviota de Plata y Gaviota de Oro. |
| Tommy Torres | Puerto Rico | Day 6, Friday 28 February | Antorcha de Plata, Antorcha de Oro, Gaviota de Plata y Gaviota de Oro. |
| Alexis & Fido | Puerto Rico | Day 6, Friday 28 February (Cierre del Festival) | Antorcha de Plata, Antorcha de Oro, Gaviota de Plata y Gaviota de Oro. |

== 2015 ==
| Artist | Country | Day | Prizes |
|---|---|---|---|
| Luis Fonsi | United States Puerto Rico | Day 1 (Open the festival) | Gaviota de Plata and Gaviota de Oro. |
| Dinamita Show | Chile | Day 1 | Gaviota de Plata and Gaviota de oro. |
| Yandel (participacion especial de Tony Dize) | Puerto Rico | Day 1 (Close the night) | Gaviota de Plata and Gaviota de Oro. |
| Ricardo Arjona (participacion especial de Gaby Moreno) | Guatemala | Day 2 (Open the night) | Gaviota de Plata and Gaviota de Oro. |
| Centella | Chile | Day 2 | Gaviota de Plata and Gaviota de Oro. |
| Reik | Mexico | Day 2 (Close the night) | Gaviota de Plata and Gaviota de Oro. |
| Alejandro Fernandez | Mexico | Day 3 (open the night) | Gaviota de Plata and Gaviota de Oro. |
| El huaso filomeno | Chile | Day 3 | Gaviota de Plata and Gaviota de Oro. |
| Nicole | Chile | Day 3 | Gaviota de Plata and Gaviota de Oro. |
| Emmanuel (participacion especial de Alexander Acha hijo de Emmanuel) | Mexico | Day 3 (Close the night) | Gaviota de Plata and Gaviota de Oro. |
| Vicentico | Argentina | Day 4 | |
| Leon Murillo | Chile | Day 4 | |
| Pedro Aznar | Argentina | Day 4 | |
| Cultura Profética | Puerto Rico | Day 4 | |
| Romeo Santos | United States/Dominican Republic | Day 5 | |
| Noche de brujas | Chile | Day 5 | |
| Cat Stevens | United Kingdom | Day 6 | |
| Arturo Ruiz-Tagle | Chile | Day 6 | |
| Nano Stern | Chile | Day 6 | |
| Oscar D'León | Venezuela | Day 6 | |

== 2016 ==
| Artist | Country | Day | Prizes |
|---|---|---|---|
| Marco Antonio Solís | Mexico | Monday, February 22 | Gaviota de Plata and Gaviota de Oro |
| Edo Caroe | Chile | Monday, February 22 | Gaviota de Plata and Gaviota de Oro |
| Ricardo Montaner | Venezuela | Monday, February 22 | Gaviota de Plata and Gaviota de Oro |
| Eros Ramazzotti | Italy | Tuesday, February 23 | Gaviota de Plata and Gaviota de Oro |
| Rodrigo González | Chile | Tuesday, February 23 | Gaviota de Plata and Gaviota de Oro |
| Ana Torroja | Spain | Tuesday, February 23 | Gaviota de Plata and Gaviota de Oro |
| Alejandro Sanz | Spain | Wednesday, February 24 | Gaviota de Plata and Gaviota de Oro |
| Natalia Valdebenito | Chile | Wednesday, February 24 | Gaviota de Plata and Gaviota de Oro |
| Luis Jara | Chile | Wednesday, February 24 | Gaviota de Plata and Gaviota de Oro |
| Lionel Richie | United States | Thursday, February 25 | Gaviota de Plata and Gaviota de Oro |
| Pedro Ruminot | Chile | Thursday, February 25 | Gaviota de Plata |
| Rick Astley | United Kingdom | Thursday, February 25 | Gaviota de Plata and Gaviota de Oro |
| Pablo Alborán | Spain | Friday, February 26 | Gaviota de Plata and Gaviota de Oro |
| Los Locos del Humor | Chile | Friday, February 26 | Gaviota de Plata and Gaviota de Oro |
| Nicky Jam | United States Puerto Rico | Friday, February 26 | Gaviota de Plata and Gaviota de Oro |
| Wisin | Puerto Rico | Saturday, February 27 | Gaviota de Plata and Gaviota de Oro |
| Ricardo Meruane | Chile | Saturday, February 27 | |
| Javiera Mena | Chile | Saturday, February 27 | Gaviota de Plata and Gaviota de Oro |
| Don Omar | Puerto Rico | Saturday, February 27 | Gaviota de Plata and Gaviota de Oro |

== 2017 ==
| Artist | Country | Day | Prizes |
|---|---|---|---|
| Los Fabulosos Cadillac | Argentina | Monday, February 20 | Gaviota de Plata and Gaviota de Oro |
| Juan Pablo López | Chile | Monday, February 20 | Gaviota de Plata and Gaviota de Oro |
| Los Auténticos Decadentes | Argentina | Monday, February 20 | Gaviota de Plata and Gaviota de Oro |
| Sin Bandera | Mexico | Tuesday, February 21 | Gaviota de Plata and Gaviota de Oro |
| Daniela Aguayo | Chile | Tuesday, February 21 | Gaviota de Plata and Gaviota de Oro |
| Camila | Mexico | Tuesday, February 21 | Gaviota de Plata and Gaviota de Oro |
| Isabel Pantoja | Spain | Wednesday, February 22 | Gaviota de Plata, Gaviota de Oro and Gaviota de Platino |
| Carlos Sánchez | Colombia | Wednesday, February 22 | Gaviota de Plata and Gaviota de Oro |
| Río Roma | Mexico | Wednesday, February 22 | Gaviota de Plata and Gaviota de Oro |
| Olivia Newton-John | United Kingdom Australia | Thursday, February 23 | Gaviota de Plata and Gaviota de Oro |
| Juan Luis Calderón | Chile | Thursday, February 23 | Gaviota de Plata and Gaviota de Oro |
| Peter Cetera | United States | Thursday, February 23 | Gaviota de Plata and Gaviota de Oro |
| Maluma | Colombia | Friday, February 24 | Gaviota de Plata and Gaviota de Oro |
| Rodrigo Villegas | Chile | Friday, February 24 | Gaviota de Plata and Gaviota de Oro |
| Américo | Chile | Friday, February 24 | Gaviota de Plata and Gaviota de Oro |
| J Balvin | Colombia | Saturday, February 25 | Gaviota de Plata and Gaviota de Oro |
| Fabrizio Copano | Chile | Saturday, February 25 | Gaviota de Plata and Gaviota de Oro |
| Lali Espósito | Argentina | Saturday, February 25 | Gaviota de Plata, Gaviota de Oro, and Artista del Festival |
| Mon Laferte | Chile | Saturday, February 25 | Gaviota de Plata, Gaviota de Oro and Reina del Mounstro |
| Márama and Rombai | Uruguay | Saturday, February 25 | Gaviota de Plata and Gaviota de Oro |

== 2018 ==
| Artist | Country | Day | Prizes |
|---|---|---|---|
| Miguel Bosé | Spain | Tuesday, February 20 | Gaviota de Plata, Gaviota de Oro and Artista Icono |
| Bombo Fica | Chile | Tuesday, February 20 | Gaviota de Plata and Gaviota de Oro |
| Illapu | Chile | Tuesday, February 20 | Gaviota de Plata and Gaviota de Oro |
| Luis Fonsi | Puerto Rico | Wednesday, February 21 | Gaviota de Plata and Gaviota de Oro |
| Jenny Cavallo | Chile | Wednesday, February 21 | Gaviota de Plata and Gaviota de Oro |
| Gente de Zona | Cuba | Wednesday, February 21 | Gaviota de Plata and Gaviota de Oro |
| Jamiroquai | United Kingdom | Thursday, February 22 | Gaviota de Plata and Gaviota de Oro |
| Stefan Kramer | Chile | Thursday, February 22 | Gaviota de Plata and Gaviota de Oro |
| Europe | Sweden | Thursday, February 22 | Gaviota de Plata and Gaviota de Oro |
| Jesse & Joy | Mexico | Friday, February 23 | Gaviota de Plata and Gaviota de Oro |
| Alison Mandel | Chile | Friday, February 23 | Gaviota de Plata and Gaviota de Oro |
| Prince Royce | United States | Friday, February 23 | Gaviota de Plata and Gaviota de Oro |
| Carlos Vives | Colombia | Saturday, February 24 | Gaviota de Plata and Gaviota de Oro |
| Alejandra Azcárate | Colombia | Saturday, February 24 | Gaviota de Plata and Gaviota de Oro |
| Ha*Ash | United States | Saturday, February 24 | Gaviota de Plata, Gaviota de Oro and Reina del Mounstro (Ashley) |
| CNCO | CubaEcuador Dominican Republic Puerto Rico Mexico | Sunday, February 25 | Gaviota de Plata, Gaviota de Oro, and Artista del Festival |
| Sergio Freire | Chile | Sunday, February 25 | Gaviota de Plata and Gaviota de Oro |
| Augusto Schuster | Chile | Sunday, February 25 | Gaviota de Plata and Gaviota de Oro |
| Zion & Lennox | Puerto Rico | Sunday, February 25 | Gaviota de Plata and Gaviota de Oro |

== 2019 ==
| Artist | Country | Day | Prizes |
|---|---|---|---|
| Wisin & Yandel | Puerto Rico | Sunday, February 24 | Gaviota de Plata and Gaviota de Oro. |
| Felipe Avello | Chile | Sunday, February 24 | Gaviota de Plata and Gaviota de Oro. |
| Sebastián Yatra | Colombia | Sunday, February 24 | Gaviota de Plata and Gaviota de Oro. |
| Raphael | Spain | Monday, February 25 | Gaviota de Plata and Gaviota de Oro. |
| Dino Gordillo | Chile | Monday, February 25 | Gaviota de Plata and Gaviota de Oro. |
| Yuri | Mexico | Monday, February 25 | Gaviota de Plata and Gaviota de Oro. |
| Marc Anthony | Puerto RicoUnited States | Tuesday, February 26 | Gaviota de Plata and Gaviota de Oro. |
| Jani Dueñas | Chile | Tuesday, February 26 | |
| David Bisbal | Spain | Tuesday, February 26 | Gaviota de Plata and Gaviota de Oro. |
| MIRUD | Albania | Tuesday, February 26 | Gaviota de Plata. |
| Marco Antonio Solís | Mexico | Wednesday, February 27 | Gaviota de Plata and Gaviota de Oro. The Keys of the City. |
| Jorge Alís | ArgentinaChile | Wednesday, February 27 | Gaviota de Plata and Gaviota de Oro. |
| Carlos Rivera | Mexico | Wednesday, February 27 | Gaviota de Plata and Gaviota de Oro. |
| Backstreet Boys | United States | Thursday, February 28 | Gaviota de Plata and Gaviota de Oro. |
| Mauricio Palma | Chile | Thursday, February 28 | Gaviota de Plata and Gaviota de Oro. |
| CAMI | Chile | Thursday, February 28 | Gaviota de Plata and Gaviota de Oro. |
| Bad Bunny | Puerto Rico | Friday, March 1 | Gaviota de Plata and Gaviota de Oro. |
| Bonco Quiñongo | Cuba | Friday, March 1 | Gaviota de Plata and Gaviota de Oro. |
| Becky G | United States | Friday, March 1 | Gaviota de Plata and Gaviota de Oro. |

== 2020 ==
| Artist | Country | Day | Prizes |
|---|---|---|---|
| Ricky Martin | Puerto Rico | Sunday, February 23 | Gaviota de Plata and Gaviota de Oro. |
| Stefan Kramer | Chile | Sunday, February 23 | Gaviota de Plata and Gaviota de Oro. |
| Pedro Capó | Puerto Rico | Sunday, February 23 | Gaviota de Plata and Gaviota de Oro. |
| Mon Laferte | Chile | Monday, February 24 | Gaviota de Plata and Gaviota de Oro. |
| Javiera Contador | Chile | Monday, February 24 | Gaviota de Plata and Gaviota de Oro. |
| Francisca Valenzuela | Chile | Monday, February 24 | Gaviota de Plata and Gaviota de Oro. |
| Ana Gabriel | Mexico | Tuesday, February 25 | Gaviota de Plata and Gaviota de Oro. |
| Ernesto Belloni | Chile | Tuesday, February 25 | Gaviota de Plata and Gaviota de Oro. |
| Pimpinela | Argentina | Tuesday, February 25 | Gaviota de Plata and Gaviota de Oro. |
| Pablo Alborán | Spain | Wednesday, February 26 | Gaviota de Plata and Gaviota de Oro. |
| Fusión Humor | Chile | Wednesday, February 26 | Gaviota de Plata and Gaviota de Oro. |
| Luciano Pereyra | Argentina | Wednesday, February 26 | Gaviota de Plata and Gaviota de Oro. |
| Maroon 5 | United States | Thursday, February 27 | |
| Paul Vásquez "El Flaco" | Chile | Thursday, February 27 | Gaviota de Plata and Gaviota de Oro. |
| Alexandre Pires | Brazil | Thursday, February 27 | Gaviota de Plata and Gaviota de Oro. |
| Ozuna | Puerto Rico | Friday, February 28 | Gaviota de Plata and Gaviota de Oro. |
| Pedro Ruminot | Chile | Friday, February 28 | Gaviota de Plata and Gaviota de Oro. |
| Denise Rosenthal | Chile | Friday, February 28 | Gaviota de Plata and Gaviota de Oro. |
| Noche De Brujas | Chile | Friday, February 28 | Gaviota de Plata and Gaviota de Oro. |

== 2023 ==
| Artist | Country | Day | Prizes |
|---|---|---|---|
| Karol G | Colombia | Sunday, February 19 | Gaviota de Plata and Gaviota de Oro. |
| Pamela Leiva | Chile | Sunday, February 19 | Gaviota de Plata and Gaviota de Oro. |
| Paloma Mami | Chile, United States | Sunday, February 19 | Gaviota de Plata and Gaviota de Oro. |
| Tini | Argentina | Monday, February 20 | Gaviota de Plata and Gaviota de Oro. |
| Diego Urrutia | Chile | Monday, February 20 | Gaviota de Plata and Gaviota de Oro. |
| Emilia | Argentina | Monday, February 20 | Gaviota de Plata and Gaviota de Oro. |
| Alejandro Fernandez | Mexico | Tuesday, February 21 | Gaviota de Plata and Gaviota de Oro. |
| Belén Mora | Chile | Tuesday, February 21 | Gaviota de Plata. |
| Los Jaivas | Chile | Tuesday, February 21 | Gaviota de Plata and Gaviota de Oro. The Keys of the City. |
| Fito Páez | Argentina | Wednesday, February 22 | Gaviota de Plata and Gaviota de Oro. |
| Rodrigo Villegas | Chile | Wednesday, February 22 | Gaviota de Plata and Gaviota de Oro. |
| Rels B | Spain | Wednesday, February 22 | Gaviota de Plata and Gaviota de Oro. |
| Christina Aguilera | United States | Thursday, February 23 | Gaviota de Plata and Gaviota de Oro. |
| Fabrizio Copano | Chile | Thursday, February 23 | Gaviota de Plata and Gaviota de Oro. |
| Polimá Westcoast | Chile | Thursday, February 23 | Gaviota de Plata and Gaviota de Oro. |
| Laila Roth | Chile | Friday, February 24 | Gaviota de Plata. |
| Camilo | Colombia | Friday, February 24 | Gaviota de Plata and Gaviota de Oro. |
| Nicki Nicole | Argentina | Friday, February 24 | Gaviota de Plata and Gaviota de Oro. |

== 2024 ==
| Artist | Country | Day | Prizes |
|---|---|---|---|
| Alejandro Sanz | Spain | Sunday, February 25 | Gaviota de Plata and Gaviota de Oro. |
| Alison Mandel | Chile | Sunday, February 25 | Gaviota de Plata and Gaviota de Oro. |
| Manuel Turizo | Colombia | Sunday, February 25 | Gaviota de Plata and Gaviota de Oro. |
| Andrea Bocelli | Italy | Monday, February 26 | Gaviota de Plata and Gaviota de Oro. |
| Javiera Contador | Chile | Monday, February 26 | |
| Miranda! | Argentina | Monday, February 26 | Gaviota de Plata and Gaviota de Oro. |
| Maná | Mexico | Tuesday, February 27 | Gaviota de Plata and Gaviota de Oro. |
| Luis Slimming | Chile | Tuesday, February 27 | Gaviota de Plata and Gaviota de Oro. |
| Men at Work | Australia | Tuesday, February 27 | Gaviota de Plata and Gaviota de Oro. |
| Mora | Puerto Rico | Wednesday, February 28 | Gaviota de Plata and Gaviota de Oro. |
| Lucho Miranda | Chile | Wednesday, February 28 | Gaviota de Plata and Gaviota de Oro. |
| Anitta | Brazil | Wednesday, February 28 | Gaviota de Plata and Artista Más Popular de Viña. (Note: "El Monstruo" cheered for the singer so that she could receive the Gaviota de Oro, but the singer, due to an error in the organization of the event, left the stage before it was possible to receive it from the audience.) |
| Los Bunkers | Chile | Thursday, February 29 | Gaviota de Plata and Gaviotas de Oro. |
| Sergio Freire | Chile | Thursday, February 29 | Gaviota de Plata and Gaviota de Oro. |
| Young Cister | Chile | Thursday, February 29 | Gaviota de Plata and Gaviota de Oro. |
| Trueno | Argentina | Friday, March 1 | Gaviota de Plata and Gaviota de Oro. |
| Alex Ortiz | Chile | Friday, March 1 | Gaviota de Plata and Gaviota de Oro. |
| María Becerra | Argentina | Friday, March 1 | Gaviota de Plata and Gaviota de Oro. |

== 2025 ==
| Artist | Country | Day | Prizes |
|---|---|---|---|
| Marc Anthony | Puerto Rico, United States | Sunday, February 23 | Gaviota de Plata and Gaviota de Oro. |
| George Harris | Venezuela | Sunday, February 23 | |
| Bacilos | Brazil, Colombia, United States | Sunday, February 23 | Gaviota de Plata and Gaviota de Oro. |
| Myriam Hernández | Chile | Monday, February 24 | Gaviota de Plata, Gaviota de Oro and Gaviota de Platino. |
| Chiqui Aguayo | Chile | Monday, February 24 | Gaviota de Plata and Gaviota de Oro. |
| Ha*Ash | Mexico, United States | Monday, February 24 | Gaviota de Plata and Gaviota de Oro. |
| Carlos Vives | Colombia | Wednesday, February 26 | Gaviota de Plata and Gaviota de Oro. |
| Edo Caroe | Chile | Wednesday, February 26 | Gaviota de Plata and Gaviota de Oro. |
| Carín León | Mexico | Wednesday, February 26 | Gaviota de Plata and Gaviota de Oro. |
| Incubus | United States | Thursday, February 27 | Gaviota de Plata and Gaviota de Oro. |
| Juan Pablo López | Chile | Thursday, February 27 | Gaviota de Plata and Gaviota de Oro. |
| The Cult | United Kingdom | Thursday, February 27 | Gaviota de Plata |
| Duki | Argentina | Friday, February 28 | Gaviota de Plata and Gaviota de Oro. |
| Pam Pam | Chile | Friday, February 28 | Gaviota de Plata. |
| Eladio Carrión | Puerto Rico, United States | Friday, February 28 | Gaviota de Plata and Gaviota de Oro. |
| Kidd Voodoo | Chile | Friday, February 28 | Gaviota de Plata and Gaviota de Oro. |
| Morat | Colombia | Saturday, March 1 (Note: Initially, this day was to be held on February 25, but due to the national blackout, it was suspended and rescheduled for March 1.) | Gaviota de Plata and Gaviota de Oro. |
| Pedro Ruminot | Chile | Saturday, March 1 | Gaviota de Plata and Gaviota de Oro. |
| Sebastián Yatra | Colombia | Saturday, March 1 | Gaviota de Plata and Gaviota de Oro. |

== 2026 ==
| Artist | Country | Day | Prizes |
|---|---|---|---|
| Gloria Estefan | Cuba | Sunday, February 22 | Gaviota de Plata and Gaviota de Oro. |
| Matteo Bocelli | Italy | Sunday, February 22 | |
| Stefan Kramer | Chile | Sunday, February 22 | |
| Pet Shop Boys | United Kingdom | Monday, February 23 | Gaviota de Plata and Gaviota de Oro. |
| Bomba Estéreo | Colombia | Monday, February 23 | |
| Rodrigo Villegas (humor) | Chile | Monday, February 23 | Gaviota de Plata. |
| Nmixx | South Korea | Tuesday, February 24 | Gaviota de Plata and Gaviota de Oro. |
| Kidd Voodoo | Chile | Tuesday, February 24 | |
| Jesse & Joy | Mexico | Tuesday, February 24 | Gaviota de Plata. |
| Esteban Düch (humor) | Venezuela | Tuesday, February 24 | Gaviota de Plata and Gaviota de Oro. |
| Juanes | Colombia | Wednesday, February 25 | |
| Ke Personajes | Argentina | Wednesday, February 25 | |
| Mon Laferte | Chile | Thursday, February 26 | Gaviota de Plata, Gaviota de Oro, Gaviota de Platino. |
| Yandel | Puerto Rico | Thursday, February 26 | |
| Paulo Londra | Argentina | Friday, February 27 | |
| Pablo Chill-E | Chile | Friday, February 27 | |
| Milo J | Argentina | Friday, February 27 | |
| TBA | | Friday, February 27 | |

== Performers per country ==
=== Argentina ===
- Alberto Cortez (1979)
- Alejandro Lerner (1993)
- Amanda Miguel (1985)
- Antonio Ríos (2001)
- Axel (2007)
- Babasónicos (2005)
- Baby Bell (1961)
- Bárbara y Dick (1969)
- Carlos García (2006)
- Charly García (2003)
- Comanche (1998)
- Coti (2008)
- Diego Torres (1996, 2003, 2005, 2012)
- Diego Verdaguer (1985)
- Duki (2025)
- El Chúcaro (1962)
- Eber Lobato (1976)
- El Símbolo (1999)
- Fito Páez (2002, 2004, 2007, 2014)
- Garras de Amor (2012)
- Gino Renni (1973)
- G.I.T. (1987)
- Gustavo Cerati (2007)
- Héctor Gagliardi (1965)
- Hugo Varela (humor) (1989, 2005)
- Jairo (1983)
- Jorge Alís (2014, 2019)
- Juan Ramón (1990)
- Katunga (1978)
- Ke Personajes (2026)
- King África (1995)
- La Mosca Tsé-Tsé (2001)
- Lali (2017)
- Leonardo Favio (1969, 1981, 1997)
- Los Alfiles Negros (1976)
- Los Auténticos Decadentes (2002, 2005, 2013, 2017)
- Los Calzones Rotos (1996)
- Los Charros (1999)
- Los Enanitos Verdes (1988)
- Los Fabulosos Cadillacs (2010, 2017)
- Los Nocheros (2003)
- Los Pericos (1995, 1997)
- Luis Pescetti (humor) (1993)
- Luis Sandrini (1960)
- Marcelo Barticciotto (1999)
- María Becerra (2024)
- María Marta Serra Lima (1985)
- Marie Claire D'Ubaldo (1995)
- Mercedes Sosa (1993)
- Miguel Mateos (1991)
- Milo J (2026)
- Miranda! (2006, 2010, 2024)
- Nahuel (1964)
- Noel Schajris (2011)
- Pablo Ruiz (1989)
- Palito Ortega (1977, 1984)
- Paulo Londra (2026)
- Pedro Aznar (2003)
- Pepe Gallinato (1972, 1974)
- Piero (1970, 1972, 2002)
- Pimpinela (1984, 2020)
- Ráfaga (2000, 2001, 2012)
- Raúl di Blasio (1985)
- Raúl Labié (1970)
- Ricardo Ceratto (1978)
- Sandra Mihanovich (1986)
- Sandro (1968, 1975)
- Santa Barbara Superstar (1976)
- Silvana Di Lorenzo (1983)
- Sin Bandera (2006)
- Sissi Lobato (1976)
- Soda Stereo (1987)
- Soledad (2000, 2002)
- The Sacados (1992)
- Tormenta (1972)
- Trueno (2024)
- Vicentico (2008)
- Víctor Heredia (1972, 2002)
- Zeta Bosio (2014)

=== Australia ===
- Air Supply (1987)
- Bond (2001)
- INXS (2003)
- Men at Work (2024)

=== Austria ===
- Opus (1986)

=== Belgium ===
- 2 Unlimited (1996)
- Martyn Chabry (2006)
- Salvatore Adamo (1982, 2004, 2012)

=== Bolivia ===
- Sandy (1993, 1999, 2000, 2004)

=== Brazil ===
- Alexandre Pires (2005, 2020)
- Anitta (2024)
- Angélica (1991)
- As Meninas (2002)
- Axé Bahia (2002)
- Café com Leite (2003)
- Elba Ramalho (1988)
- Fabio Junior (1987)
- É o Tchan! (1997)
- Joe Vasconcellos (2000, 2003, 2006)
- José Vasconcelos (1980)
- Leandro e Leonardo (1997)
- Maria Creuza (1978)
- Os Pagãos (1967)
- Porto Bahia (2003)
- Rita Lee (1985)
- Roberto Carlos (1975, 1989, 2011)
- Sandy & Junior (2003)
- Só Pra Contrariar (1999)
- Trio Irakitan (1968)
- Xuxa (1990, 2000)

=== Canada ===
- Bam Percussions (varieté) (2003)
- Bryan Adams (2007)
- Heart (1994)
- Nelly Furtado (2008)
- Paul Anka (2010)

=== Chile ===
- 31 minutos (2013)
- Alberto Plaza (1986, 1988, 1990, 1994, 1999, 2005)
- Aleste (1995)
- Alex Ortíz (humor) (2024)
- Alison Mandel (humor) (2018, 2024)
- Álvaro Salas (humor) (2000, 2007)
- Álvaro Scaramelli (1988)
- Amango (2008)
- Américo (2010, 2011, 2016)
- Andrea Labarca - (1986 Medley, 1989)
- Andrea Tessa (1983, 2001)
- Antonio Prieto (1962, 1974, 1980, 2002)
- Antonio Zabaleta (1980)
- Armando Palacios (1960)
- Ariztía (1998)
- Arturo Ruiz-Tagle (humor) (2002)
- Augusto Schuster (2018)
- Bafochi (1992, 2007, 2008, 2009, 2010)
- Bafona (1985, 1986, 1987, 1990, 2006)
- Ballet de TVN (1992, 1993)
- Bastián Paz (humor) (2013)
- Beatlemanía (1993)
- Beto Cuevas (2010)
- Bigote Arrocet (1971, 1972, 1974, 1976, 1978)
- Bombo Fica (humor) (2010, 2012, 2018)
- Bric a Brac (1968, 1969)
- Buddy Richard (1982, 1984, 1995, 2002, 2008)
- Café con Leche (2003)
- CAMI (2019)
- Canal Magdalena (2004)
- Carlos Heló (1960, 1962, 1963, 1964, 1965, 1970, 1979)
- Catalina Telias (1990)
- Cecilia Echeñique (1993, 2002)
- Chancho en Piedra (2004, 2006)
- Checho Hirane (1984)
- Chocolate (1963)
- Cinema (1987)
- Coco Legrand (1972, 1975, 1977, 1980, 2000, 2006, 2010)
- Congreso (1991, 1993, 2005)
- Conjunto Malibú (1975, 1976, 1979)
- Cristóbal (1982)
- Cuncumén (1971)
- Daniel Muñoz (2000, 2001, 2012)
- Daniela "Chiqui" Aguayo (humor) (2017, 2025)
- Denise Rosenthal (2020)
- Dinamita Show (humor) (1996, 2001, 2009, 2012)
- Dino Gordillo (humor) (1996, 1997, 1998, 2000, 2011, 2019)
- Dino Traverso (1970)
- DJ Méndez (2002, 2004)
- Douglas (2000, 2001, 2004)
- El Huaso Clavel (humor) (1988)
- Edo Caroe (humor) (2016, 2025)
- Eduardo Gatti (1991)
- El Pampero (humor) (1995)
- Enrique del Valle - Medley (1986)
- Enzo Corsi (humor) (1992)
- Ernesto Belloni (2020)
- Ernesto Ruiz "El Tufo" (1987)
- Estudiantina de la Chimba (1993)
- Fabrizio Copano (humor) (2017, 2023)
- Felo (Humor) (2005)
- Fernando Ubiergo (1982, 1985, 1993, 2001, 2009)
- Ferran Alabert (1966, 1967)
- Firulete (1960, 1961, 1965, 1966, 1968, 1971, 1979)
- Florcita Motuda (1983, 1992)
- Francisca Valenzuela (2013, 2020)
- Frecuencia Mod (1978, 1979)
- Generación 2000, del programa Venga conmigo (baile) (2001)
- Gepe (2014)
- Germán Casas (1992, 2002)
- Gigi Martin (2014)
- Ginette Acevedo (1980, 1984)
- Giolito y su Combo (2008)
- Gloria Benavides (1963, 1965, 1968, 1977, 1984, 1988, 1995, 1998, 2002)
- Gloria Simonetti (1974, 1981, 1984)
- Glup (1999, 2000)
- Gondwana (1999, 2001, 2003)
- Hermanos Zabaleta (1993, 2001 La Nueva Ola)
- Hermógenes Conache (1984, 1991, 2013)
- Horacio Saavedra y su orquesta (2010)
- Huganzas (1986)
- Illapu (1973, 1994, 1996, 2002, 2006, 2018)
- Inti-Illimani (2004)
- Irene Llano (1987)
- Jani Dueñas (2019)
- Jappening con Já (1981, 1995)
- Javiera Contador (2020, 2024)
- Javiera Mena (2016)
- Javiera Parra (2003)
- Javiera y Los Imposibles (2002)
- Jenny Cavallo (humor) (2018)
- Joe Vasconcellos (2000, 2003, 2006)
- Jorge Cruz (1987)
- Jorge Franco "El Náufrago" (humor) (1996)
- Jorge González (2013)
- Jorge "Chino" Navarrete (humor) (1994)
- Jorge Pérez (Humor) (1997)
- José Alfredo Fuentes (1981, 2000)
- Juan Antonio Labra (1988, 1989, 1990, 1992)
- Juan Luis Calderón (humor) (2017)
- Juan Pablo López (humor) (2017, 2025)
- Juana Fé (2008)
- Keko Yunge (1995, 1999)
- Kidd Voodoo (2025, 2026)
- Klaudio Showman (humor) (1989)
- Kudai (2007)
- La Ley (1993, 1994, 1995, 2001, 2002, 2005, 2014)
- La Noche (2009, 2010)
- La Sociedad (1997)
- La Sonora de Tommy Rey (2004, 2006)
- Las Cuatro Brujas (1965)
- Leon Murillo (2015)
- Leonardo Farkas (2009)
- Lorenzo Valderrama (1961, 1963, 1964)
- Los Acetatos (1974)
- Los Atletas de la Risa (2013)
- Los Blops (1971)
- Los Blue Splendor (1964)
- Los Bunkers (2007, 2012, 2024)
- Los Diablos Azules (1968)
- Los Cantores de Rucamanqui (1964)
- Los Caporales (1961, 1966, 1975)
- Los Hermanos Bustos (2005)
- Los Hermanos Campos (1965)
- Los Hermanos Silva (1962)
- Los Huasos Quincheros (1960, 1966, 1970, 1973)
- Los Indolatinos (humor) (1996, 1999, 2004)
- Los Jaivas (1983, 2002, 2010, 2011)
- Los Jockers (1967, 1994)
- Los Locos del Humor (2014, 2016)
- Los Muleros (1976, 1977)
- Los Perlas (1960, 1963, 1973, 1974, 1976)
- Los Pitusos (1993)
- Los Prisioneros (1991, 2003)
- Los Ramblers (1962, 1993)
- Los Tigres (1965)
- Los Tres (1996, 2007, 2014)
- Lucho Gatica (1992, 2002)
- Lucho Miranda (2024)
- Lucho Navarro (1961, 1969, 1981, 1992)
- Lucybell (1998, 2003, 2005, 2007)
- Luis Dimas (1977, 1996, 2001 La Nueva Ola)
- Luis Slimming (2024)
- Luis Jara (1987, 1989, 1994, 2000, 2003, 2007, 2016)
- Luz Eliana - La Nueva Ola (2001)
- Maggie (1964)
- Magic Twins (2010)
- Maitén Montenegro (1972, 1974, 1975, 1985)
- Mandolino (1985)
- Manolo González (1960, 1964, 1965, 1978)
- Manuel García (2012)
- Manpoval (2009)
- Marcelo (1984)
- Marciano (2004)
- Marcos "Charola" Pizarro (humor) (1991)
- María Inés Naveillán (1984)
- María José Quintanilla (2004)
- Mario Guerrero (2007)
- Melame (humor) (2003, 2011)
- Melón y Melame (Humor) (1998, 1999)
- Memo Bunke (humor) (2000, 2001, 2003, 2013)
- Miguel Piñera (1983)
- Miguelo (1986)
- Millenium Show (humor) (2001)
- Mon Laferte (2017, 2020, 2026)
- Monna Bell (1965)
- Monteaguilino (1989)
- Música Libre (1974)
- Myriam Hernández (1989, 1991, 1994, 2001, 2002, 2003, 2025)
- Nadie (1988)
- Nancho Parra (humor) (2013)
- Natalia Cuevas (humor) (2001, 2003, 2004)
- Natalia Valdebenito (humor) (2016)
- Natalino (2009)
- Nicole (1996)
- Orquesta Huambaly (1961)
- Óscar Andrade (1982)
- Óscar Gangas (1998, 2011)
- Osvaldo Dayz (1976, 1991)
- Pablo Bravo - Medley (1986)
- Pablo Chill-E (2026)
- Pablo Herrera (1994, 2000, 2001)
- Pachuco y la Cubanacán (1986, 1987, 1989)
- Palmenia Pizarro (2001)
- Palta Meléndez (humor) (1991, 1994, 1997, 2004, 2007)
- Pam Pam (2025)
- Pancho del Sur (humor) (1997)
- Pancho Puelma (1988)
- Paolo Salvatore (1970)
- Pat Henry (1965, 1968, 1990)
- Patricia Frías (1989)
- Patricia Sanders (1968)
- Patricio Morán (1968)
- Paulo Iglesias (humor) (1991, 1992, 1995, 1996, 2005)
- Payahop (2014)
- Pedro Messone (1967)
- Pedro Ruminot (humor) (2016, 2020, 2025)
- Pepe Tapia (1986)
- Peter Rock (1990, 2001 La Nueva Ola)
- Pettinellis (2004)
- Piña colada (humor) (1993)
- Platón humor (humor) (1992)
- Profesor Salomón y Tutu-Tutu (2008)
- Pucará (1973)
- Pujillay (1982, 1985, 1990)
- Quilapayún (1973)
- Q.E.P. (1986)
- Rachel (2001)
- Ricardo Meruane (2011, 2016)
- Rodolfo Navech (1986 Medley, 1989)
- Rodrigo González (humor) (2016)
- Rodrigo Villegas (humor) (2017, 2023, 2026)
- Ronco Retes (1978, 1984)
- Rudy Hernández (1971)
- Rudy Rey (2014)
- Ruperto (2006)
- Sebastián (1984)
- Sergio Feito (1973, 1990)
- Sergio Freire (humor) (2018, 2024)
- Sexual Democracia (1992)
- Sinergia (2008)
- Six Pack (Karkú) (2008)
- Soledad Guerrero - Medley (1986)
- Sonora Barón (2008)
- Sonora Palacios (1989, 2005, 2006, 2014)
- Stefan Kramer (humor) (2008, 2018, 2020, 2026)
- Tato Cifuentes (1973, 1974)
- The Strangers (1963)
- Tito Fernández (1992, 2001, 2002, 2004)
- Upa! (1987)
- Valentín Trujillo (2010)
- Vanessa Miller (humor) (2003)
- Verónica Villarroel (2009)
- Viking 5 (2011)
- Villa Cariño (2011)
- Willy Sabor (2003)
- Young Cister (2024)
- Zalo Reyes (1983)
- Zip-Zup (2012)

=== China ===
- Chinese State Circus (varieté) (2003)

=== Colombia ===
- Alejandra Azcárate (humor) (2018)
- Bacilos (2004, 2007)
- Bomba Estéreo (2026)
- Carlos Sánchez (humor) (2017)
- Carlos Vives (1996, 1998, 2014, 2018, 2025)
- Charlie Zaa (1998, 1999)
- Fanny Lu (2010)
- J Balvin (2017)
- Juanes (2003, 2005, 2009, 2026)
- Karol G (2023)
- Maluma (2017)
- Manuel Turizo (2024)
- Morat (2025)
- Piero (1970, 1972, 2002)
- Sebastian Yatra (2019, 2025)
- Shakira (1997)
- Soraya (2004)
- Yandar & Yostin (2014)

=== Cuba ===
- Celia Cruz (2000)
- Foxy (1980)
- Gente de Zona (2018)
- Gloria Estefan (2026)
- Jon Secada (1993)
- María Conchita Alonso (1985)
- Martika (1991)
- Miami Sound Machine (1983)
- Pitbull (2011)
- Bonco Quiñongo (2019)

=== Czechoslovakia ===
(Nowadays Czech Republic and Slovakia)

- Las Satánicas (1971)

=== Denmark ===
- Safri Duo (2004)

=== Dominican Republic ===
- 4:40 (1991)
- Ángela Carrasco (1981)
- Aventura (2011)
- Chichi Peralta (1999)
- Fulanito (2000)
- Johnny Ventura (1984)
- Julio Sabala (humor) (1994, 2006)
- Juan Luis Guerra (1991, 2000, 2006, 2012)
- Los Cantantes (1997)
- Los Ilegales (1998, 2003)
- Romeo Santos (2013, 2015)
- Sandy y Papo (1999)
- Wilfrido Vargas (1990, 1994)

=== El Salvador ===
- Álvaro Torres (1991)

=== France ===
- Emma Shapplin (1999)
- Francis Lalanne (1991)
- Kassav' (1993)
- Luis Mariano (1991)
- Natusha (1993)
- Pascale Petit (1978)
- Paul Mauriat (1980)
- Romuald (1969)
- Vaitiare (1993)
- Valerio (1983)

=== Germany ===
- Lou Bega (2000)
- Modern Talking (1988)
- Thomas Anders (1989)

=== Guatemala ===
- Ricardo Arjona (1995, 1999, 2001, 2004, 2010, 2015)

=== Honduras ===
- Banda Blanca (1992)
- Polache (2014, folk contest)

=== Ireland ===
- Des Smyth (1976)

=== Israel ===
- Mayumana (2007)

=== Italy ===
- Al Bano (1977)
- Ambra Angliolini (1997)
- Andrea Bocelli (2024)
- Annalisa Minetti (1999)
- Benito di Paula (1979)
- Claudio Baglioni (1994)
- Daniel Sentacruz Ensemble (1978)
- Ennio Sangiusto (1966, 1967, 1991)
- Eros Ramazzotti (1998, 2016)
- Franco Simone (1979, 1982, 2003)
- Gino Renni (1973)
- Iva Zanicchi (1978)
- Jovanotti (1995)
- Laura Pausini (1997, 2014)
- Loredana Perasso (1988)
- Lucio Dalla (1995)
- Matia Bazar (1979)
- Matteo Bocelli (2026)
- Miguel Bosé (1981, 1982, 1984, 1994, 1997, 2001, 2005, 2008, 2013, 2018)
- Nicola di Bari (1971)
- Ombretta Colli (1978)
- Paolo Meneguzzi (1997, 1998, 2009)
- Paolo Salvatore (1970)
- Piero (1970, 1972, 2002)
- Raffaella Carrá (1982)
- Riccardo Cocciante (1979, 1994)
- Ricos y Pobres (1984)
- Romina Power (1977)
- Salvatore Adamo (1982, 2004, 2012)
- Umberto Tozzi (1980, 2004)

=== Jamaica ===
- Inner Circle (1995)
- Jimmy Cliff (1969)

=== Japan ===
- Teal Joy (1960)

=== Mexico ===
- Alejandra Guzmán (1995)
- Alejandro Fernández (2001, 2006)
- Ana Gabriel (1992, 1995, 2014, 2020)
- Anahí (2010)
- Annatell (2003)
- Armando Manzanero (1968, 1991)
- Café Tacvba (1996, 2005)
- Camila (2009, 2012, 2017)
- Carin Leon (2025)
- Carlos Santana (2009)
- Cristian Castro (2000, 2002, 2004)
- Daniela Romo (1984)
- Dulce (1985)
- Edith Márquez (2001)
- Eduardo Palomo (1995)
- Emmanuel (1983, 1989, 1992, 1994, 2000)
- Enrique Guzmán (1963)
- Fernando Allende (1992)
- Flavio César (1997)
- Fey (1996, 2005)
- Garibaldi (1993)
- Gilberto Gless (Humor) (1997)
- Gloria Trevi (1993, 2013)
- Jesse & Joy (2014, 2018, 2026)
- Juan Gabriel (1996, 1997, 1998, 2002, 2004)
- Julieta Venegas (2005)
- Los Flamingos Mexicanos (1966)
- Los Temerarios (1993)
- Los Tigres del Norte (2006)
- Lucero (1992, 1994, 2001)
- Lucía Méndez (1983)
- Luis Miguel (1985, 1986, 1990, 1994, 2012)
- Lynda Thomas (2001)
- Magneto (1992)
- Maná (1994, 1996, 2003, 2013, 2024)
- Manuel Mijares (1990)
- Marco Antonio Solís (1998, 2005, 2008, 2011, 2016, 2019)
- Marisela (1990)
- Molotov (2004)
- Noel Schajris (2011)
- Onda Vaselina (1994)
- Pandora (1987)
- Patricia Manterola (1995, 1996, 2002)
- Paulina Rubio (1994, 2000, 2002, 2005)
- Pedro Fernández (1998, 2001)
- Pedro Vargas (1979)
- Raúl Vale (1982)
- Reik (2010, 2015)
- Río Roma (2017)
- Ricardo Arancibia (1960, 1969)
- Sin Bandera (2006, 2017)
- Thalía (1994, 1997)
- Verónica Castro (1989)
- Yuri (1984, 1991, 1995, 2011, 2019)

=== Nicaragua ===
- Hernaldo Zúñiga (1981, 1994, 2000)

=== Norway ===
- a-ha (2006)
- Titanic (1984)

=== Netherlands ===
- 2 Unlimited (1996)
- Euson (1972)
- Scott y Muriel (varieté) (2007)
- Tony Ronald (1973)
- Vengaboys (2001)

=== Panama ===
- El General (1993)
- Miguel Bosé (1981, 1982, 1984, 1994, 1997, 2001, 2005, 2008, 2013)

=== Paraguay ===
- Gloria del Paraguay (1987)
- Perla (1984)

=== Peru ===
- Chabuca Granda (1965, 1978)
- Eva Ayllón (2001)

=== Puerto Rico ===
- Yandel (2015, 2026)
- Alexis & Fido (2014)
- Calle 13 (2008, 2011)
- Carlos Ponce (1999, 2000, 2002)
- Chayanne (1988, 1991, 1998, 2000, 2002, 2008, 2011)
- Cultura Profética (2015)
- Daddy Yankee (2006, 2009, 2013)
- Don Omar (2007, 2010, 2016)
- Elvis Crespo (2000)
- José Feliciano (1984, 1985, 2006)
- Luis Fonsi (2004, 2009, 2012, 2018)
- Marc Anthony (2009, 2012, 2019, 2025)
- Manoella Torres (1987)
- Mora (2024)
- Nydia Caro (1974, 1979, 1988)
- Obie Bermúdez (2005)
- Rakim y Ken-Y (2009)
- Ricky Martin (1993, 1994, 1996, 2007, 2014, 2020)
- Tito "El Bambino" (2010)
- Tommy Torres (2014)
- Wisin & Yandel (2008, 2013, 2019)
- Wisin (2016)
- Zion & Lennox (2018)
- Bad Bunny (2019)

=== Russia ===
- David y Danya (varieté) (2002)
- Petrosyans (varieté) (2010)

=== Singapore ===
- Vanessa Mae (1997)

=== South Korea ===
- Nmixx (2026)

=== Spain ===
- Albert Hammond (1977, 1978, 1998, 2013)
- Alejandro Jaén (1986)
- Alejandro Sanz (1994, 2001, 2011, 2016, 2024)
- Álex Ubago (2004)
- Amaral (2006)
- Ana Belén (1983, 1997)
- Ana Cirré (1997)
- Ana Torroja (2001, 2007, 2016)
- Andy & Lucas (2006)
- Barrabás (1977)
- Bertín Osborne (1990)
- Bravo (1985)
- Camilo Sesto (1974, 1981, 2004)
- Chicho Gordillo (1968, 1970, 1976)
- Christina y Los Subterráneos (1994)
- David Bisbal (2003, 2005, 2019)
- David DeMaría (2006)
- Dúo Dinámico (1966, 1969)
- Dyango (1984, 1985, 1990)
- Enrique Iglesias (1999, 2000)
- Fórmula V (1969)
- Gila (1970)
- Isabel Pantoja (2017)
- Jarabe de Palo (2004)
- Javier Estrada (2006)
- Joan Baptista Humet (1983)
- Joan Manuel Serrat (1970, 1972, 1993, 2009)
- Joaquín Cortés (2001)
- Joaquín Sabina (1993)
- José Luis Perales (1983, 1984, 1997, 2012)
- Juan Bau (1976)
- Julio Iglesias (1969, 1973, 1975, 1977, 1981)
- La Oreja de Van Gogh (2005, 2007)
- Loco Mía (1992)
- Los del Río (1997)
- Los marismeños (1979)
- Luz Casal (1993)
- Manolo Galván (1975, 1976)
- Manolo Otero (1977)
- Mari Trini (1976)
- Marta Sánchez (1998)
- Massiel (1967, 1984)
- Mecano (1992)
- Melendi (2014)
- Melody (2002)
- Miguel Bosé (1981, 1982, 1984, 1994, 1997, 2001, 2005, 2008, 2013, 2018)
- Miguel Gallardo (1985)
- Nacho Cano (1997)
- Nino Bravo (1971)
- Olé Olé (1989)
- Pablo Alborán (2013, 2016, 2020)
- Pablo Abraira (1978, 1995)
- Paloma San Basilio (1979, 1983, 1986, 2014)
- Pecos (1982)
- Plácido Domingo (1994)
- Raphael (1982, 1987, 2005, 2010, 2014, 2019)
- Rocío Jurado (1980)
- Rosana (1999, 2012)
- Rosario (2003)
- Sarah Sanders (1998)
- Sergio Dalma (1992, 1993, 2002)
- Sergio y Estíbaliz (1977)
- Tony Ronald (1973)
- Trigo Limpio (1977)
- Víctor Manuel (1983, 1997)

=== South Africa ===
- Miriam Makeba (1972)

=== Sweden ===
- Ace of Base (1996)
- A-Teens (2000)
- Dr. Alban (1993)
- Europe (1990, 2018)

=== Switzerland ===
- D'Holmikers (2006)
- Krokus (1985)
- Paolo Meneguzzi (1997, 1998, 2009)

=== Tahiti ===
- Vaitiare (1993)

=== United Kingdom ===
(Includes England, Scotland, Wales and Gibraltar).

- Air Supply (1987)
- Albert Hammond (1977, 1978, 1998, 2013)
- Andy Gibb (1984)
- Bond (2001)
- Bucks Fizz (1983)
- Duran Duran (2000)
- Elton John (2013)
- Franz Ferdinand (2006)
- Jamiroquai (2018)
- Jeanette (1974)
- Morrissey (2012)
- Nazareth (1985)
- Olivia Newton-John (2017)
- Peter Frampton (2008)
- Pet Shop Boys (2026)
- Rick Astley (2016)
- Rod Stewart (2014)
- Roger Hodgson (2009)
- Shakin' Stevens (1983)
- Sheena Easton (1984)
- Shirley Bassey (1989)
- Simply Red (2009)
- Sting (2011)
- The Orchestra (2005)
- The Cult (2025)
- The Police (1982)
- The Tremeloes (1970)
- Tom Jones (2007)

=== United States ===
- Aventura (2011)
- Bacilos (2004, 2007, 2025)
- Backstreet Boys (1998, 2019)
- Becky G (2019)
- Big Mountain (1995)
- CNCO (2018)
- Cheap Trick (1990)
- Christina Aguilera (2023)
- Connie Stevens (1980)
- Creedence Clearwater Revisited (1999)
- David Hasselhoff (2001)
- Donna Summer (1994)
- Earth, Wind & Fire (2008)
- Eddie Money (1987)
- Faith No More (1991)
- Foxy (1980)
- Fulanito (2000)
- Gloria Gaynor (1980)
- Huey Lewis and the News (1994)
- Ha*Ash (2018, 2025)
- Incubus (2025)
- Joey Travolta (1980)
- John Denver (1985)
- Jonas Brothers (2013)
- Journey (2008)
- Kansas (2006)
- KC and The Sunshine Band (1981, 2009)
- Kool & The Gang (2003)
- Laura Branigan (1986, 1988, 1996)
- Lionel Richie (2016)
- Manoella Torres (1987)
- Marc Anthony (2009, 2012, 2019, 2025)
- Maroon 5 (2020)
- Martika (1991)
- Maureen McGovern (1981)
- Miami Sound Machine (1983)
- Mr. Mister (1988)
- Neil Sedaka (1980)
- Nicky Jam (2016)
- No Mercy (1997)
- Peabo Bryson (2001)
- Peter Cetera (2018)
- Peter Yarrow (1972)
- Pitbull (2011)
- Prince Royce (2012, 2018)
- Ray Conniff (1979, 1981)
- Richard Marx (1992)
- REO Speedwagon (1989)
- Romeo Santos (2013, 2015)
- Romina Power (1977)
- Santa Esmeralda (1979)
- Scott y Muriel (varieté) (2007)
- Sheila E. (1986)
- Soraya (2004)
- Tavares (1979, 1987)
- The Hues Corporation (1978)
- The Stylistics (1980)
- Toto (2004)
- Vivian Reed (1988)
- Willie Colón (1994)

=== Uruguay ===
- Chocolate Latino (2002)
- Juan Verdaguer (1980)
- Los Iracundos (1972, 1995)
- Márama (2017)
- Nietos del Futuro (2002)
- Natalia Oreiro (2001, 2002)
- Rombai (2017)

=== Venezuela ===
- Carlos Baute (2011)
- Carlos Mata (1988, 1989)
- Chino & Nacho (2013)
- Enrique Guzmán (1963)
- Esteban Düch (humor) (2026)
- Franco De Vita (2008)
- George Harris (2025)
- José Luis Rodríguez "El Puma" (1980, 1981, 1988, 1991, 1995)
- Los Fantasmas del Caribe (1994)
- Lupita Ferrer (1988)
- María Conchita Alonso (1985)
- Mirla Castellanos (1981, 1983, 1985)
- Mirtha Pérez (1969)
- Natusha (1993)
- Qué Pasa (1991)
- Ricardo Montaner (1991, 1999, 2002, 2003, 2016)
