= Cuidado con las imitaciones =

- Release date: 1948
- Running time: 80 minute
- Country: Argentina
- Language: Spanish

Cuidado con las imitaciones is a 1948 Argentine film directed by Luis Bayón Herrera during the classical era of Argentine cinema.

== Cast ==
- Rafael Carret
- Jorge Luz
- Zelmar Gueñol
- Guillermo Rico
- Juan Carlos Cambón
- Tito Martínez del Box
- Silvia Randall
- Francisco Pablo Donadío
- Ermete Meliante
- Julio Vial
- Marino Seré
- Arístides Soler
- Ana María Roig
- Blanquita Amaro
- Tato Cifuentes
