= Frecuencia Mod =

Chilean girl group

- Origin: Santiago, Chile
- Genres: Pop, Disco, Euro disco
- Years active: 1970–1986, 1994
- Label: RCA/Victor
- Past members: Dolores García (1970-1984, 1994); Soledad García (1970-1984, 1994); Patricia García (1970-1984, 1994); Macarena García (1970-1973)

Frecuencia Mod (also known as Super Frecuencia or Super in some countries) was a girl group from Chile, which achieved considerable success in Latin America and Europe at the height of the 1970s disco era. The group is also considered a pioneer to the Latin pop movement of the 1980s and 1990s.

== Biography ==
In 1970, four Garcia sisters started a music project originally called "Las Incognitas" (The Unknowns), due to the group being relatively unknown at the time. With their father as a manager, they performed at schools and festivals throughout the provinces of Chile. With the help of Paco Mairena, the girls received dance lessons and began performing songs from the New York disco wave. Just as the group was about to reach their successful breakthrough, their father and manager died. After this, the group dared to explore feminine sensuality and unequivocal sexual intention with their daring outfits, songs, and performances.

The group gradually became more known in Chile and South America. In 1978, the group was chosen to perform at the Viña del Mar International Song Festival, the largest music festival of its kind in Latin America. They were also invited to perform at the 1978 Yamaha Popular Song Contest. Soon after, they were discovered by RCA label Victor, which financed their move to Germany, where they were renamed as "Super". The group experienced a transformation while in Europe, with an attempt to merge Spanish-American music and folklore with the euro disco sound popular at the time. They worked closely with Rolf Soja and Frank Dostal, the same producers for the Baccara duo. Frecuencia Mod even appeared as backing singers on certain Baccara songs. Later that year, the group was invited to perform on Musikladen with their hit song, "Gigoló", which went on to be very successful worldwide.

In 1979, the group traveled back to their native Chile to perform in shows, such as in Sábado Gigante and Lunes gala. This would be one of the last times they would appear back in Chile. Soon afterward, in Germany, the sisters married German citizens, decided to settle in Europe, and slow down on their musical activity. By the mid-1980s, Frecuencia Mod had dissolved — although they made occasional small appearances in Germany. One of the sisters, Patricia, went on to pursue a successful solo career.

In 1994, the group made a small comeback after recording a new album in Cuba.
