= Manolo Galván =

Spanish singer-songwriter

Manolo Galván (13 March 1947 – 16 May 2013) was a Spanish singer-songwriter. He was born in Crevillent, Spain but settled in Argentina after 1981. He died in Buenos Aires, aged 66.

== Discography ==
- 1972: Mis inquietudes
- 1973: En cualquier lugar
- 1974: Te quise, te quiero y te querré
- 1975: Mi única razón
- 1976: Mi público
- 1977: Esperando el amanecer
- 1978: El ganador
- 1979: Una copa conmigo
- 1980: Cada mujer un templo
- 1981: Ámame
- 198?: A mis amigos;
- 1983: Me llaman «el Calavera»
- 1984: Pasajero de la noche
- 1985: Un caballo azul
- 1986: Suspiros de amante
- 1987: A mi edad
- 199?: El amor de mi vida
- 1994: Amor caliente
- 1997: Recuerdos
- 1998: Amor de cada día
- 2003: Alumbra alumbrando
- 2005: Clásicos inolvidables
