= Tato Cifuentes =

Chilean-born Argentine actor, singer and ventriloquist

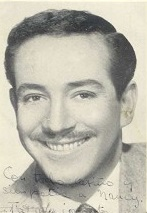
- Born: Héctor Raúl Cifuentes Lira; 14 October 1925; Santiago, Chile
- Died: 30 July 2017 (aged 91); Buenos Aires, Argentina
- Occupation(s): Actor, singer, ventriloquist
- Years active: 1948–1982

Héctor Raúl "Tato" Cifuentes Lira (14 October 1925 – 30 July 2017) was a Chilean-born Argentine actor, singer and ventriloquist. In his career, he performed in Argentine and Uruguay.

== Career ==
Cifuentes traveled to Argentine in 1950 and would remain there until his death in 2017. He was an honorary guest at the 1975 Viña del Mar International Song Festival. During his final years of his career, he had a cameo in Los Copihues, a film from Guayaquil, Ecuador.

His career began in the early 1950s. He was known for his movie roles Cuidado con las imitaciones (1948), Imitaciones peligrosas (1949) and Tiempo de crear (1962). His best known singles were "El mambo de la chocolata", "Los Tatines", and "El relojito".

== Personal life ==
Cifuentes was married five times and had one son. He suffered from male breast cancer in 2008, which he had to undergo chemotherapy. Cifuentes, who was married six times, had a critical moment in 2008 when he was diagnosed with breast cancer, for which he had to undergo several chemotherapy sessions.

== Death ==
Cifuentes was hospitalized in July 2017 after falling in the shower of his home in Buenos Aires. He later died at a hospital in Buenos Aires of cardiopulmonary arrest complicated by pneumonia on 30 July 2017 at the age of 91.
