= Álvaro Scaramelli =

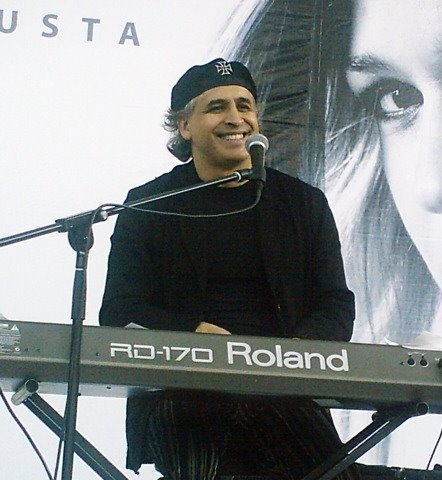

Background information
- Also known as: Álvaro Scaramelli, Topinho
- Born: Álvaro Escalona Scaramelli; September 3, 1965 (age 60); Santiago, Chile
- Genres: Pop
- Occupation(s): Singer, composer, therapist
- Years active: 1984-1987 (Cinema); 1987-2003 (solo)
- Formerly of: Cinema
- Website: www.scaramelli.cl

Álvaro Hugo Escalona Scaramelli (b. in Santiago, Chile, September 3, 1965), better known as Álvaro Scaramelli, is a Chilean singer, composer and therapist. He began his musical career in 1984 as the vocalist of the now defunct band Cinema. After the dissolution of the band in 1987, he continued his solo career. In 2000, he became the producer and manager of the Brazilian group Axé Bahia. He also composed songs for the group including Beso en la Boca, which hit number 34 on the billboard Latin pop charts. He retired from the music industry in 2003 and now is in therapeutic medicine.

== Discography ==
=== With Cinema ===
- 1985: Cinema en directo
- 1986: Locos rayados

=== Solo ===
- 1987: Mi tiempo interior
- 1988: Secretos develados
- 1989: El espejo encantado
- 1991: Ramo de flores
- 1992: Scaramelli no Brasil
- 1993: Álvaro Scaramelli
- 1994: Cinema
- 1997: Grandescaramelli
- 1997: Anécdota del viejo whisky (live)
- 1998: Canciones para la memoria
- 1999: Tiempos buenos (live)
- 2000: Greystoke
- 2003: Scaramusas
