= Tormenta (singer) =

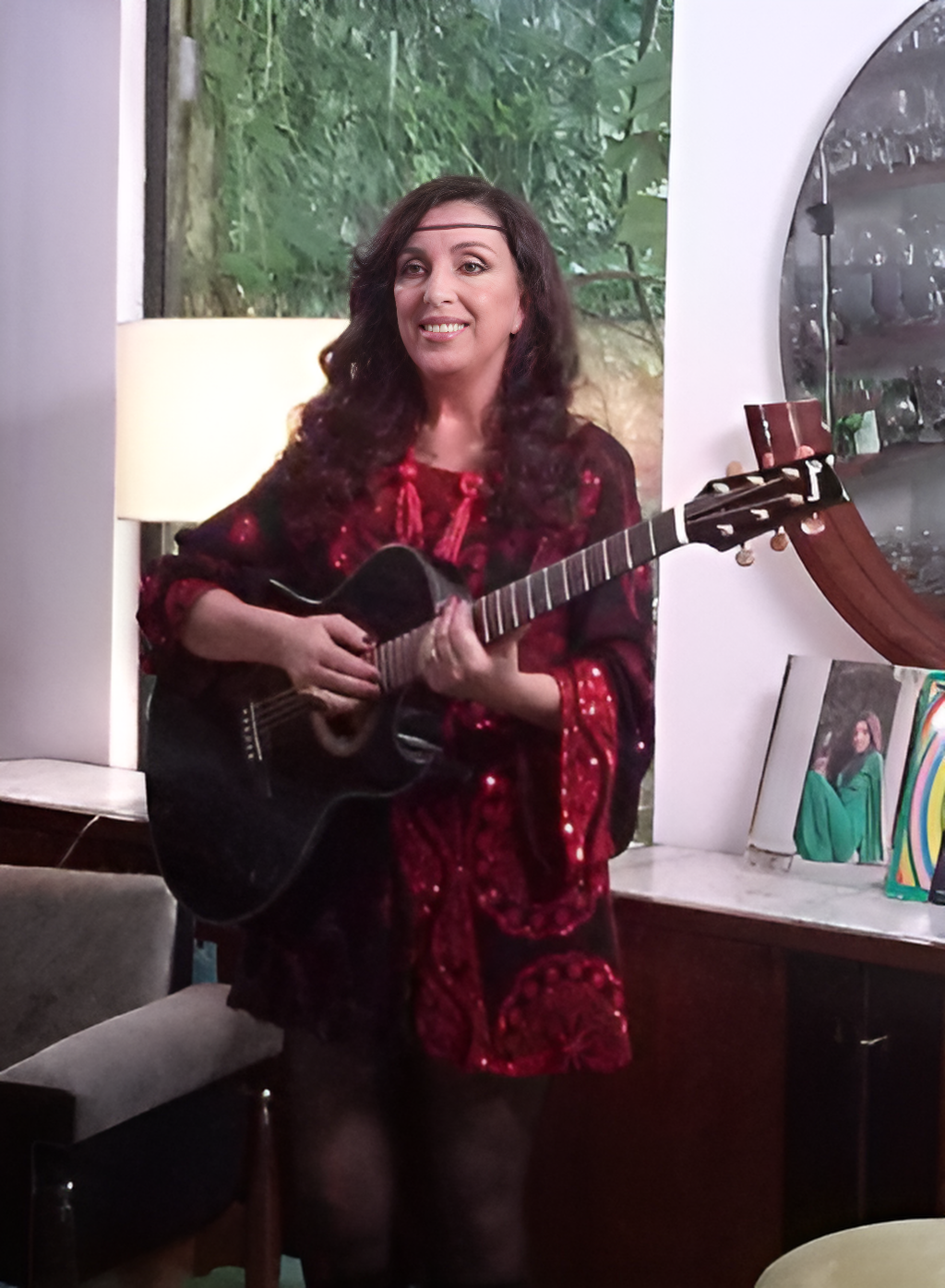
- Tormenta in 2015

Background information
- Born: Liliana Esther Maturano; December 15, 1952 (age 73); Buenos Aires, Argentina
- Genres: Pop, Latin ballad
- Occupation: Singer-songwriter
- Instrument: Vocals
- Years active: 1970–present
- Label: Independent
- Website: tormentacantante.com

Liliana Esther Maturano (born December 15, 1952), also known by the stage name Tormenta (English: Storm), is an Argentine singer-songwriter, who began writing songs from the age of 16, and who has toured internationally.

== Discography ==
=== EPs ===
- Brindo Por Ti
- Hay Un Sentimiento
- Adios, Dijimos Adios / El Hombre Del Piano

=== Compilations ===
- Por Favor Me Siento Sola Y Otros Grandes Exitos

=== Singles ===
- "Perdoname, He Sido Una Tonta"
- "Hay Un Sentimiento"
- "Yo Quiero Compartir Todo Lo Tuyo"
- "Si Fuera Como Ayer"
- "Como Una Paloma Herida"
