= 2000 Chilean telethon =

Charity event

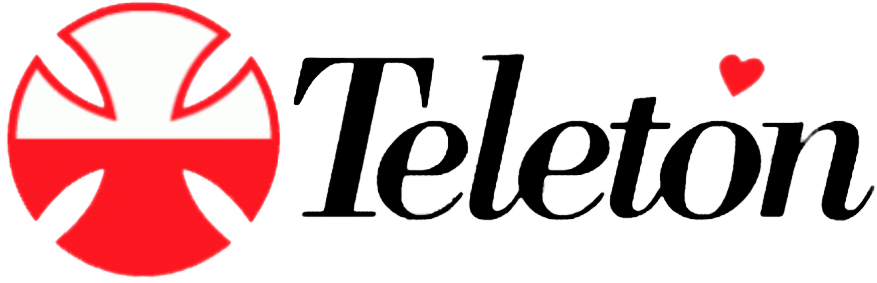
Chilean Telethon's logo

The 2000 Chilean telethon was the 16th Teletón solidarity campaign held in Chile, nicknamed the "Millennium Telethon", taking place on 1–2 December 2000. The theme for 2000 was "A Challenge to all Chileans." The goal was met and exceeded with a final collection of CL$6,772,445,028. The poster boy for the event was Ignacio Soto.

This version was performed 2 years after the previous because in December 1999, because the presidential elections took place. This was the first telethon to be held during the government of Eduardo Frei Ruiz-Tagle, making 2000 the first year the telethon was held under the leadership of Ricardo Lagos Escobar.

== Magic number ==
An idea was made to hold a contest called "El Número Mágico Teletón", or The Magic Number Telethon, which consisted of a lottery-style promotional raffle. In order to participate in the raffle, consumers would have to buy products or services from the preferred sponsors of Teletón. This was in reason of the low amount of sponsors Teleton 2000 had, which was the lowest in its history. The prize consisted of 1 million Chilean pesos worth of groceries and services from the sponsors ($1,907 from 2000, adjusted for $131,712.56 as of 2023).

The system worked from 0 to 999, with one chosen randomly and announced on the news channels of Chile, including:

- Teletrece (Canal 13 - the only channel where the result was shown on the air with an act signed before a notary)
- 24 Horas(Televisión Nacional de Chile)
- Meganoticias (Megavisión)
- Chilevisión noticias (Chilevisión)
- Telediario (Red Televisión)
- Página Uno (UCV Televisión).

Ripley, Banco De Chile, and Johnson's were the only sponsors to not participate in the promotion.

== Performances ==
At 10:00 pm on Friday, December 1, 2000 Telethon kicked off with a musical number performed by entertainer Antonio Vodanovic alongside all of the poster boys and girls from the previous crusades from 1978 to 1998 on the façade of the Teatro Teletón, where each performer (Álvaro Véliz, José Alfredo Fuentes, Cecilia Echenique, Rachel and Mala Junta) sang the end of their year's song. Don Francisco gave his traditional speech of encouragement and the best moments of past telethons were projected on a giant screen.

Among others, Pedro Fernández, Lucero, and Myriam Hernández performed. The emotional highpoint of the telethon came when Millaray Viera, the daughter of the deceased Uruguayan singer Gervasio, performed a tribute both to her father and to all those who had died and supported the charity event during the 22 years it had been running. At midnight, a group of sports professionals led by Eliseo Salazar and including such sports luminaries as Mario Mauriziano, Gert Weil, Carlos Caszely, Rocío Ravest, and Fernando González performed an original musical number. The second section began with a set of cumbias broadcast from the Teatro Monumental and performed by Daniel Fuensalida, Miguel Piñera, Luis 'Chichón' Hernández, and Gloria Aros. Other participants included Tropical Sound, Antonio Ríos, Alegría, and Organización X.

In the early hours of the morning, the comedians took the stage with celebrity performances by Checho Hirane and Cristián García-Huidobro. Memo Bunke, Millennium Show, Dinamita Show, Melón and Melame, Dino Gordillo and Daniel Alcaíno as Peter Veneno also performed. Then, the much anticipated "Vedetón arrived, presented by Leo Caprile and with the participation of Marcos 'Charola' Pizarro, where the cabaret stars Beatriz Alegret, Tatiana Merino, Marcia Saenz and Anoika Wade arrived dressed as prisoners. Those responsible for freeing them were members of the popular and controversial theatre group 'Los Sin Vergüenzas'. At dawn, the female section began with Kike Morandé and the new comedy persona Charly Badulaque, a character of Claudio Reyes. Some of the other participants were Nicolás Massú, Jorge Zabaleta, Pedro Lladser and Fernando González, who finished as the section winner.

In the morning there was a large drop-off in donations which was followed by an electrical failure that affected the whole theatre. Mario Kreutzberger asked Chilectra about the possibility of a generator. Following this was a segment of La Nueva Ola with the presenter from Radio Pudahuel, Pablo Aguilera. The children's section was then broadcast from the Central Court of the Chile National Stadium. In the afternoon Disfruta, Lider, and Santa Isabel performed. The reduction of donations was becoming worrying, leading to an improvised appearance of the Venezuelan artist José Luis Rodríguez, 'El Puma', who made a passionate speech to the Chileans to get up and take part, along with singing "El Pavo Real". Donations increased greatly after his performance.

Before going to the newscasts from the separate television channels, Lider announced that they had collected $250,387,198 in total. Following the broadcasts, the latest total of $3,524,679,023 was read out in the theatre. At 10 p.m. on Saturday, 2 December the final section began in the Chile National Stadium with the winner of "Nace una Estrella" (A Star is Born) singing the Ode To Joy. Artists such as Alberto Plaza, Lucero, Pedro Fernández, Fulanito, Gondwana, Douglas, Azul Azul, and Elvis Crespo were onstage.

The final total of $6,450,614,205 was given and Don Francisco thanked all those who had taken part in this solidarity campaign. The entertainers and artists boarded the Tren de la Felicidad (The Happiness Train) for an Olympic circuit, becoming a symbol of the campaign. In addition, over the scoreboard, written in fireworks was the phrase "Gracias Chile" (Thank you Chile), as had happened in 1995, 1996, and 1998.

== Related events ==
Distinguishing itself from previous years, Telethon 2000 also created several other events to help large companies collect significant donations.

- Lomitón: Continuously throughout the entire course of the program, all Lomitón restaurants were open from Iquique to Puerto Montt, with the aim of selling 270,000 sandwiches in about 20 hours. This goal was achieved, allowing the restaurant chain to donate CL$84,599,000 to Telethon.
- Líder: From the start of the event at the Teatro Teleton, a huge sand hourglass was run through five times (for the five letters of the word LIDER that lit up, one by one, every time the last grain of sand fell). Upon the opening of all Líder's mega-markets on December 2, the campaign would levy 100% of the purchases of all products that were on Telethon. When the last letter lit up the cost of all of the purchases in the next hour and a half throughout Chile was donated by Líder, totaling CL$250,387,198.
- Disfruta: During the afternoon at the Central Tennis Court of the National Stadium, Disfruta challenged 2,000 people to arrive wearing the Chilean colours (white, blue, and red) and a guitar. Totaling 5,000, the crowd sang first a well known song "Si vas para Chile" (When you're going to Chile) and then a popular advertising jingle about the Disfruta effervescent salts of that time. In return, Disfruta donated CL$120 million for an advanced assisted walking system for disabled children.
- Santa Isabel ("Besotón" (Big Kiss)): Also that day, but in the Playa El Sol de Viña del Mar, 1,000 couples (men and women), each carrying a bag from Santa Isabel supermarkets, simultaneously kissed for one minute. As a result, the supermarket company gave Telethon a donation of CL$25 million.

== Donation totals ==
Time (UTC-3)	Amount in pesos
22.19 (Dec. 1) (Note: First donation made in the 2000 Telethon.)	$196,131
23.49	$231,440,734
02.11 (Dec. 2)	$447,363,059
04.05	$512,499,075
11.03	$634,301,114
13.07	$867,323,021
15.10	$1,349,693,205
16.47	$1,792,335,028
18.04	$2,132,455,880
19.16	$2,598,432,057
20.30	$3,018,554,713
21.04	$3,524,679,023
23.02	$4,926,119,349
23.38	$5,380,126,421
00.18 (Dec. 3)	$5,892,329,707
00.57	$6,450,614,205

== Artists ==
=== National singers ===
- (Chile) Alberto Plaza
- (Chile) Mala Junta
- (Chile) Douglas
- (Chile) Cecilia Echeñique
- (Chile) Millaray Viera
- (Chile) Gondwana
- (Chile) Álvaro Véliz
- (Chile) La Sonora de Tommy Rey
- (Chile) Lucybell
- (Chile) Chancho en Piedra
- (Chile) La Sociedad
- (Chile) Pablo Herrera
- (Chile) (Brazil) Joe Vasconcellos
- (Chile) Tropical Sound
- (Chile) René de la Vega
- (Chile) Alegría

=== International singers ===
- (Mexico) Lucero
- (Mexico) Pedro Fernández
- (Argentina) Antonio Ríos
- (Puerto Rico) Luis Fonsi
- (Mexico) Sólo para Mujeres
- María Jean Marie
- (Puerto Rico) Nancy Guerrero
- Edo Antonio
- (Mexico) Lynda Thomas
- (Argentina) La Mosca Tsé-Tsé
- (Venezuela) Cuentos de la Cripta
- (Bolivia) Azul Azul
- (Puerto Rico) Elvis Crespo
- (Venezuela) José Luis Rodríguez "El Puma"
- (Argentina) Organización X
- (Dominican Republic) (United States) Fulanito

=== Comedians ===
- Álvaro Salas
- Peter Veneno
- Dinamita Show
- Los Indolatinos
- Memo Bunke
- Millennium Show
- Dino Gordillo
- Melón y Melame
- Charly Badulaque
- Coco Rallado
- Luciano Bello

=== Children's section ===
- Profesor Rossa
- Cachureos
- Zoolo TV

(Note: Conducted in the Central Court National Stadium of Chile.)

=== Adult's section ===
- Tatiana Merino
- Marcia Sáenz
- Beatriz Alegret
- Anoika Wade

== Trivia ==
- Plans were made to hold a Telethon in 1999, taking place on November 26 and November 27 of that year, but ended before completion. This was due to the proximity to the presidential election and on the severe economic crisis in Chile.
