= Feria Music =

- Parent company: Feria Mix
- Founded: 2005
- Founder: Empresas Feria
- Defunct: 2014
- Status: Defunct
- Distributor: Feria Mix retail network
- Genre: Latin pop; Latin rock; cumbia; Latin hip-hop
- Country of origin: Chile
- Location: Santiago, Chile

Feria Music was a Chilean record label owned by retail and entertainment company Feria Mix. Active from 2005 until 2014, it became one of the most prominent labels in Chile during the late 2000s and early 2010s, known for its diverse roster of local artists across various genres.

== History ==
=== Origins and peak ===
Feria Music emerged in 2005 as the discographic arm of Feria Mix, a long-established Chilean company with over 50 years of history in retail, music sales, and related services. The creation of Feria Music stemmed from the company's executives' desire to support the diffusion of national music, whose diffusion would be benefited from the backing of the Feria enterprise. This affiliation provided strategic advantages, including access to sell artists' material in the majority of the country's service centers and retail points operated by the group. In spite of being affiliated with a large parent company, Feria Music positioned itself as an independent label, as it did not depend on any multinational corporation for its operations or decision-making. Upon its creation, the label prioritized signing artists and bands with established trajectories, including prominent Chilean including Los Tres, Lucybell, and Los Miserables.

By the late 2000s, the label reported sales exceeding 700,000 copies during its first five years, and had become one of the dominant players in the Chilean music industry, concentrating a major share of local production and distribution alongside Sello Azul and Oveja Negra. During its peak, Feria Music maintained contracts with approximately 20 artists, handling releases for both established and emerging names in Chilean music. They also a key role in several notable career moments and commercial successes, such as materializing the return of the rock band Los Tres to active recording and promotion, as well as supporting the major commercial breakthroughs of tropical music artists Américo and La Noche.

However, Feria Music would face various challenges in the following years, mainly due to major shifts in music consumption, such as the expansion of digital downloads, online streaming services, and declining sales of physical discs.

=== Bankruptcy and closure ===
In January 2014, Feria Mix declared bankruptcy and ceased operations. While the insolvency primarily stemmed from losses in the physical retail and disc sales division (with reported losses of approximately CL$15,000 million for the parent entity), the decision directly impacted Feria Music and its ongoing contracts.

The bankruptcy filing created immediate difficulties for artists still signed to the label, as the legal process restricted access to physical stock in warehouses and complicated the settlement of outstanding obligations. No prior formal communication or negotiation regarding the pending debts was provided to most artists or their representatives before the public announcement.

A central issue following the closure was the substantial unpaid royalties owed to a large portion of the label's roster. Debts typically covered one to two years of accrued payments from album sales, tied to standard contractual terms covering distribution, manufacturing, and promotion. Notable examples of affected artists included Jordan, Inti-Illimani, Francisca Valenzuela, Álvaro Véliz, and 31 Minutos. Former artists such as Los Tres blocked planned vinyl reissues of their catalog due to long-standing unpaid royalties. Américo continued to see partial sales from earlier Feria Music releases but reported only incomplete payments.

== Former artists ==
- 31 Minutos
- Vanessa Aguilera
- Alana
- Daniela Aleuy
- Amango
- Américo
- Ángel Parra Trío
- Álex Anwandter
- Apolos
- Arenita
- Astro
- Los Bandoleros
- Los Bipolares
- Los Bunkers
- BKN
- Kel Calderón
- Canal Magdalena
- Las Capitalinas
- Casanova
- Daniela Castillo
- Combo Ginebra
- Congreso
- Croni-K
- De Saloon
- De Kiruza
- Dënver
- Douglas
- Eicy and Cody
- Amaya Forch
- Frijoles
- Garras de Amor
- Gondwana
- Jorge González
- Daniel Guerrero
- Mario Guerrero
- Marcelo Hernández
- Illapu
- Inti-Illimani
- Inmortales
- Inestable
- Luis Jara
- Javiera y Los Imposibles
- Jazzimodo
- Jordan
- Kevin Karla y La Banda
- La 29
- Sergio Lagos
- Andrés de León
- Legua York
- Margot Loyola
- Lucybell
- Lulú Jam
- Madvanna
- Megapuesta
- Leandro Martínez
- Los Miserables
- Carolina Molina
- Movimiento Original
- Natalino
- Nicole Natalino
- La Noche
- Noche de Brujas
- Sabina Odone
- Karen Paola
- Catalina Palacios
- Palmenia Pizarro
- Los Pata 'e Cumbia
- Patogallina Saunmachin
- María Jimena Pereyra
- Alberto Plaza
- Primavera de Praga
- Leo Rey
- Antonio Ríos
- Denise Rosenthal
- Sexual Democracia
- Sinergia
- Six Pack
- Sonido Ácido
- Tomo Como Rey
- Los Tres
- Los Tricolores
- Tronic
- Claudio Valenzuela
- Francisca Valenzuela
- Los Vásquez
- Claudio Valdés
- Álvaro Véliz
- Villa Cariño
- Verónica Villarroel
- Los Wachiturros
- Gonzalo Yáñez
- Zafíro
- Zaturno
