= Palmenia Pizarro =

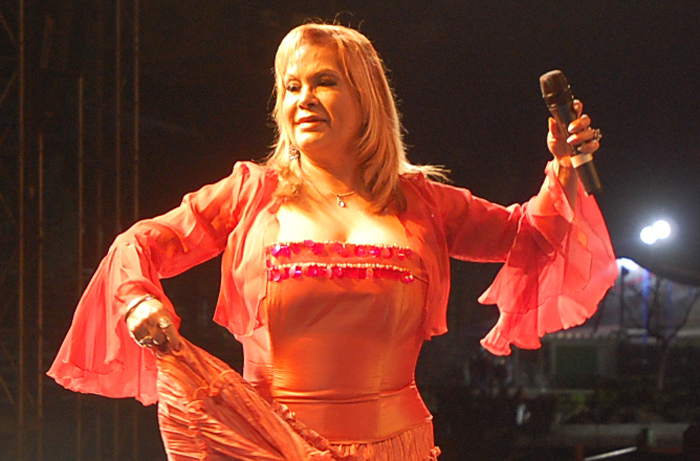
- Palmenia Pizarro

Background information
- Born: Palmenia del Carmen Pizarro González; 19 July 1941 (age 84); San Felipe, Chile
- Genres: Música cebolla, bolero, ranchera, corrido, ballad, Peruvian waltz
- Occupation: Singer
- Years active: 1961–present
- Labels: EMI; Magic Records; Philips; Embassy; CBS; Sony BMG; Sony Music; Feria Music

Palmenia del Carmen Pizarro González (born 19 July 1941), better known as Palmenia Pizarro, is a Chilean singer.

== Biography ==
Palmenia Pizarro was born in San Felipe, Valparaíso Region, in the neighborhood of El Almendral. She discovered her taste for music in childhood. Her parents and her teacher motivated her to start a long career, full of difficulties, at age seven.

When she was eleven, she moved to Santiago to try her luck as a singer. At sixteen, her talent was recognized by some radio stations, and she was awarded as "Best Folkloric Performer". Her participation in the Así Canta Perú radio contest in 1962 led the EMI label to hire her.

In 1963, songs like "Mi Pobreza" and "Amarga Experiencia" achieved spectacular sales. Her shows were blockbusters, achieving the recognition of both critics and the Chilean public.

It was with the song "Cariño Malo" by Peruvian composer Augusto Polo Campos that Pizarro achieved her breakthrough. However, a series of events, exacerbated by some journalists and Chilean television presenters (including Don Francisco), forced her to settle in Mexico. From a performance on the Televisa program Siempre en Domingo, and at the hand of the great Chavela Vargas, she achieved a successful career in that country. From there she obtained the necessary recognition to start a successful international career, which led her to appear in countries such as Australia, the United States, Argentina, and Japan (where she met Atahualpa Yupanqui and recorded two songs in Japanese).

In 1997, Pizarro returned to Chile, where she achieved important recognitions and tributes from both the world of culture and her fans.

In 2007 she joined the Canal 13 television program Cantando por un sueño as mentor of the pair of participants Carolina Vargas and Lizardo Garrido.

Palmenia Pizarro has influenced different musicians in Chile, including Mon Laferte and Los Vásquez.

== Discography ==
=== Studio albums ===
- 1962 – Un Corazón Que Canta
- 1963 – A Mi Madre
- 1964 – Palmenia Pizarro
- 1965 – Qué Lindo Canta Palmenia
- 1966 – Palmenia, Siempre Palmenia
- 1967 – Sonríele a la Vida
- 1968 – Yo Soy Su Señora
- 1970 – Sapo Cancionero
- 1985 – Reencuentro
- 1988 – Palmenia Pizarro Hoy
- 1989 – Boleros Inmortales
- 1990 – Volumen II de Boleros Inmortales
- 1991 – Para Cantarle al Mundo
- 1992 – 35 Años de Canto
- 1996 – No Morirá Mi Amor
- 1997 – Te Voy a Autografiar Mi Corazón
- 2000 – Con el Corazón en la Mano
- 2003 – Sin Concesiones
- 2008 – Contigo Viviré
- 2015 – Íntimo
- 2018 – Homenaje a Augusto Polo Campos

=== Others ===
- 2002 – ¡¡Para que se escuche bonito!! (Sony Music), "Sonríele a la Vida", theme by Luis T. Jackson

=== Special appearances ===
- 2003 – Generaciones, Dos Épocas en Dueto (Sony Music)

== Recognitions ==
In 1992 Pizarro was declared a "Distinguished Citizen in Chile". In 1999 and 2000 she received the award of the Association of Entertainment Journalists (APES) as "Best Performer", and in 2001 she was anointed with the newly created Chilean National Music President of the Republic Award. In the same year, Palmenia Pizarro debuted at the Viña del Mar Festival, where the public gave her the Silver Seagull and Gold Seagull statuettes, and the newspaper La Cuarta gave her a prize for pleasantness.

In 2002 she celebrated her 40-year career with a performance in her native San Felipe, with songs like "Recuerdos de mi pueblo", dedicated to her childhood neighborhood of El Almendral. In addition, the song festival that takes place in San Felipe in February came to be named the "Palmenia Pizarro de San Felipe Song Festival".

She was also named "Illustrious Daughter and Cultural Ambassador of the Ever Heroic City of San Felipe de Aconcagua", and the city of Los Andes named her "Outstanding Andina" for her prolific artistic career.
