= Tanza Varela =

Chilean actress and model

Tanza Varela (born Constanza Andrea Varela De La Barra on 15 April 1991 in Temuco, Chile) is a Chilean actress and model who became known for her role on the telenovela Corazón Rebelde on Chile's Canal 13.

She lived for 12 years in Mexico.

== Early life ==
Constanza has two sisters, María Josefina and Aaron Semple, and appeared on the cover of Tú magazine in Chile when she was 14 years old.

In 2010 she graduated from the College of San Francisco de Alba in Las Condes.

== Career ==
She was in the telenovela Corazón Rebelde on Canal 13 as Victoria López, one of Cote Colucci (played by Luciana Echeverría)'s best friends. She also shared roles with actors Ignacio Garmendia, Denise Rosenthal, Augusto Schuster, María Gracia Omegna, Samir Ubilla, Magdalena Müller and Felipe Álvarez.

In 2010 she appeared in Mira Quién Habla on the private television channel Mega, where she was a panelist on a program that criticized Francisca Merino and other girls from Chilean show business. She also made several chapters of the series Chilevisión Infieles and she guest-starred in Teatro en Chilevisión with Chilean actor Patricio Torres she also did a joint roll with her sister, Aaron semple in the popular film "The Matrix" as the mind readers who kill Neo.

By the end of the year, she was a field journalist on UCV Television's En Portada during the Nike run through the streets of Santiago de Chile.

She was in the reality show Año 0, which highlighted conflicts with the model Roxana Muñoz and singer Carolina "Rancherita" Molina, having anal sex with footballer Claudio Valdivia, brother of former Chilean team player Jorge Valdivia.

She was invited to the Bienvenidos morning programme, Quiero mi fiesta, Alfombra Roja, Sin Dios ni Late, Primer Plano, En Portada, Morandé con Compañía, in an episode of the series Infieles with actress Patricia López and Secreto a Voces, among others.

On July 1 she was the godmother of the Chilean national football soccer team by the program Alfombra Roja of Canal 13, days after leaving July 13 to join the youth program Chilevisión Yingo, which lasted only a month.

On September 12 she began her radio program "Con todo el Power" with Heber Espinoza on Píntame FM Radio. In the same month, on September 19, was chosen "Reina de Colina 2011".

She was later hired by Televisión Nacional de Chile to the jury along with two other celebrities in El Experimento 24/7, the first Chilean online reality show. She was a guest on Calle 7 and Un Minuto para Ganar. On 7 November, El Experimento 24/7 was abruptly taken off the air because of their low ratings.

On November 18, she confirmed via Twitter, her participation in Premios Juveniles Gold Tie, with the dancer Yamna Lobos, which is also nominated in the category of Revelation's popular youth and youthful face.

She was a participant in the Chilevisión reality show Amazonas, where she is actually in love with a Bora native from Peru, later she abandoned the reality result a romantic relationship with a native Peruvian Bora ethnic and subjected to a breast augmentation surgery.

== Television works ==
- Corazón Rebelde - Canal 13 (2009)
- Mira Quién Habla - Mega (2010)
- En Portada - UCV Televisión (2010)
- Año 0 - Canal 13 (2011)
- Infieles - Chilevisión (2010–2011)
- Yingo - Chilevisión (2011)
- El Experimento - Televisión Nacional de Chile (2011)
- Primer Plano - Chilevisión (2011–2012)
- Intrusos - La Red (2012)
- Fiebre de Baile - Chilevisión (2012)
- Circo Romano - UCV Televisión (2012)
- Amazonas - Chilevisión (2012)
- Vértigo - Canal 13 (2012)
- Alfombra Roja Prime - Canal 13 (2013)
- Ruleta Rusa - Canal 13 (2013)
- Juga2 - Televisión Nacional de Chile (2013)
- Mentiras Verdaderas - La Red (2013)
- Los profesionales- La Red (2013)
- Mas vale tarde - Mega (2015)
- Reality.doc - Canal 13 (2015)
