= Muriel Dockendorff =

Chilean student (1951 – disappeared 1974)

- Born: Muriel Dockendorff Navarrete; 2 March 1951; Temuco, Chile
- Disappeared: 6 August 1974 (aged 23); 280 Marconi, Santiago, Chile
- Political party: Revolutionary Left Movement
- Spouse: Juan Molina Manzor (m. 1973)

Muriel Dockendorff Navarrete (2 March 1951 – disappeared 6 August 1974) was a Chilean student and member of the Revolutionary Left Movement (MIR). Arrested at her home by the Dirección de Inteligencia Nacional (DINA), Dockendorff was enforceably disappeared as part of Operation Colombo.

== Early life and education ==
Dockendorff was born on 2 March 1951 in Temuco to Tomás Dockendorff Mulsow and Ana Maria Navarrete Mulsow. Initially studying social work at the University of Temuco, Dockendorff later studied economics at the University of Concepción.

Whilst studying at the University of Concepción Dockendorff became a MIR student leader. During the 1973 Chilean coup d'état Dockendorff was in Santiago. Dockendorff decided not to return to Concepción due to safety concerns.

== Arrests ==
In June 1974, Dockendorff and her husband Juan Molina Manzor were arrested by the Chilean Air Force (FACh) at their home at 280 Marconi, Santiago. Dockendorff was interrogated but later released whilst Molina remained in custody. On 6 August 1974, Dockendorff was arrested at home by DINA agents Osvaldo Romo and Marcia Alejandra Merino. Dockendorff was arrested the same day as María Angélica Andreoli Bravo, the secretary to the MIR political commission. Both of Dockendorff and Andreoli's names had been forcefully given up by Marcia Merino (known as Flaca Alejandra) under torture.

Dockendorff was first taken to Londres 38. Dockendorff is known to have shared a cell with María Cristina López Stewart, Patricia Peña Solari and Sonia Bustos Reyes in September 1974. Dockendorff was later held at Villa Grimaldi and Tres Álamos before being held at Cuatro Álamos from where she disappeared.

=== Operation Colombo ===
As part of Operation Colombo, in July 1975 Dockendorff's name appeared on a fictitious list of 119 Chileans who had allegedly died in clashes in Argentina and Brazil.

== Personal life ==
On 2 May 1973, Dockendorff married Juan Molina Manzor, a fellow economics student at the University of Concepción.
