= Música cebolla =

Genre of Chilean music

Music of Chile: Topics
Chilean jazz	Chilean academic music
Chilean nueva ola	Chilean rock
Chilean punk	Chilean heavy metal
Contemporary pop	Chilean folk music
Fusión latinoamericana	Nueva Canción Chilena
Chilean cumbia	New chilean cumbia
Cueca	Payada
Mapuche music	Andean music
History
Festivals	Viña del Mar
National anthem	"Himno Nacional"
South American music
Argentina - Bolivia - Brazil - Colombia - Ecuador - Paraguay - Peru - Uruguay - Venezuela

Música cebolla (Spanish for "onion music") is a genre of Chilean music emphasising sentimentality and intimacy. Indeed, at times the feelings expressed in música cebolla are "exacerbated". Música cebolla had its heyday in the 1950s and 1960s, and was thus contemporary to Nueva ola, the early Nueva Canción and the introduction of Cumbia to Chile.

For a long time música cebolla was derided, ridiculed or ignored by mass media.

Among older generations Palmenia Pizarro is an icon of música cebolla albeit she rejects the label. Palmenia has influenced contemporary música cebolla artist like Mon Laferte and Los Vásquez.
