= Temuco =

City in Araucanía, Chile

- City and Commune
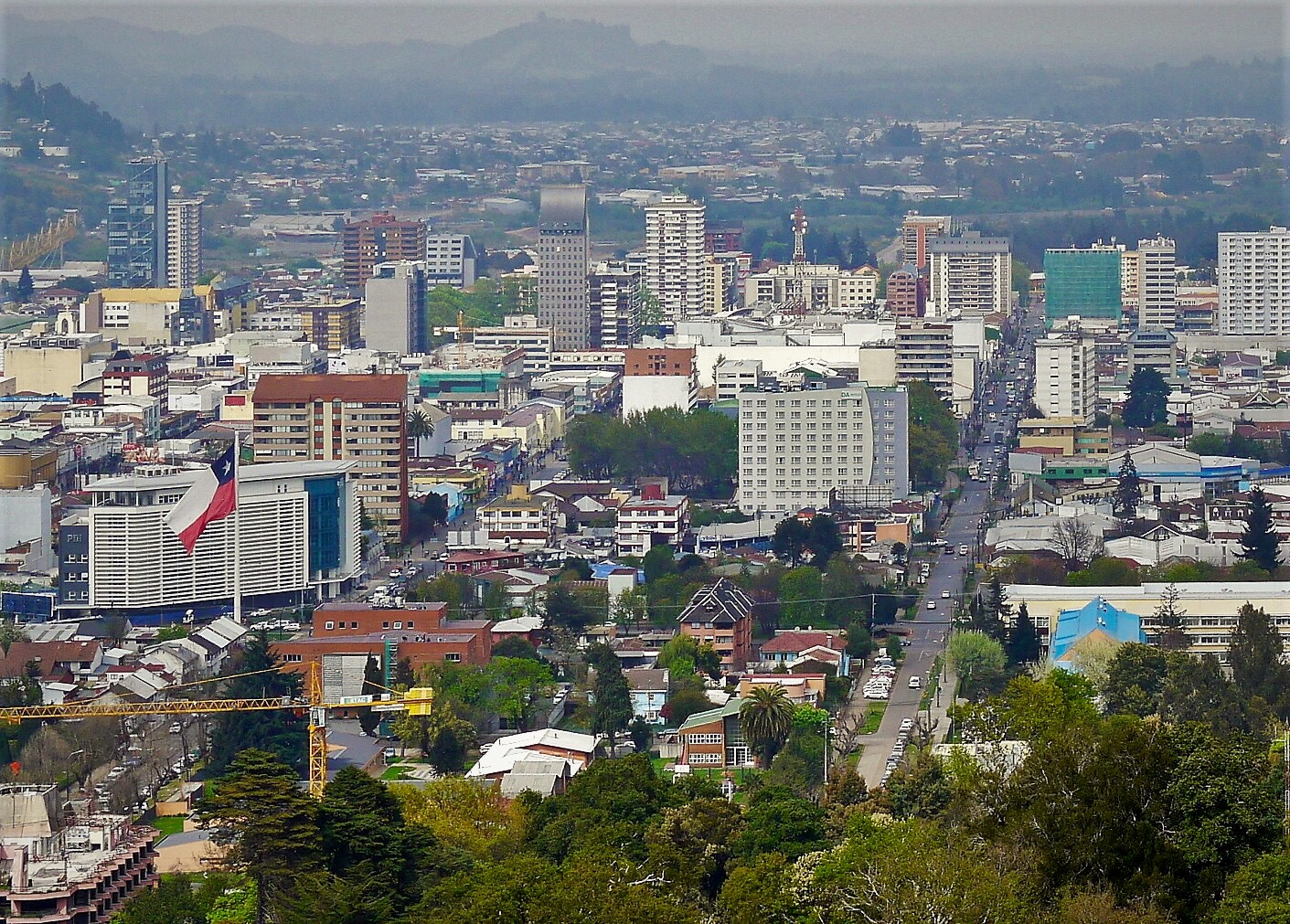
- View of Temuco from Cerro Ñielol

- Coat of arms Map of Temuco commune in Araucanía Region Location in Chile
- Coordinates: 38°44′S 72°40′W
- Country: Chile
- Region: Araucanía
- Province: Cautín
- Founded: 24 February 1881

Government
  - Type: Municipality
  - Alcalde: Roberto Neira Aburto (PPD)

Area
  - Total: 464.0 km^{2} (179.2 sq mi)
- Elevation: 360 m (1,180 ft)

Population (2017 Census)
  - Total: 282,415
  - Density: 608.7/km^{2} (1,576/sq mi)
  - Urban: 263,165
  - Rural: 19,250
- Demonym: Temucan

Sex
  - Men: 134,289
  - Women: 148,126
- Time zone: UTC−4 (CLT)
  - Summer (DST): UTC−3 (CLST)
- Area code: 56 + 45
- Climate: Cfb
- Website: Official website (in Spanish)

Temuco (Spanish pronunciation: [teˈmuko]) is a city and commune, capital of the Cautín Province and of the Araucanía Region in southern Chile. The city is located 670 kilometres (416 miles) south of Santiago. The city grew out from a fort of the same name established in 1881 during Chile's invasion of Araucanía. Temuco lies in the middle of the historic Araucanía, a traditional land of the indigenous Mapuche.

Temuco's central place in Araucanía with easy access to the Andean valleys, lakes and coastal areas makes it a hub for tourism, agricultural, livestock and forestry operations as well as a communication and trade centre for the numerous small towns of Araucanía. Temuco has recently been regarded as a university city as it houses two large universities: University of the Frontier and Temuco Catholic University. Nobel laureates Gabriela Mistral and Pablo Neruda both lived in Temuco for some time.

== Etymology ==
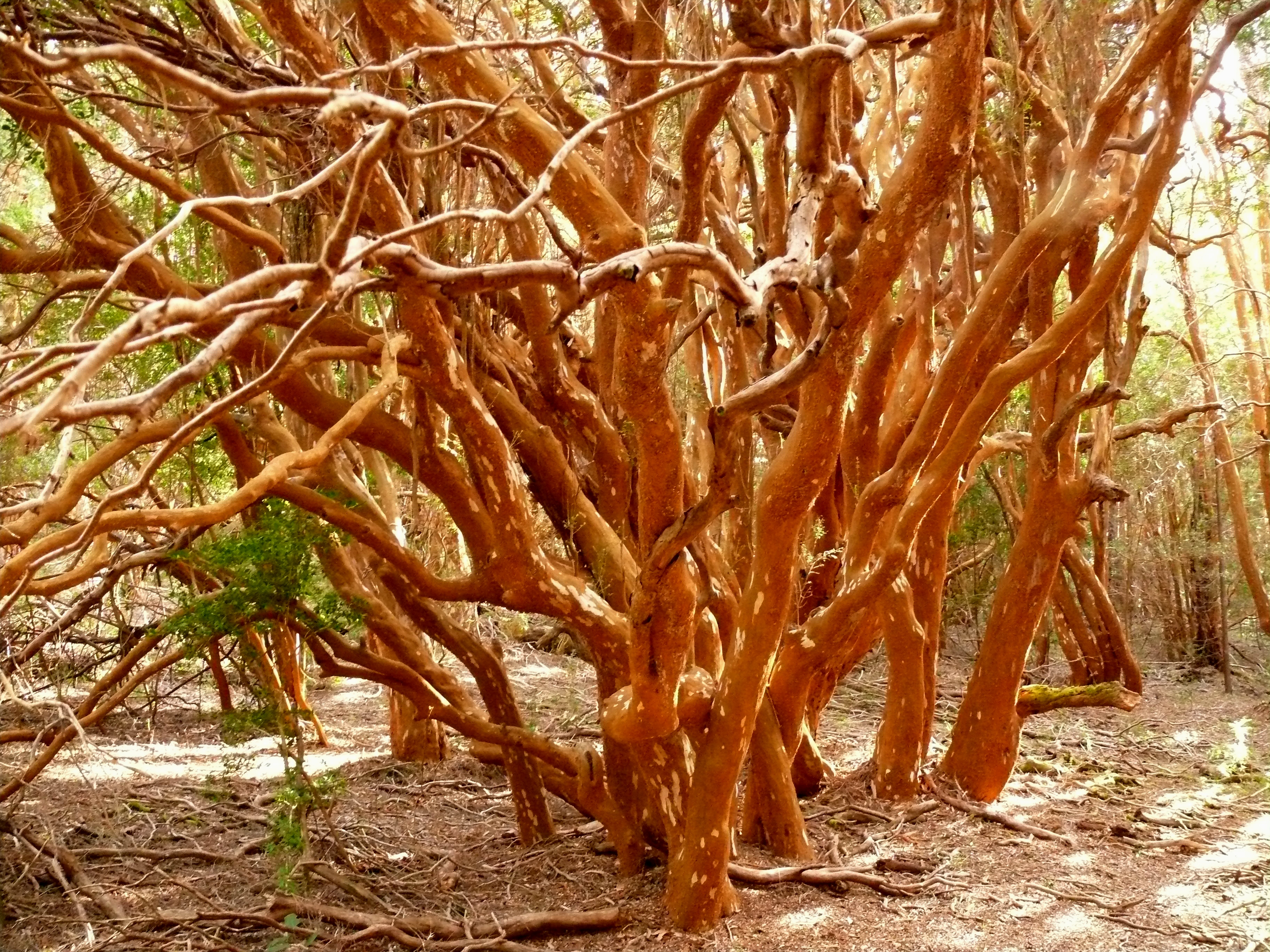
Luma apiculata

The word Temuco comes from the Mapudungun language, meaning "temu water"; "temu" is the common name of two native trees of the family Myrtaceae, Luma apiculata (also known as arrayán in Spanish) and Temu cruckshanksii. Both species are characterized by their orange-reddish bark and by having aromatic fruits and leaves which are commonly used by the Mapuche for medicinal purposes. While Temu cruckschankii is endangered, Luma apiculata is relatively common and in Temuco it is possible to see it in the Cerro Ñielol Natural Monument (in its natural state) as well as in city gardens and sidewalks. The blend between the words "temu" and "co" (water) probably reflects the fact that these trees frequently grow beside water bodies.

== History ==
The area around Temuco began to be settled by non-indigenous Chileans in the mid-1870s, when for example Labranza began to be settled.

The city was founded by Chilean army on 24 February 1881, as a fort during the Occupation of the Araucanía. Manuel Recabarren, in charge of the project, named the place Fuerte (Fort) Recabarren.

Formed as a military encampment, Temuco had in its origins the attributes of a camp, and a year after its founding, the first major streets started to form in the downtown area.

On 15 April 1888, the first city officers were elected including the first mayor José del Rosario Muñoz. The city grew quickly; a census in 1895 indicated a population of 7,708 people, and when Cautin was declared a province, Temuco became its capital, with its population by that time of 16,037 people.

Chilean poetry has deep roots in Temuco. Nobel laureates Gabriela Mistral and Pablo Neruda (Neftalí Reyes) both lived in Temuco. Mistral was the principal of an all-girls school where Neruda would visit her and show her his first verses when he was around 15 years old.

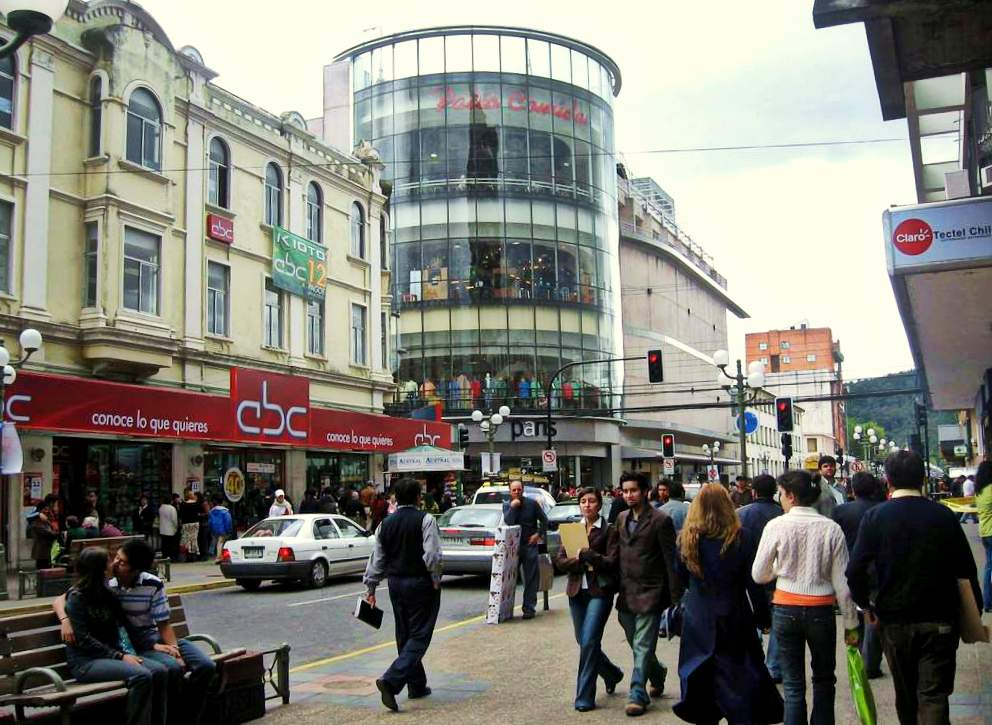
Temuco Downtown.

In 2010 Temuco was affected by the earthquake on 27 February centered 400 km (250 mi) to the north. It was one of the most affected regions of Chile besides Santiago, Concepcion, Valparaíso and others. The earthquake registered 8.8 M_{w} on the moment magnitude scale. Though landlocked Temuco avoided the tsunamis the earthquake caused, many very strong aftershocks throughout the country followed, including a 7.1 M_{W} earthquake 70 km (43 mi) northwest of the city. Nowadays, Temuco is a fast growing city with diversified commerce and services.

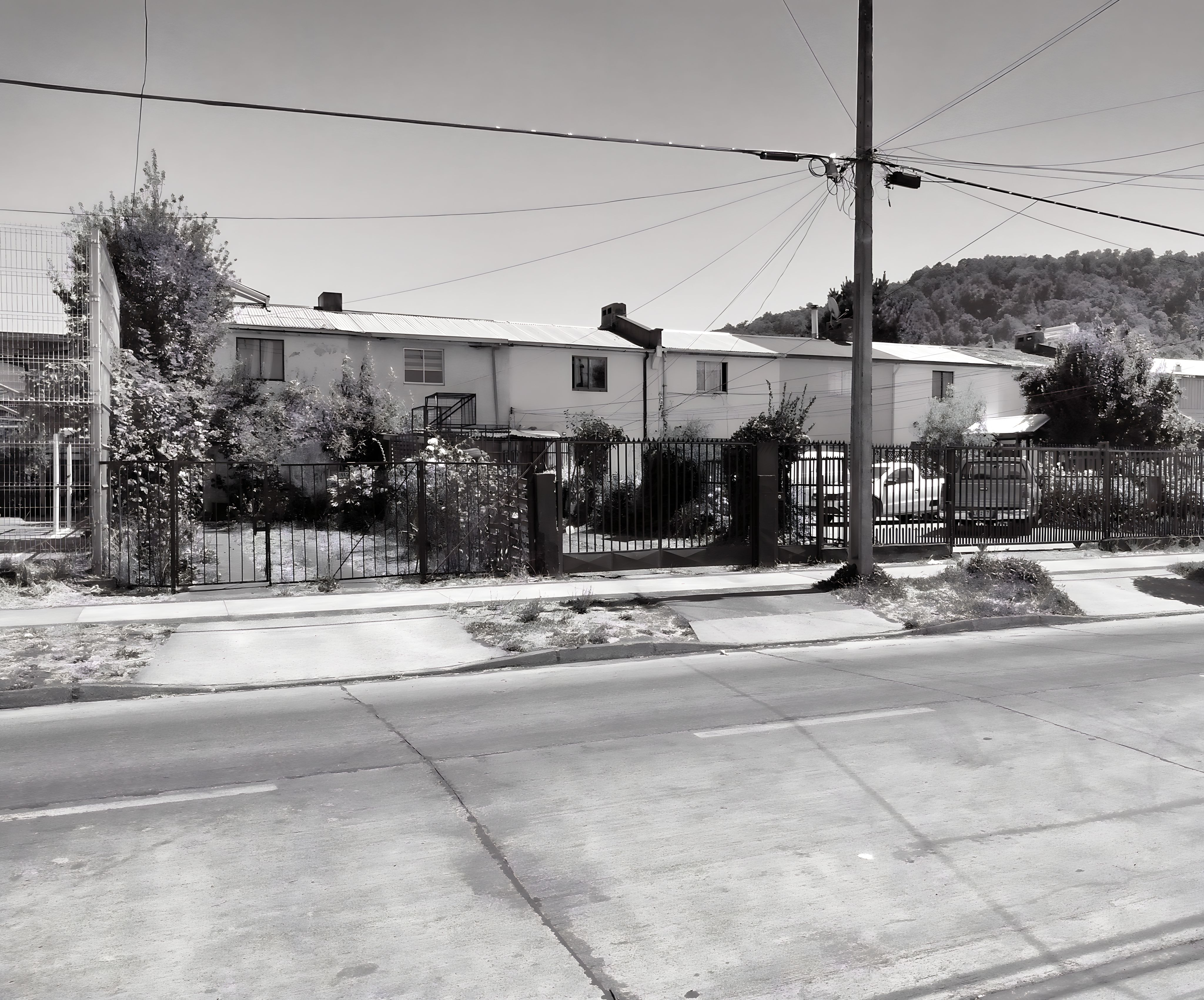
Tucapel neighborhood.

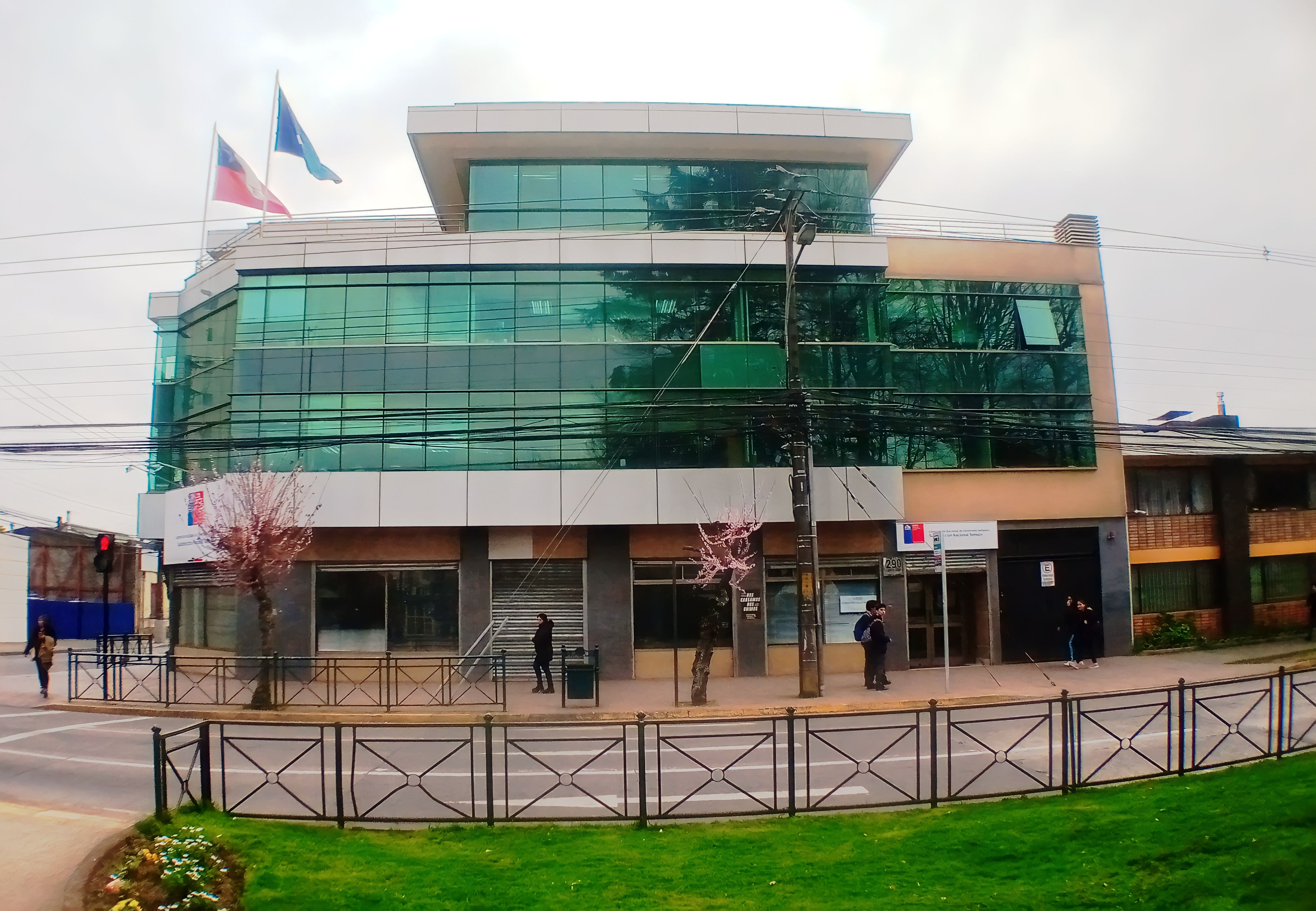
CONADI's national subdirectorate of Temuco.

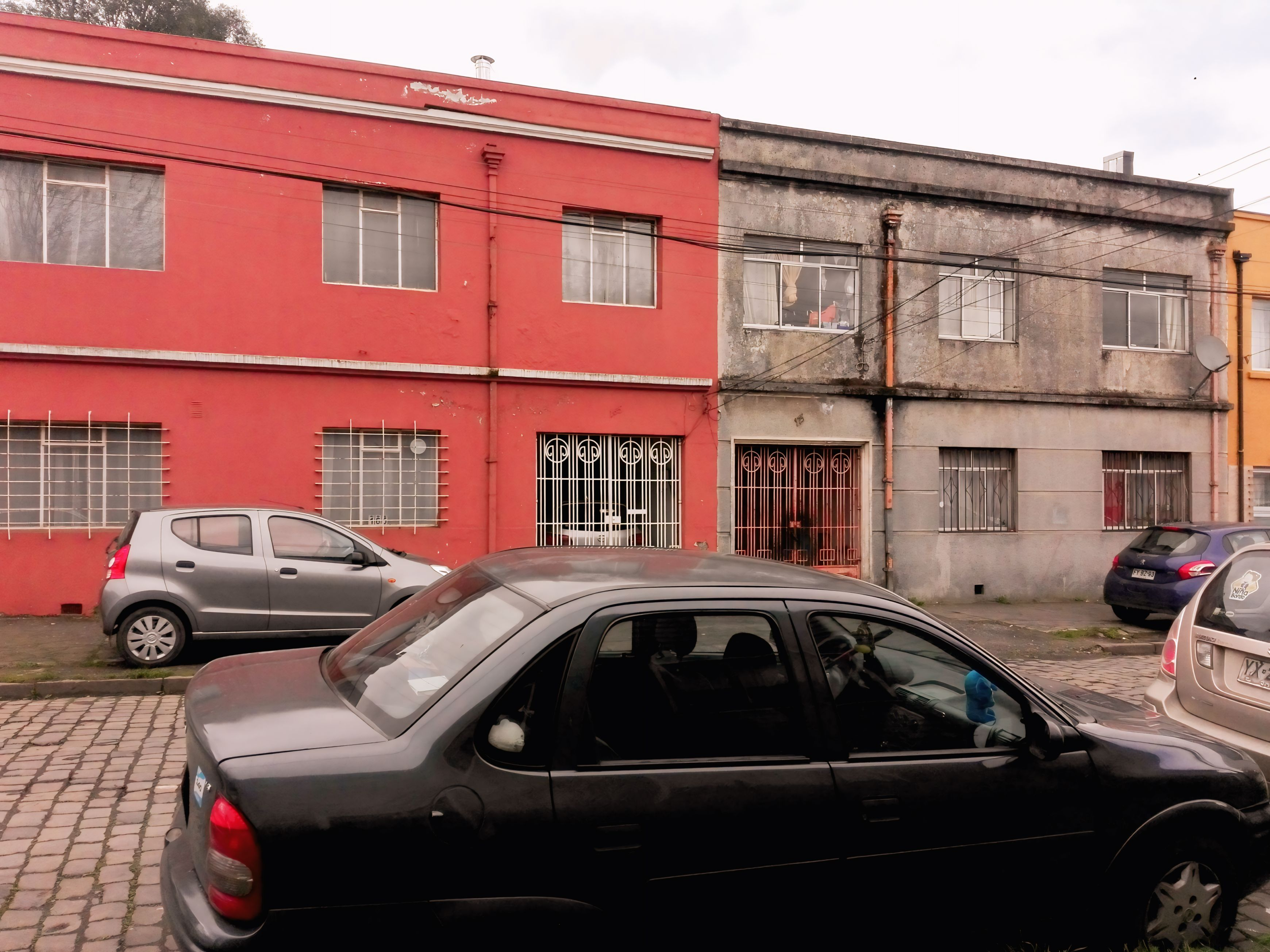
Real estates in Barrio Coilaco Historic Preservation Area.

== Demographics ==
According to the 2017 census by the National Statistics Institute (INE), Temuco had a communal population of 282,415 (134,289 men and 148,126 women). Of these, 263,165 (93.2%) lived in urban areas and 19,250 (6.8%) in rural areas. The population grew by 15.11% (37,068 persons) between the 2002 and 2017 censuses. The 2024 Chilean census recorded 292,518 inhabitants in the commune of Temuco. The Greater Temuco metropolitan area, including the neighbouring commune of Padre Las Casas, has a population of 410,520 people, which makes it the second largest city south of Santiago (behind Concepción), and the sixth largest in the country. One of the distinctive features of Temuco is the strong presence of the Mapuche culture, who make up 23.1% of the population in the Temuco commune, and numerous German immigrant colonies (9.8%). Temuco proper has a population of 227,086.

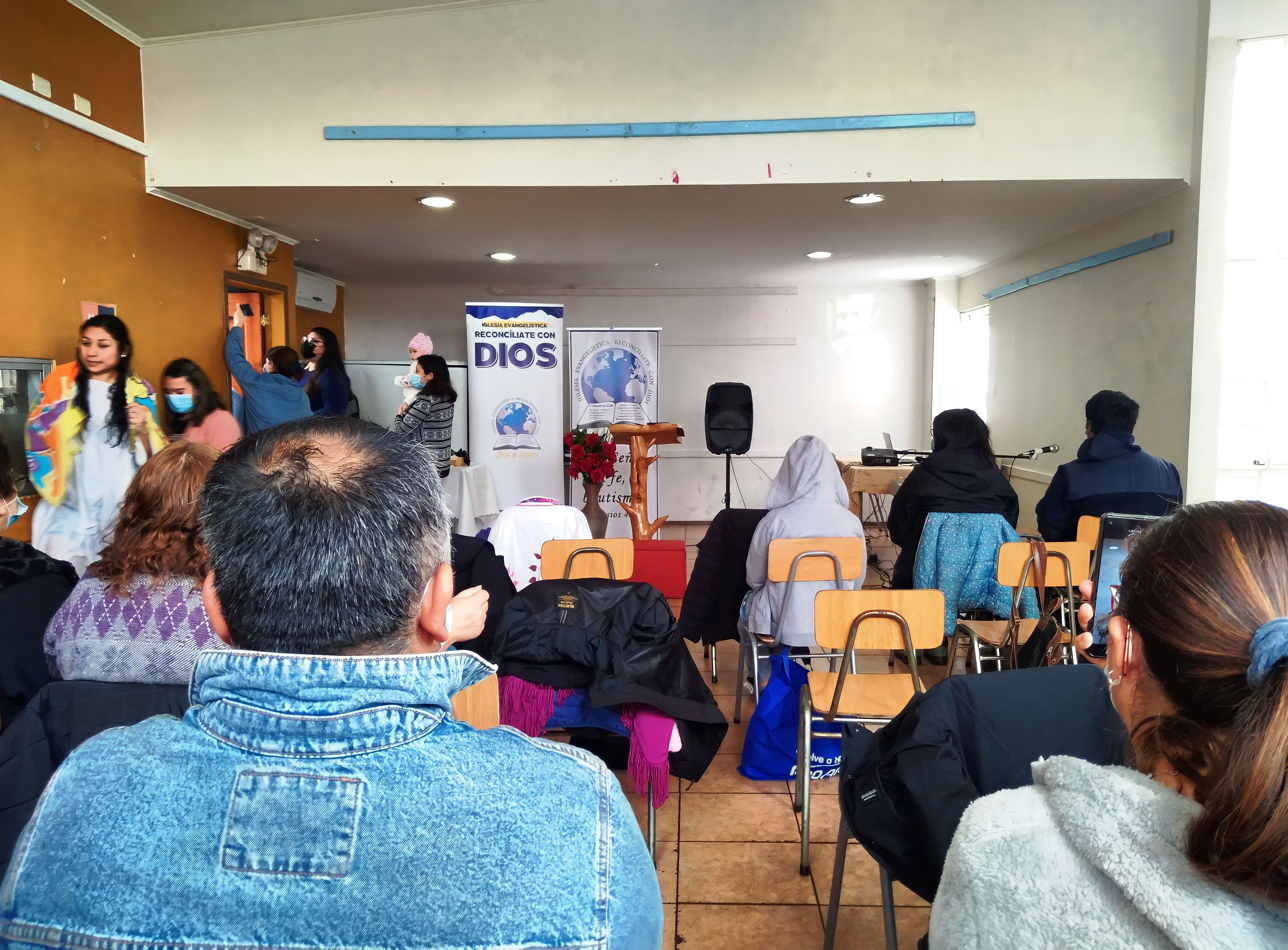
Cult of Reconcíliate con Dios Evangelistic Church, in Ampliación Amanecer Neighborhood's Community Center.

The locals are called temuquenses. The inhabitants have diverse origins. Temuco has a high percentage of people of Basque ancestry, as well as Castilian and other Spanish nationalities. There is a substantial indigenous component, mainly Mapuche, accounting for 13% of the population of Temuco, which makes it the city of Chile with the largest indigenous presence. There is also a large percentage of temuquences directly descended from European immigrants, many of whom arrived during 1883–1901. The main European sources are Switzerland, Spain, France, Germany, Italy and the United Kingdom. Others, less numerous and from many other parts of Europe such as the Netherlands, Austria, Croatia, Armenia, Greece, Portugal, etc., arrived after that first migration, especially during the World Wars. During the Spanish Civil War (1930s), a large percentage of Aragonese, Asturians, Catalans, Galicians, Navarrese and Basques reached a significant number of immigrants from Europe (mainly Spain).

There are also small communities of Jews, from Russia, Poland, Macedonia, Hungary, as well as Central and Eastern Europe in general, and Arabs, from Lebanon, Syria and Palestine. This immigration from Europe and, to a lesser extent, Jewish and Arabic areas helps to explain the various clubs, schools, and sections of the city of Temuco. There are East Asian colonies of Chinese, Japanese and Koreans in Temuco, dating back to the end of the Korean War in the 1950s when thousands of Korean refugees settled through U.N. relocation programs to Chile.

=== Religion ===
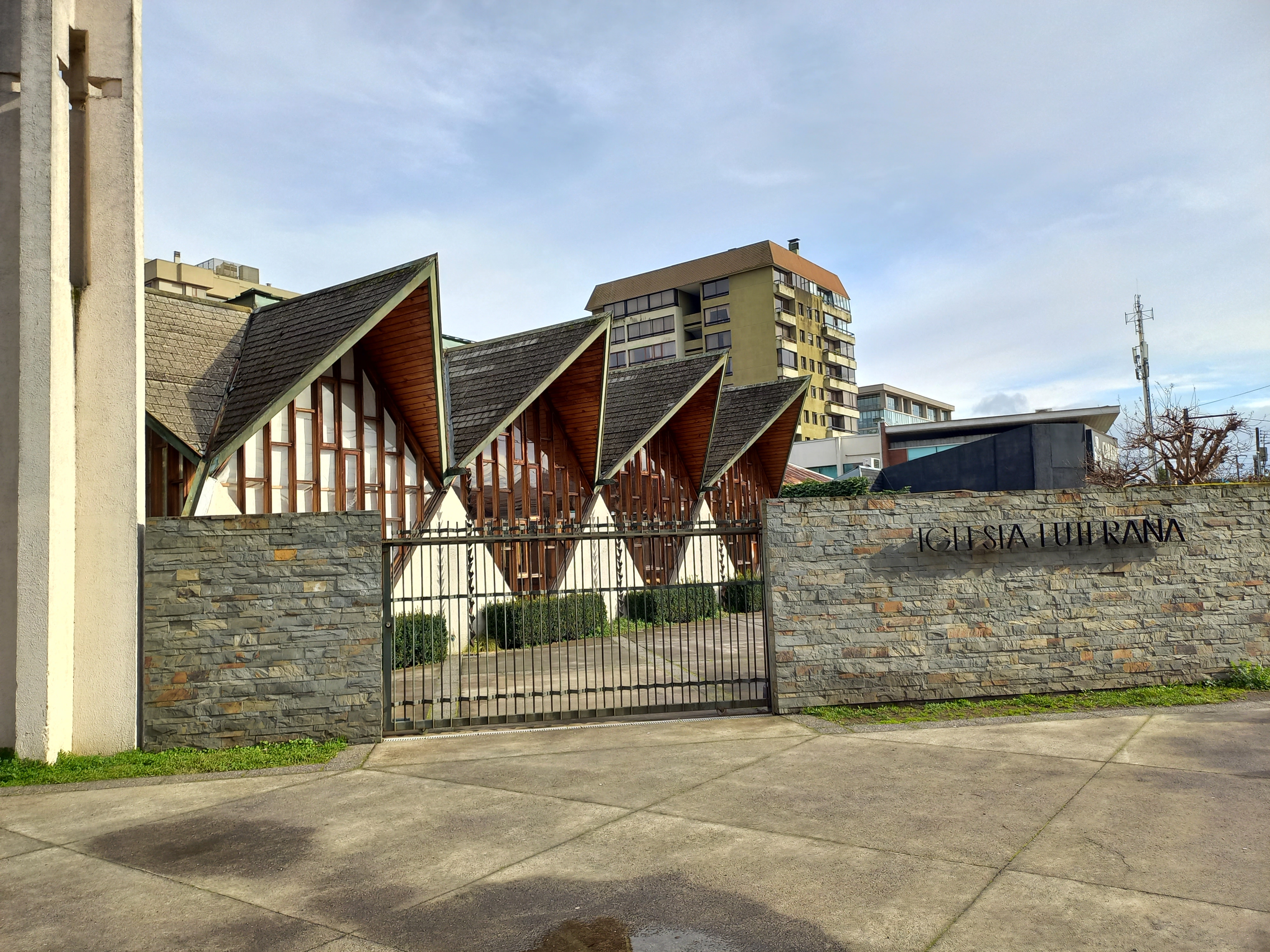
Lutheran Church of Temuco

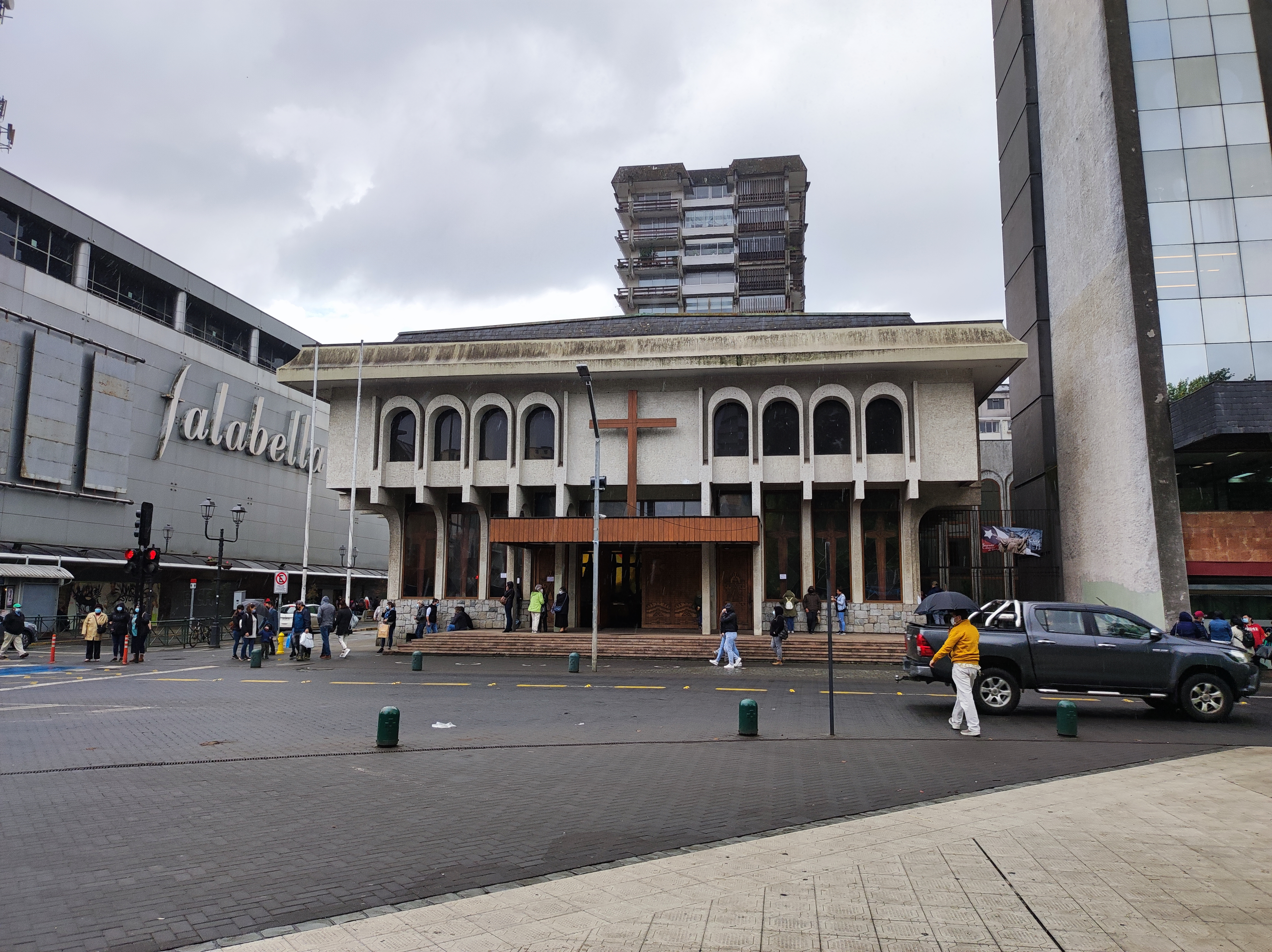
St. Joseph Cathedral

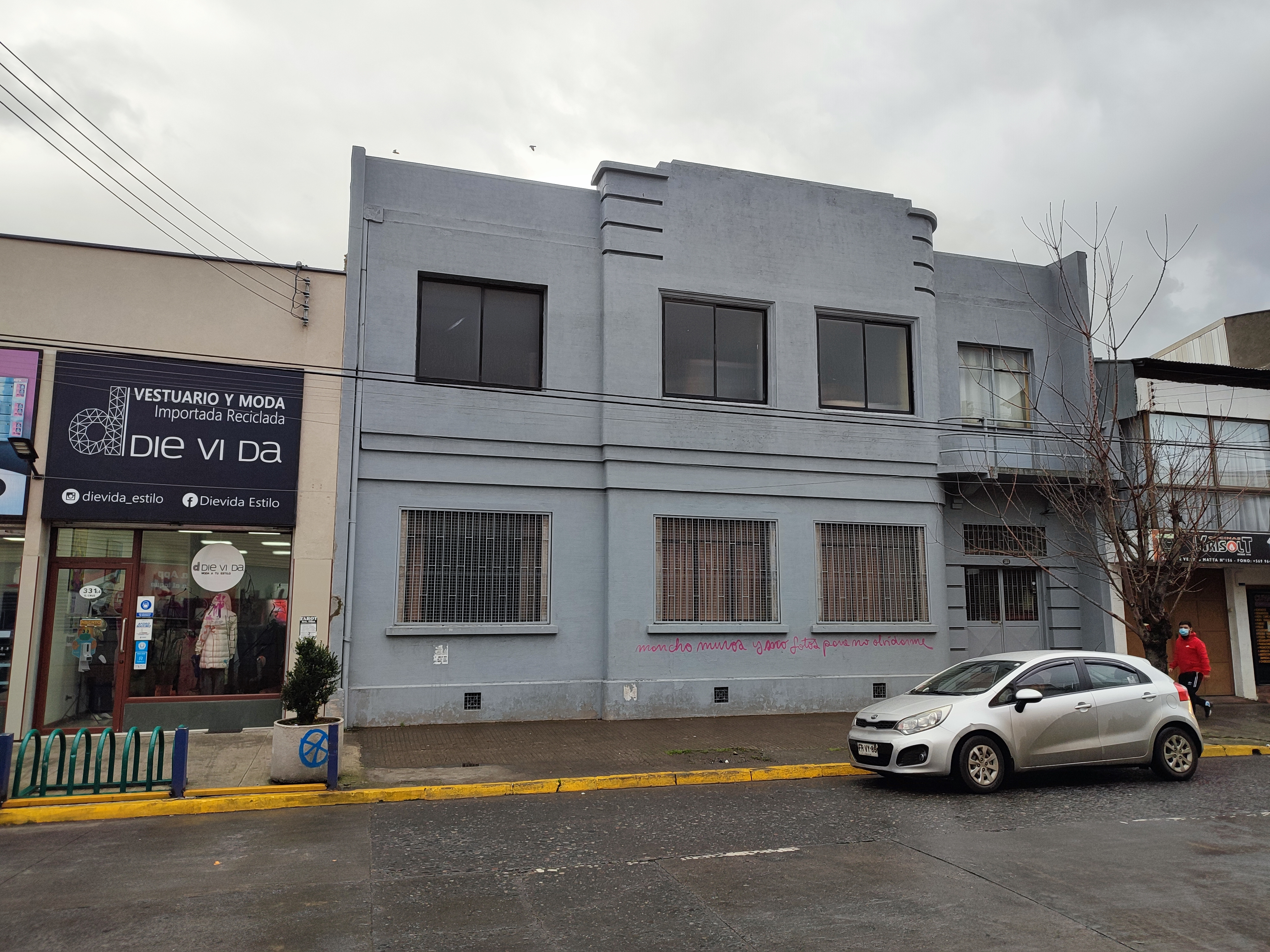
Synagogue located in the city of Temuco

Since its founding, the city of Temuco has been characterised by a mixture of religious beliefs, notably the arrival of Christianity in the lives of the pre-founding inhabitants (the Mapuche people). Ancestral beliefs are not followed by the majority of Mapuches; on the contrary, many have converted to Protestantism or Catholicism. The German colony in the city has the Lutheran Church of Temuco as its place of worship, which stands out for its unique architecture and the celebration of Mass in German.

According to data from the National Institute of Statistics, the Catholic population decreased from 69.5% in 1992 to 61.7% in 2002, and the Evangelical-Protestant population increased from 20.7% in 1992 to 23.8% in 2002. The same trend was expected for the 2012 census. However, according to Catholic sources, the percentage of the population of this branch of Christianity covered by the Diocese of Temuco in 1990 was 78%, a figure that fell to 72% in 2000, 64.7% in 2010 and reached 64.0% in 2020.

There is also a small Jewish community in the city. Officially, the first Jew to settle in Temuco was the young tailor Alberto Levy, who arrived from Bitola, now North Macedonia, in 1900. Over the years, the number of Jewish immigrants grew. Thus, by the 1907 census, there were fourteen Jews in the area, and by the 1920 census, the number was around two hundred and eighty. This community, one of the oldest in Chile, built its own cemetery and the Club Israelita de Temuco, whose founders included the Albala, Camhi, Russo, Cohen, Ergas and Levy families. The country's first synagogue, named Kahal Kadosh, was also founded in Temuco. It was inaugurated on 15 September 1928 with a ceremony in which the Sefer Torah was read and the shofar (wind instrument) was played. A children's choir conducted by Professor Jacob Palti Oplatka (the first to teach Hebrew in La Araucanía) also participated. Most of its members had not attended an Israeli religious ceremony since their arrival in Chile. The synagogue, which for a time was the headquarters of the Hebrew School, is still in use on General Cruz Street.

=== Notable people ===
- Yanara Aedo, professional footballer
- Gustavo Becerra-Schmidt, composer
- Rosa Catrileo, member of the Constitutional Convention and land rights advocate
- Fuad Chahín, politician, former president of the Christian Democratic Party
- Herminia Aburto Colihueque, Mapuche activist and politicial pioneer
- Muriel Dockendorff, student and member of the MIR who was enforceably disappeared as part of Operation Colombo
- María José Ferrada, children's author and journalist
- Dagoberto Godoy, aviator
- Fabiola Letelier, lawyer and human rights advocate
- Marcelo Moren Brito, member of Pinochet's secret police, convicted of crimes against humanity
- Pablo Neruda, 1971 winner of the Nobel Prize in Literature
- Leonor Oyarzún, former first lady of Chile
- Andrea Parra, politician
- Natalia Riffo, politician in Bachelet administration and psychologist
- Karina Riquelme Viveros, human rights lawyer
- Jorge Saffirio, politician
- Marcelo Salas, retired footballer, chairman of local football club Deportes Temuco
- Luis Salvadores Salvi, Chilean basketball player
- Raúl Sohr, journalist, sociologist and writer
- Tanza Varela, actress and model
- Ena von Baer, journalist and right-wing politician

== Geography ==
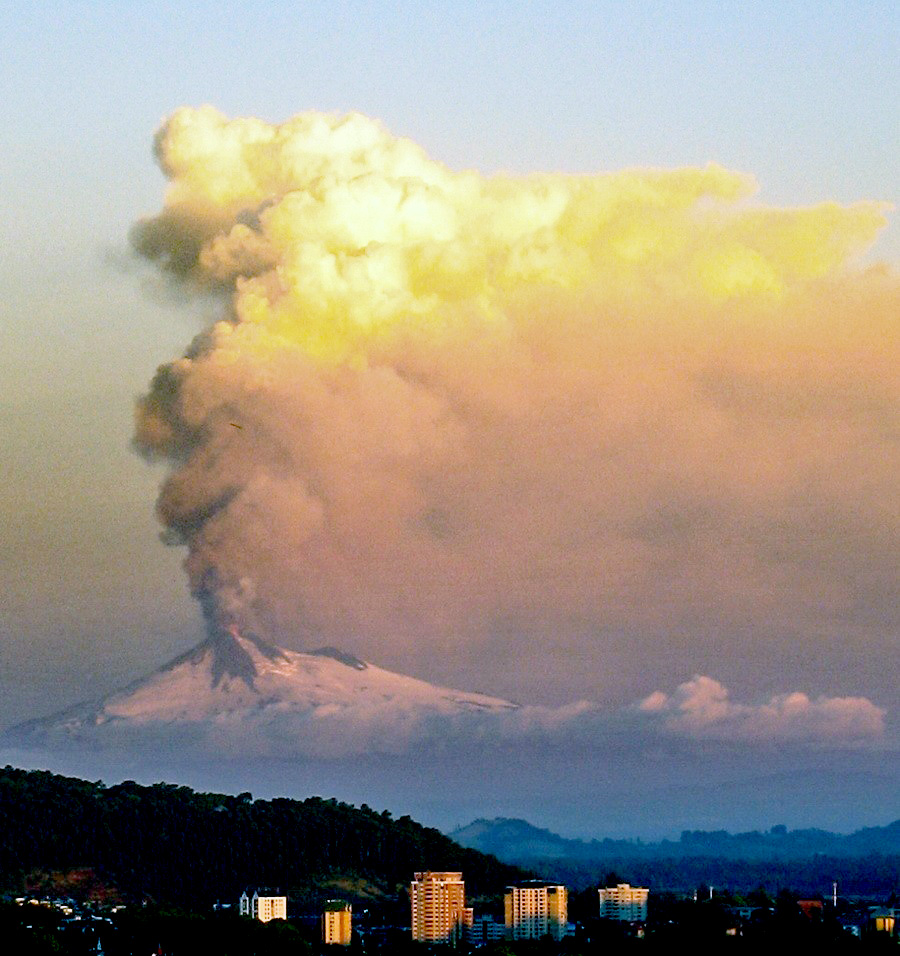
Llaima volcano located in the Andes as seen from Temuco valley

Temuco is located in a valley in the center-south of Chile, equidistant between the Pacific Ocean to the west and the Andes to the east. Morphologically, the city placement corresponds to Cautín River-originated fluvial land masses that developed in a crushed form between two hills, Ñielol (350m) and Conunhueno (360m).

== Economy ==
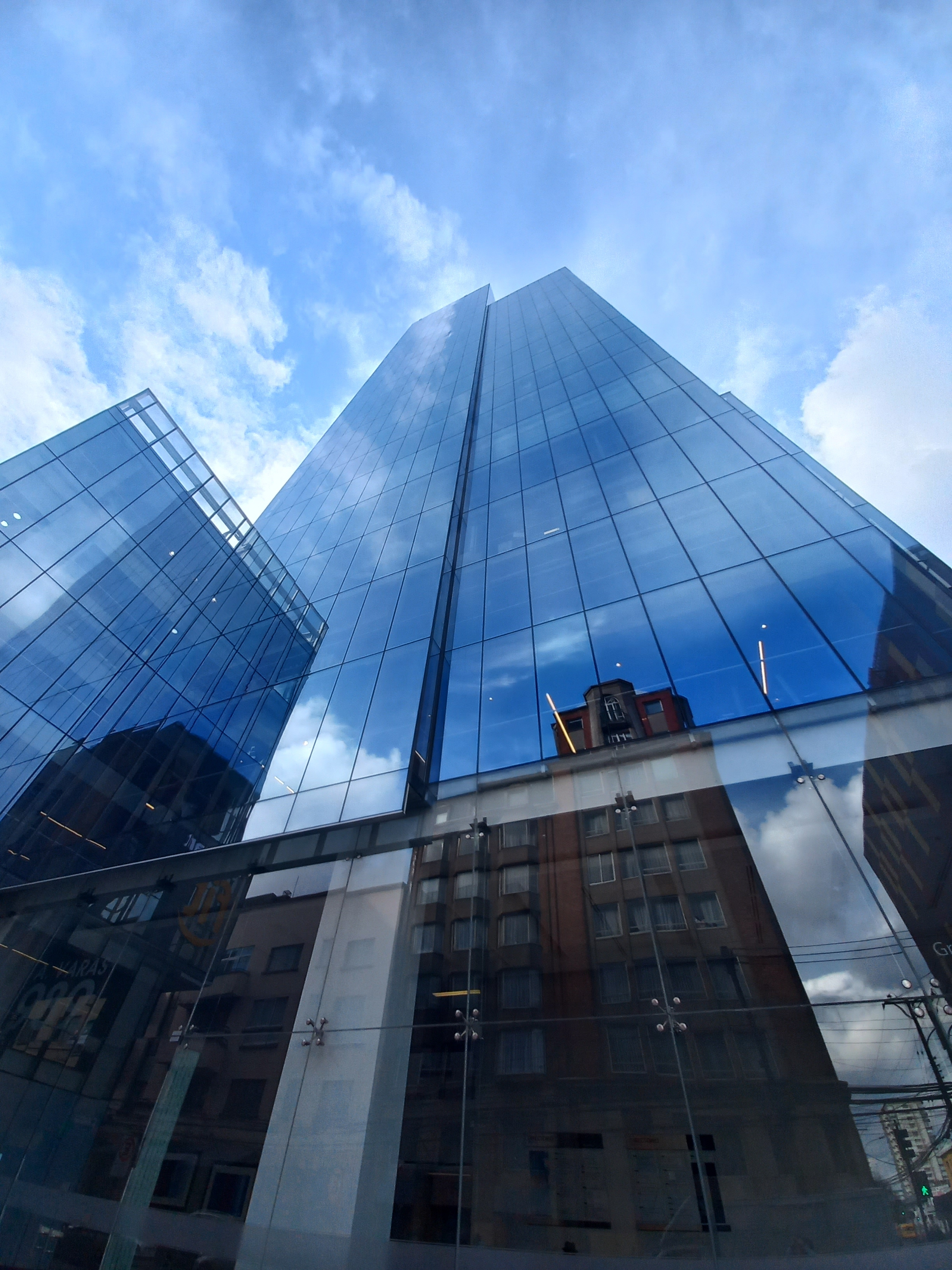
Edificio Capital in Temuco, seen from the ground.

Although the region of La Araucanía is the poorest in Chile, the city of Temuco concentrates most of the region's wealth, paradoxically positioning it as a wealthy city on par with Antofagasta, Punta Arenas, and Santiago. This is evident from per capita consumption figures in both supermarkets and shopping centers. Its metropolitan area hosts internationally recognized factories such as Rosen and Surlat, among others—especially linked to the furniture industry. Temuco also has the largest shopping mall in southern Chile, located in the Avenida Alemania district. It was built by a typical representative of the city's German community, businessman Horst Paulmann—one of the largest retailers in Hispanic America, and number one in Argentina with Jumbo. He began to build his fortune just a few blocks from where Portal Temuco stands today, in what was once Las Brisas, the region's first supermarket, where the Cencosud retail empire was born. According to the National Training and Employment Service (SENCE), there are 79 Technical Training Organizations in the region, 52 of which are concentrated in Temuco.

== International Relations ==
The city of Temuco hosts a number of international relations institutions, such as the Regional Unit for International Affairs (URAI) of the Regional Government of La Araucanía, which is responsible for the analysis and management of the region's bilateral and multilateral relations with Latin America and the rest of the world; the Regional Unit for Investment Promotion and Attraction (Invest Araucanía); the Planning, Decentralization and International Relations Commission of the Regional Council of La Araucanía; the regional office of the National Migration Service; the regional office of the General Directorate for Export Promotion (ProChile); the Department of Migration and International Police of the Investigations Police; and the Migrant Office of the Municipality of Temuco.

=== Internationalization in Higher Education ===
In terms of international relations and higher education, the main actors in Temuco are the Temuco UniverCiudad initiative, the Directorate of Internationalization and the Confucius Institute of the University of La Frontera, as well as the International Relations Office of the Catholic University of Temuco.

=== Consulates ===
Due to the large number of European immigrant descendants, various honorary consulates have been established in Temuco to assist the population. Their main functions are to facilitate procedures related to nationality and visas. They operate voluntarily to provide a closer service to those who require consular assistance. It is worth noting that Temuco is the fifth Chilean city with the largest number of consulates, only surpassed by Santiago, Valparaíso, Concepción and Punta Arenas.

==== By Historical and Immigration Significance ====
- Germany: Honorary Consulate of the Federal Republic of Germany (Honorary Consul: Carl Friedrich Fingerhuth Vorwerk)
- Austria: Honorary Consulate of Austria, under the consular jurisdiction of Valdivia (Honorary Consul: Dr. Marcos Iampaglia)
- Spain: Honorary Consulate of Spain (Honorary Consul: Antonio Gomá Segú)
- France: Honorary Consulate of the French Republic (Honorary Consul: Carl Friedrich Fingerhuth Vorwerk)
- Italy: Honorary Consulate of the Italian Republic (Honorary Consul: Italo Capurro Vattuone)
- Switzerland: Helvetic Honorary Consulate of La Araucanía (Honorary Consul: Marianne Fiala Beutler)
- Netherlands: Honorary Consulate of the Netherlands (Honorary Consul: Germán Nicklas Wickel)
- Israel: Honorary Consulate of Israel (Honorary Consul: Mario Alberto Hasson Russo)
- United Kingdom: Honorary Consulate of the United Kingdom, under the consular jurisdiction of Puerto Montt (Honorary Consul: John Kenyon)

==== Other Consulates of the Americas and Oceania ====
- Argentina: Honorary Consulate of the Argentine Republic (Honorary Consul: María Teresa Kralika)
- Brazil: Honorary Consulate of the Federative Republic of Brazil (Honorary Consul: Gilka Nese de Castro Cerqueira)
- Costa Rica: Consulate of Costa Rica in Temuco (Honorary Consul: Humberto Manuel Toro Martínez-Conde)
- Honduras: Honorary Consulate of the Republic of Honduras (Honorary Consul: José Ulises Valderrama Méndez)
- New Zealand: Honorary Consulate of New Zealand
- Peru: Honorary Consulate of the Republic of Peru (upcoming)

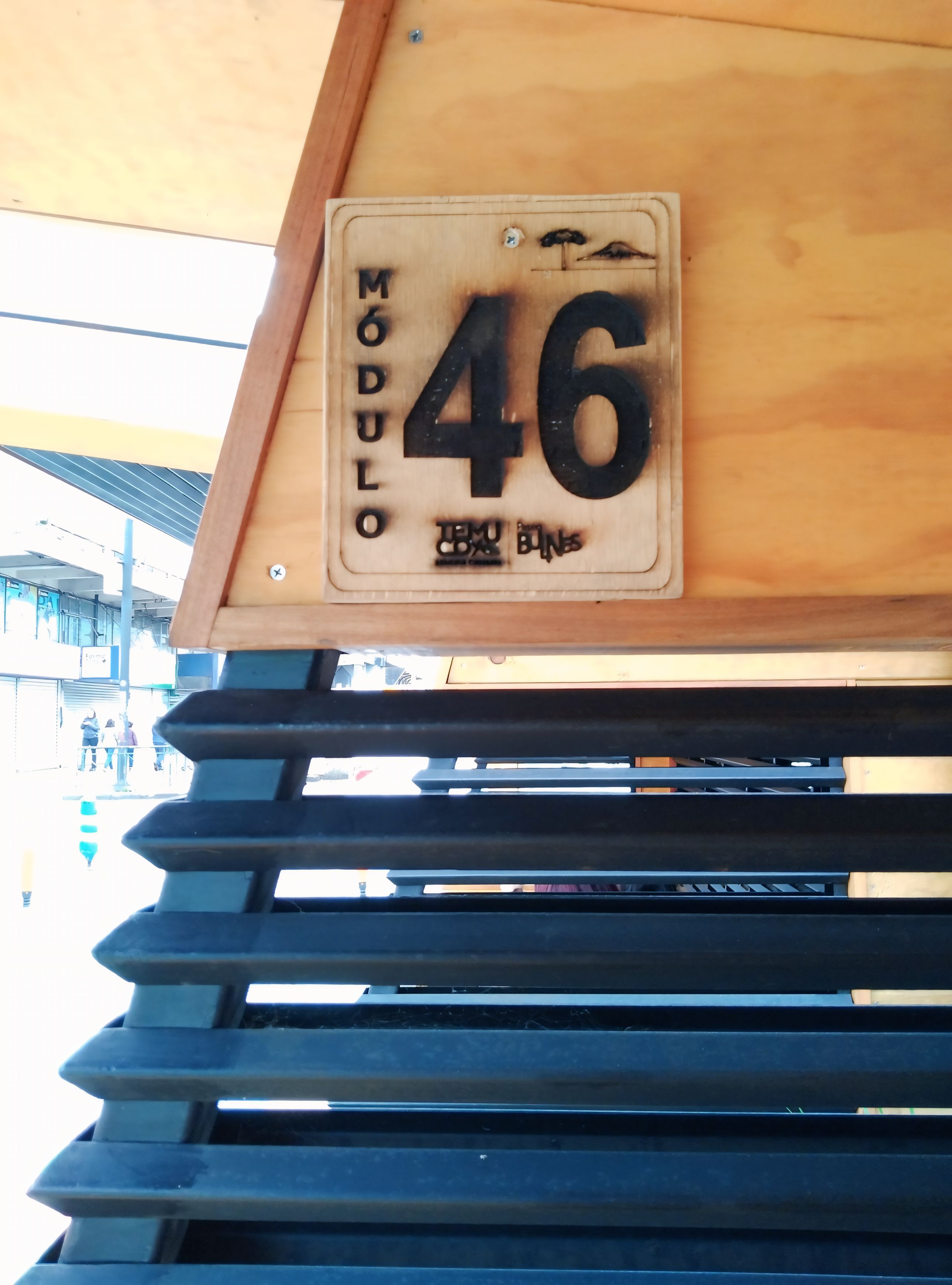
Module 46 of Bulnes Pedestrian Mall.

=== Commerce ===
Commerce in Temuco is concentrated mainly in two areas (unlike most cities where it is centralized downtown): the Avenida Alemania district and the Downtown Sector. The latter has seen significant growth due to the gentrification of San Martín and O'Higgins avenues, marked by the opening of new commercial establishments. Downtown Temuco features numerous galleries, department stores, cinemas, food courts, the Municipal Market, and the Pinto Fair (with about 600 commercial stalls), along with various services. Avenida Alemania hosts the Mall Portal Temuco, Mall Mirage, several strip centers, museums, the casino, and multiple commercial outlets. The city's economy is closely linked to the development of the service, tourism, and convention industries. It also stands out for its manufacturing sectors—particularly wood products (especially furniture), mattresses (Rosen), beverage bottling (CCU), and retail trade with neighboring communes. Temuco also showcases traditional Mapuche culture through its handicrafts, such as wooden carvings (like the Indio pícaro), musical instruments, clothing, and Mapuche silverwork, all of which are highly valued by tourists visiting the city.

== Environment ==
The city is surrounded by a landscape typical to central-southern Chile, consisting mostly of plantations of exotic species used in forestry along with prairies. The original ecosystem of the area consisting in temperate forest is present mostly in the Ñielol hill. Given that burning wood is the primary source of heat during the cold months in Temuco, air pollution is a recurrent problem during autumn and winter. As a consequence, air quality in Temuco is the third lowest in Chile.

== Climate ==
Climatologically, Temuco lies at the border of Chile's central valley Mediterranean region, albeit with a Mediterranean climate (Köppen climate classification: Csb). Through the year, cyclonic and anticyclonic influences alternate, with a distinct drier summer period (although not as dry as Santiago or other central valley cities, receiving just enough precipitation to avoid a Mediterranean climate classification). Its mean annual temperature is 13 °C (55 °F), with highest median during the warmest month of 23.5 °C (74 °F) and lowest median during the coldest month of 3.5 °C (38 °F) (Ciren-Corfo, 1992). Annual mean rain during 1961-1990 (Dirección Meteorológica de Chile, 1991) was 1,157 millimetres (45.6 in) (Capelli de Steffens et al., 1997).

Climate data for Temuco (Maquehue Airport) 1991–2020, extremes 1952–present
Month	Jan	Feb	Mar	Apr	May	Jun	Jul	Aug	Sep	Oct	Nov	Dec	Year
Record high °C (°F)	38.0 (100.4)	42.0 (107.6)	35.1 (95.2)	32.0 (89.6)	24.1 (75.4)	20.8 (69.4)	20.7 (69.3)	23.1 (73.6)	26.8 (80.2)	30.2 (86.4)	34.4 (93.9)	36.4 (97.5)	42.0 (107.6)
Mean daily maximum °C (°F)	25.0 (77.0)	25.5 (77.9)	23.0 (73.4)	18.3 (64.9)	14.6 (58.3)	12.0 (53.6)	11.7 (53.1)	13.3 (55.9)	15.5 (59.9)	17.6 (63.7)	19.7 (67.5)	22.3 (72.1)	18.2 (64.8)
Daily mean °C (°F)	17.1 (62.8)	17.3 (63.1)	15.5 (59.9)	12.4 (54.3)	10.3 (50.5)	8.5 (47.3)	7.8 (46.0)	8.7 (47.7)	9.9 (49.8)	11.6 (52.9)	13.4 (56.1)	15.4 (59.7)	12.3 (54.1)
Mean daily minimum °C (°F)	9.2 (48.6)	9.0 (48.2)	8.1 (46.6)	6.5 (43.7)	6.0 (42.8)	4.9 (40.8)	3.9 (39.0)	4.2 (39.6)	4.3 (39.7)	5.7 (42.3)	7.2 (45.0)	8.5 (47.3)	6.5 (43.7)
Record low °C (°F)	−0.2 (31.6)	−1.9 (28.6)	−2.0 (28.4)	−4.0 (24.8)	−5.4 (22.3)	−6.9 (19.6)	−8.1 (17.4)	−6.7 (19.9)	−4.3 (24.3)	−3.0 (26.6)	−2.4 (27.7)	−0.2 (31.6)	−8.1 (17.4)
Average precipitation mm (inches)	27.8 (1.09)	34.2 (1.35)	43.8 (1.72)	85.6 (3.37)	148.0 (5.83)	209.6 (8.25)	156.7 (6.17)	135.4 (5.33)	86.4 (3.40)	81.0 (3.19)	57.3 (2.26)	49.0 (1.93)	1,114.8 (43.89)
Average precipitation days (≥ 1.0 mm)	3.6	3.6	5.5	8.6	12.5	16.5	15.3	14.6	10.8	9.6	7.2	6.0	114.0
Average relative humidity (%)	72	72	77	83	87	88	87	84	81	79	78	75	80
Mean monthly sunshine hours	303.8	265.6	226.3	147.0	111.6	75.0	89.9	124.0	171.0	179.8	210.0	272.8	2,176.8
Mean daily sunshine hours	9.8	9.4	7.3	4.9	3.6	2.5	2.9	4.0	5.7	5.8	7.0	8.8	6.0
Source 1: Dirección Meteorológica de Chile
Source 2: NOAA (precipitation days 1991–2020), Universidad de Chile (sunshine hours only)

== Administration ==
As a commune, Temuco is a third-level administrative division of Chile administered by a municipal council, headed by an alcalde who is directly elected every four years. The 2008-2012 alcalde is Miguel Becker Alvear (RN).

Within the electoral divisions of Chile, Temuco is represented in the Chamber of Deputies by Germán Becker (RN) and René Saffirio (PDC) as part of the 50th electoral district, together with Padre Las Casas. The commune is represented in the Senate by José Garcia Ruminot (RN) and Eugenio Tuma Zedan (PPD) as part of the 15th senatorial constituency (Araucanía-South).

== Sports ==
Temuco, is as well known as "La ciudad del deporte" which means, the city of sports. Temuco hosts one of the newest as well as biggest stadiums in the country, the "German Becker" stadium; home to the local soccer team "Deportes Temuco".

This stadium has hosted numerous local sports events, as well as international ones. They are as follows:

- FIFA U20 Women's World Cup in 2008
- WORLD RUGBY's U20 RUGBY WORLD TROPHY in 2013
- AMERICAN CUP's in 2015

Temuco was also one of the host cities of the official 1959 Basketball World Cup, where Chile won the bronze medal. Further to that, Temuco has numerous gyms and parks where people can go on their leisure time.

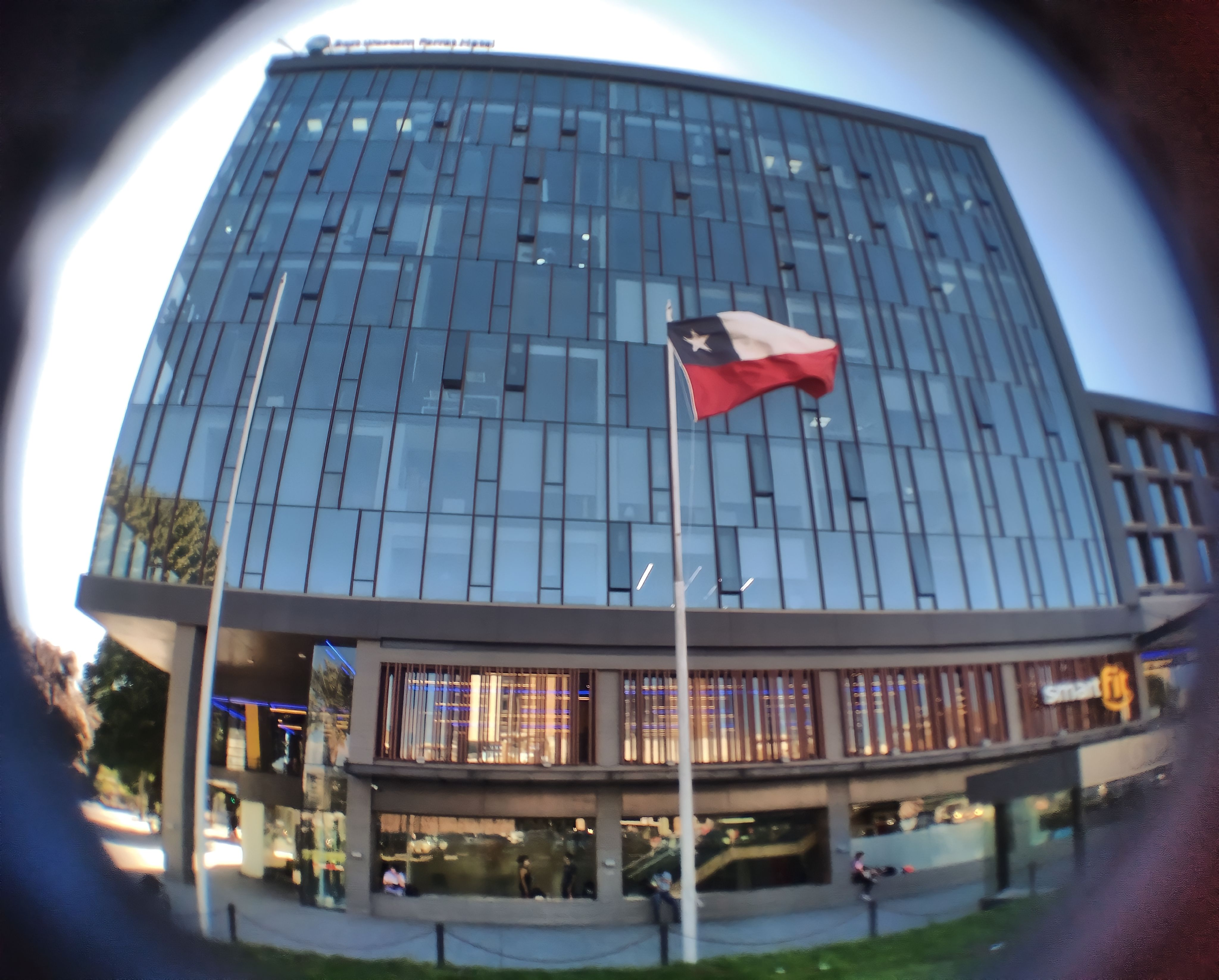
Paseo de las Artes Building.

== Transportation ==
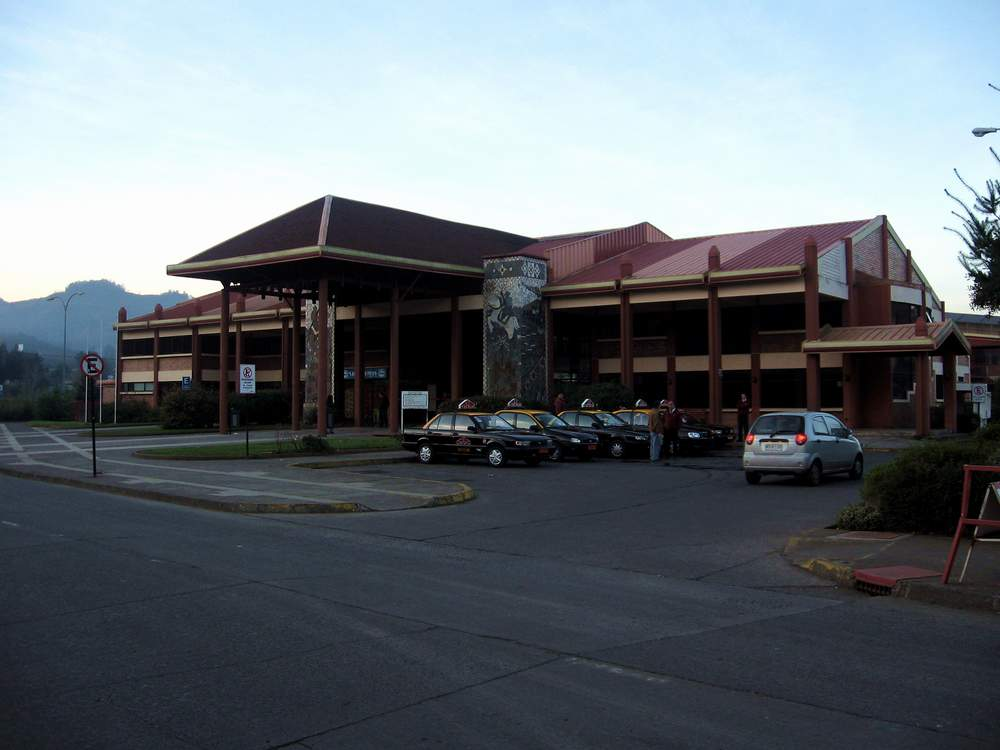
Terminal Rodoviario.

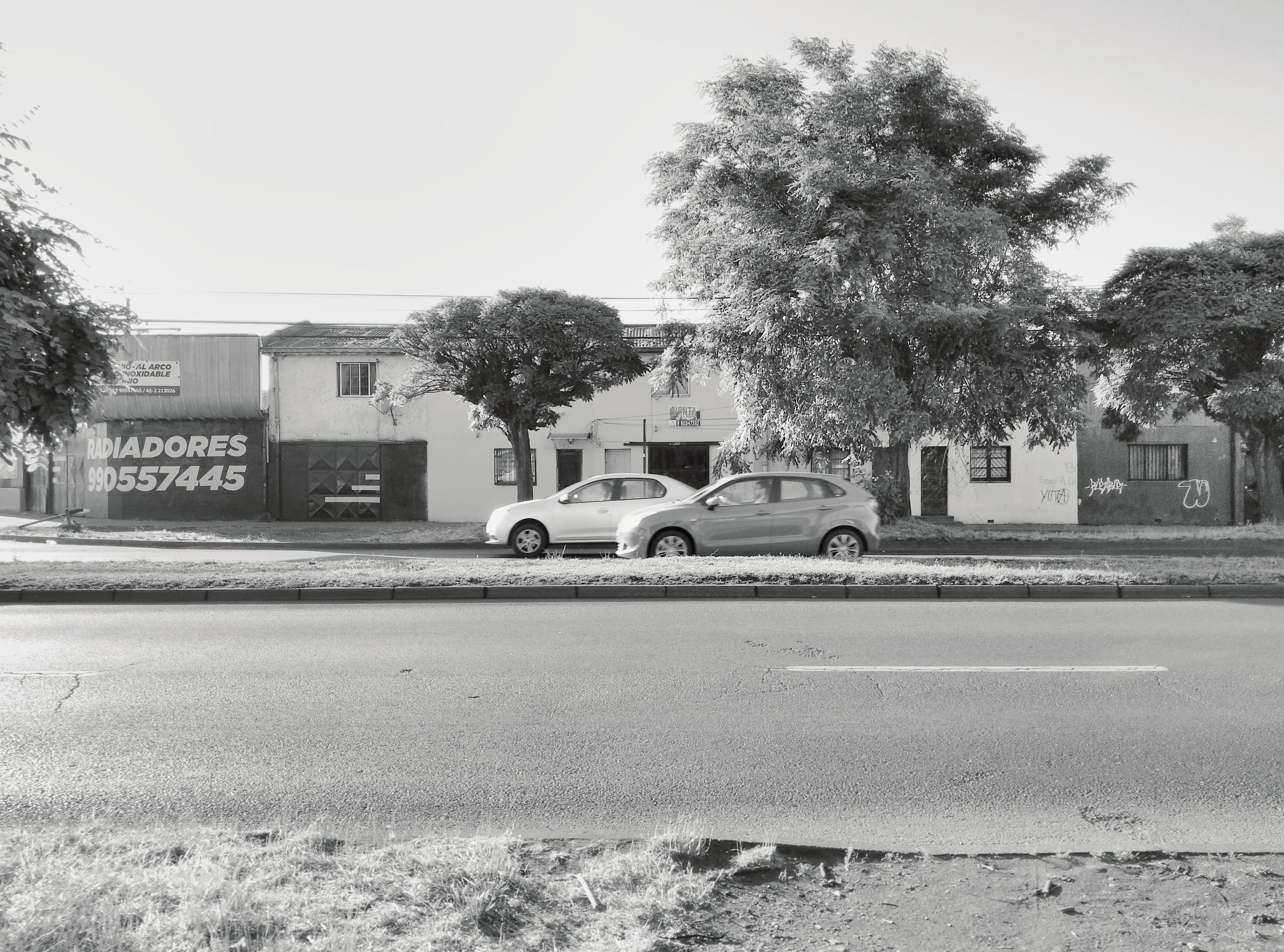
Caupolicán Avenue.

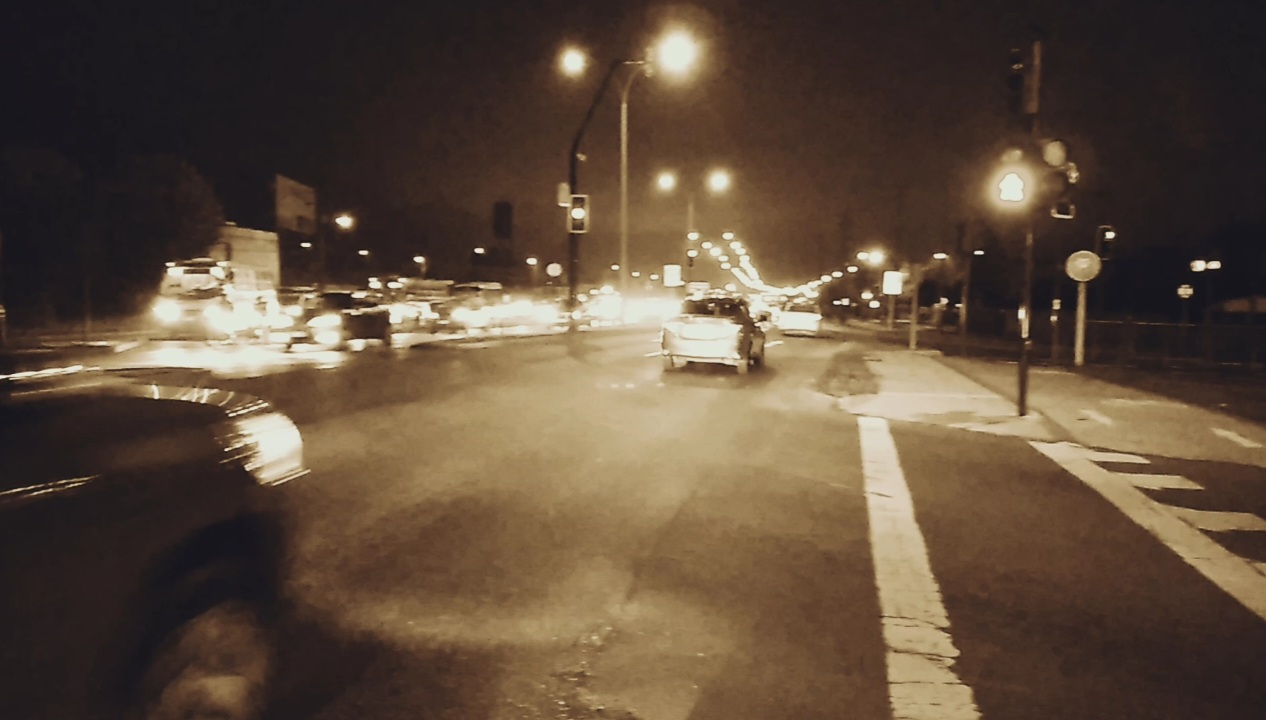
Crossing of Manuel Recabarren and Francisco Salazar avenues, in Amanecer quarter.

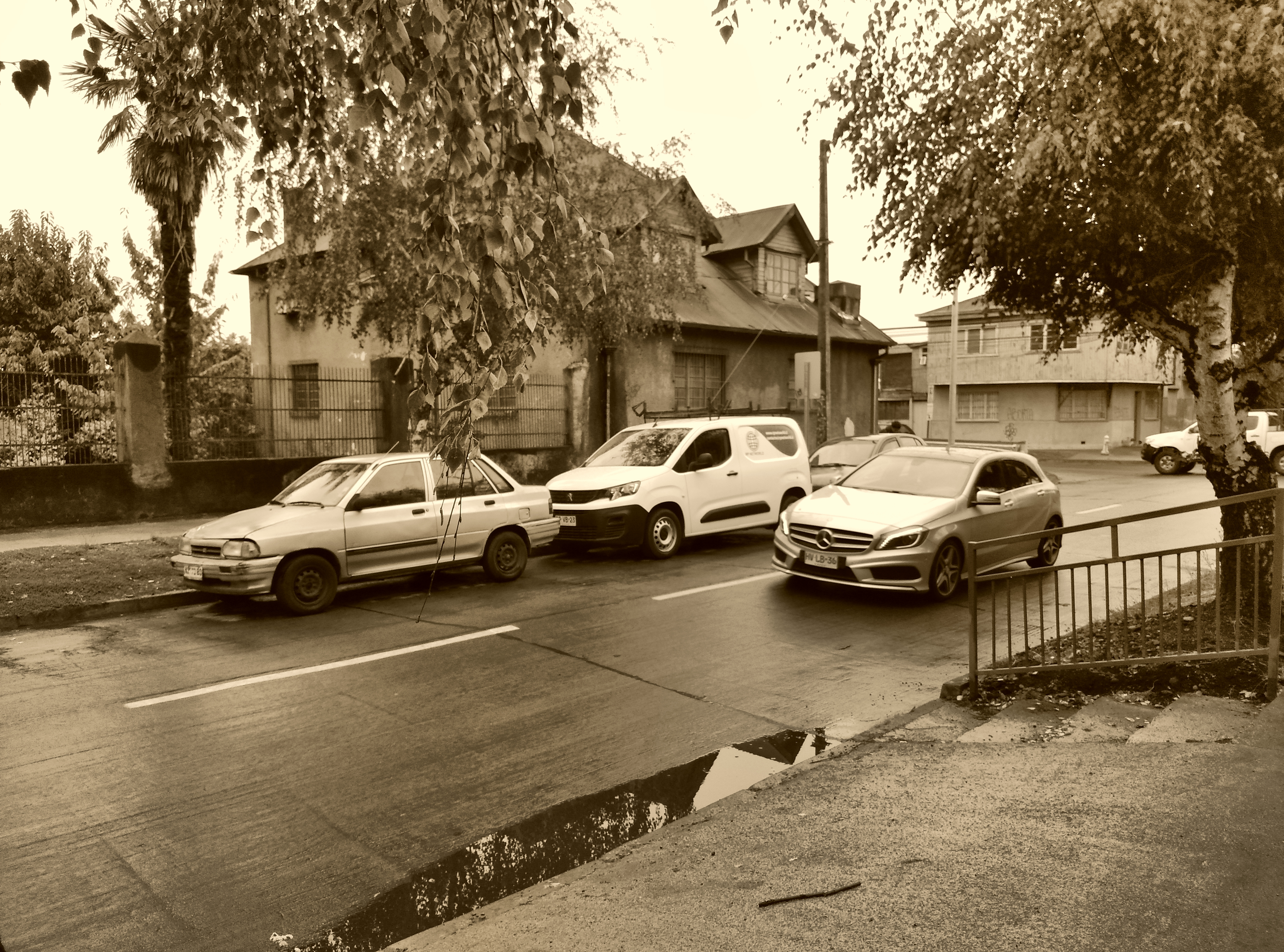
General Cruz Street.

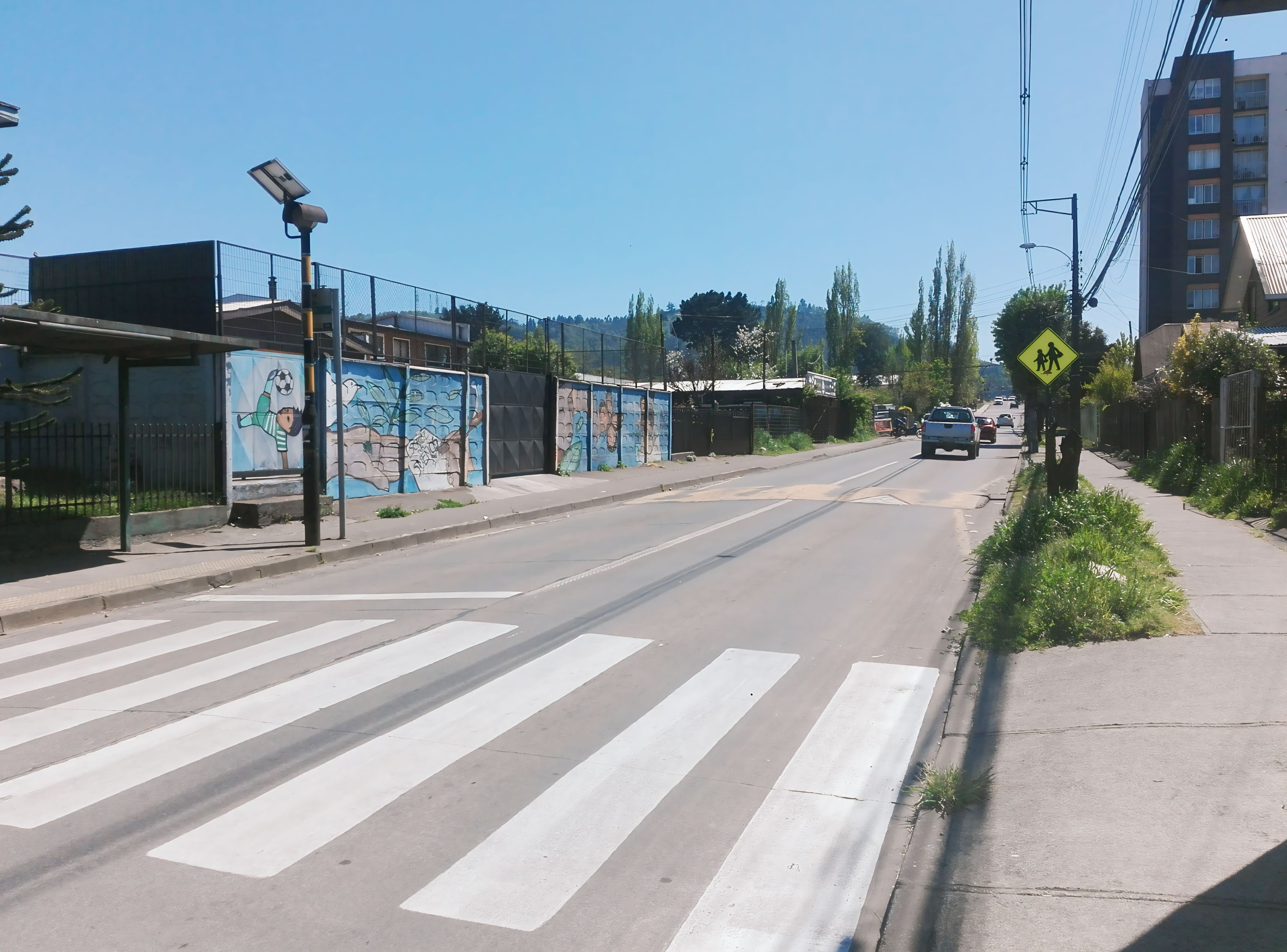
Valparaíso Avenue.

Buses and collective taxis are the most popular modes of mass transit. The bus fare is CLP$150 for students and $450 for adults; the colectivos charge $500 ($650 at night).

La Araucanía Airport is commercial air terminal for Temuco located to the south of the city, near the town of Freire, about 20 minutes south of Temuco.

The railroad connects Temuco with Victoria to the north and points in between.

Temuco does not have a rapid transit rail system.

Long-haul buses run from the Terminal Rodoviario de la Araucania, at the northern approach to town.

Private transport by car is commonly used which causes traffic congestion at peak hours.

The recent proliferation of bike lanes has placed transportation by bicycle as an emerging trend. By 2017, 35 km (22 mi) of bike lanes are expected to be operative.

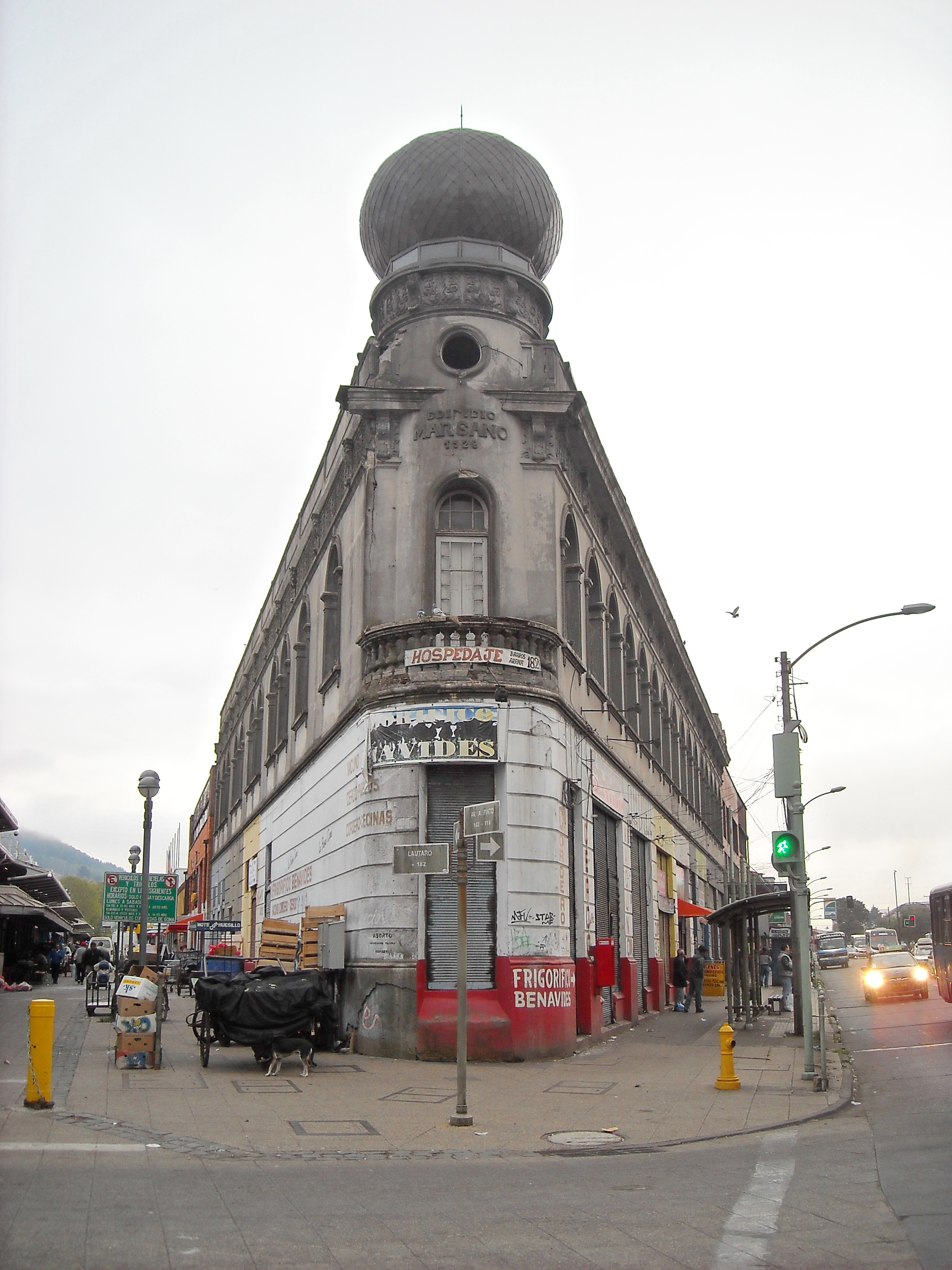
Marsano building beside Feria Pinto

== Important places ==
- Cerro Ñielol

The Ñielol Hill houses the original temperate forest at this latitude in southern Chile as it was before the Spanish people colonised it. Currently, it has the status of natural monument and as such, it is a protected area. It has also a special meaning for the Mapuche people living in the Region, housing near the top a ceremonial area called La Patagua. We can also find a restaurant at the top of the Hill and a viewpoint of the east side of the city and Padre Las Casas, across the river. It is easily accessed by foot or car. The Southern Andean Volcano Observatory has its office there.

- Central market

The central market is one of the best places to get Mapuche crafts. It has a meat market and shops selling woodcrafts, artifacts, wool knits, and similar goods. A fire has recently affected its structure. Reconstruction is planned, but the original market is currently closed.

- Feria Pinto

One of the most traditional places in the city. Fresh fruits and vegetables are sold here in a daily basis. People from the city and from rural nearby towns come here for trade.

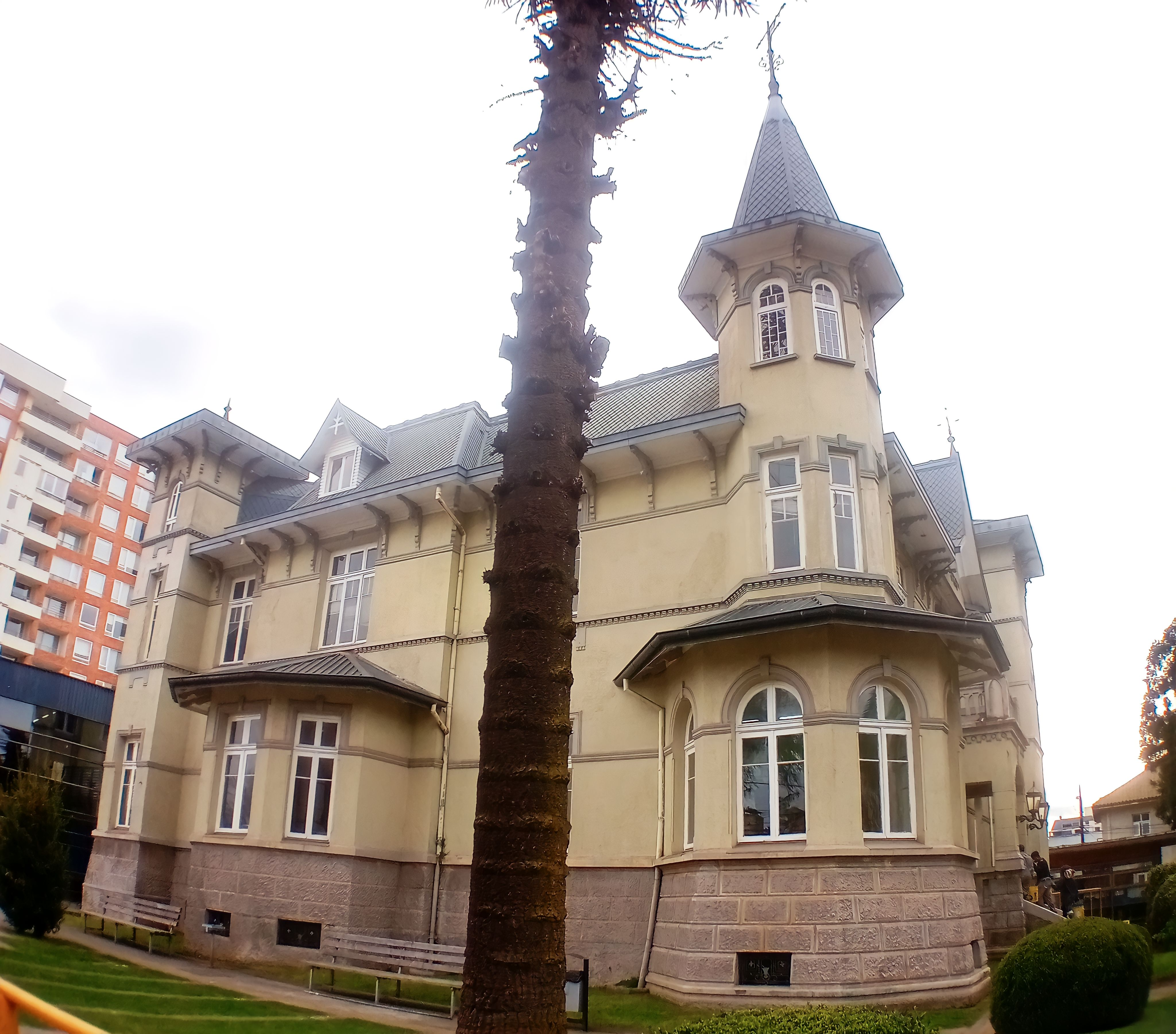
Menchaca Lira Campus of Temuco Catholic University, located in Alemania Avenue.

- Alemania Avenue

Is the principal artery in Temuco. Here we can find The Araucaria Museum building (19th century Chilean style); the Menchaca Lira Campus of Art Building (a Victorian Style building, recently restored); The English Alley, where we can find the Red Cross Building and not long ago a blue house which was dismantled to be rebuilt elsewhere (as a Heritage recovery project by the school of architecture of a known University of Temuco), both Neoclassical styled. Recently, Alemania Av. has become an important commercial centre. Several restaurants, night clubs, pubs, bistros, pharmacies, boutiques, banks, supermarkets and two shopping malls have been opened there. There is also a Casino and a five stars hotel in the same avenue.

- Anibal Pinto Square

The core of Downtown Temuco is the Main Square Anibal Pinto. Temuco's Main Square is the only one in Chile that was not built with a water fountain in its centre; an art gallery was built in 1981 as part of a total renewal. Compared to other main squares of southern Chile, Temuco's looks very modern. It was named one of Chile's most beautiful plazas. It is a tradition, in all creole cities in Chile, that some specific buildings must be in front of the main square; in Temuco, this tradition has been broken. Main Squares are supposed to be surrounded by: a cathedral (which is in front of Temuco's main square, as traditionally), the municipality (which also, is located in front of the square), a theatre (there used to be a film theatre in front of it), a fire station (there is not a fire station in front of the square, as it should), a school (there is no school in front of the main square), and a bank (there are four banks around the main square).
