= Los Vásquez =

Chilean pop rock duo

- Origin: Coyhaique, Chile
- Genres: Onion pop • Rock • Latin ballad
- Years active: 2009–present
- Labels: SdS, Feria Music, Sello Sur
- Members: Enzo Vásquez; Italo Vásquez
- Website: losvasquez.cl

Los Vásquez is a Chilean pop rock duo formed in Coyhaique, Chile. Formed by Italo Vásquez and Enzo Vásquez. The duo became popular in 2010 with the song Tu me haces falta from the album "Contigo pop y cebolla".

== History ==
After training in 2009. In 2010, they dedicated to getting stereos, which composed the letters and sounds of their first album, entitled "Contigo pop y cebolla". In mid 2010 it was released their first single "Tú me haces falta".

In early 2011 they began getting popular in local radio stations. That same year the duo released another single "Miénteme una vez", which was the soundtrack of the soap opera "(novela) Esperanza, which helped expand their popularity. In late 2011, more than 5,000 people came together to view their first concert in the Caupolicán Theatre in Santiago.

During 2012 the duo was listed as Most Listened to Artist of 2012.

In 2013 Los Vasquez launch their second full-album entitled "De sur a norte", selling more than 20,000 copies in just two months.

In 2015, Los Vasquez receive the prize "Most Played Songs" in the Pulsar Awards 2015.

In 2015, the duo give another concert at the Movistar Arena, Santiago to celebrate their 5-year career.

== Discography ==
- Contigo pop y cebolla (2010)
- De sur a norte (2013)
- Recuerdos (2020)
- 10 éxitos inolvidables (2024)

== Singles ==
List of other songs showing year released and album name
| Title | Year | Album |
|---|---|---|
| "Tú Me Haces Falta" | 2010 | Contigo Pop y Cebolla |
| "Miénteme Una Vez" | 2010 | Contigo Pop y Cebolla |
| "Juana María" | 2010 | Contigo Pop y Cebolla |
| "Te Amaré En Clandestinidad" | 2011 | Contigo Pop y Cebolla |
| "Me Enamoré Con Una Mirada" | 2011 | Contigo Pop y Cebolla |
| "Por Amor" | 2011 | Contigo Pop y Cebolla |
| "No Me Quería" | 2011 | Contigo Pop y Cebolla |
| "Voy Por Ti" | 2012 | Contigo Pop y Cebolla |
| "Enamorado" | 2012 | De Sur a Norte |
| "¿Dónde Está Tu Amor?" | 2012 | De Sur a Norte |
| "Vuela Que Vuela" | 2013 | De Sur a Norte |
| "Olvídalo" | 2014 | De Sur a Norte |
| "Mi Amante" | 2014 | De Sur a Norte |
| "Me Vuelvo Loco" | 2014 | De Sur a Norte |
| "Discúlpame" | 2015 | De Sur a Norte |
| "Rosalinda Huaiquipan" | 2016 | De Sur a Norte |
| "Que Más Quisiera Yo" | 2017 | Recuerdos |
| "Chao Chao" | 2017 | Recuerdos |
| "Sigo Pensando en Ti" | 2018 | Recuerdos |
| "Llorarei" | 2018 | Recuerdos |
| "Ay Mi Amor" | 2018 | Recuerdos |
| "Yo Te Voy a Amar" | 2019 | Recuerdos |
| "Mariajuana" (with Santaferia) | 2019 | 10 éxitos inolvidables |
| "Chica del Sur" | 2020 | Recuerdos |
| "Voy a Llorar" | 2020 | Recuerdos |
| "Mi Eterno Amor Secreto" | 2020 | Recuerdos |
| "Te Llamo" | 2021 | Recuerdos |
| "Volveré" | 2021 | No Album |
| "Boquita Hechicera" | 2021 | No Album |
| "Cumbia Cumbia Cumbia" | 2022 | No Album |
| "Quiero Verte" (with Ana Bárbara) | 2023 | 10 éxitos inolvidables |
| "MALAMOR" (with Arte Elegante and Santaferia) | 2023 | No Album |
| "Fe" (tribute to Jorge González) | 2024 | No Album |
| "Si Te Vuelvo a Ver" (with Luis Vega and Rigeo) | 2024 | No Album |
| "Ya No Creo En El Amor" | 2024 | No Album |
| "Fuckyou San Valentín" | 2025 | No Album |
| "Por La Carretera" | 2025 | No Album |
