= Tronic (band) =

Chilean pop punk band

- Tronic in 2012. From left to right: Rodrigo Vizcarra, Raúl Ramos, and Gustavo Labrín.

Background information
- Origin: Santiago, Chile
- Genres: Pop punk; rock
- Years active: 2001–2002; 2003–present
- Labels: Feria Music; GmbH; Pelúa Records
- Members: Gustavo "Chavín" Labrín; Rodrigo "Rigo" Vizcarra; Ciro Longa; Ignacio "Nacho" Ibarra; Gabriel "Gabo" Aliaga
- Past members: Carlos Lama; Daniel Palma; Francisco Salas; Raúl "Baktrik" Ramos; Rodrigo "Levi" Stambuk; Felipe "Abuelo" Blaser

Tronic (commonly styled in all caps as TRONIC) is a Chilean pop punk band formed in 2001 in Santiago, Chile, by musicians Gustavo "Chavín" Labrín and Rodrigo "Rigo" Vizcarra. Known for their mascot "Ciro Longa", a fictional character who acts as the band's virtual drummer, the band achieved commercial success in Chile and Latin America throughout the 2000s following the release of their first two studio albums, Ke patine la risa (2003) and Evoluciona (2005), which spawned various singles with extensive radio airplay.

Over the course of their career, they have released nine studio albums, performed at festivals such as Lollapalooza Chile, and toured extensively throughout Chile and Latin America.

== History ==
=== Formation and Ke patine la risa (2001–2004) ===
Tronic was formed in 2001 by guitarist and vocalist Gustavo Labrín (then a member of Glup!) and Rodrigo Vizcarra (touring guitarist for Supernova), both originally from San Carlos, Chile. That same year, they recorded their first demo with contributions from bassist Rodrigo "Levi" Stambuk (also of Glup!) and guitarist Felipe "Abuelo" Blaser. The following year, they recorded a debut studio album, however, the material was lost due to a computer failure in their studio, which led the band into an indefinite hiatus. During this downtime, Vizcarra joined Glup! as a guitarist, while Labrín co-founded Gufi alongside Tim Pichetti and Emanuel "Chiwawa" Finlayson. Following Finlayson's murder in April 2003, Labrín left Gufi and resumed collaborating with Vizcarra.

In early 2003, the duo restarted recording sessions for their debut release without Stambuk or Blaser, soon after adding Carlos Lama on rhythm guitar. Lacking the budget for an acoustic drum kit, they programmed all drum patterns digitally on a computer. While creating artwork for an early promotional flyer, Labrín sketched a character on a paper napkin; the drawing was well received by the public, prompting the group to introduce it as their mascot and official "drummer", named Ciro Longa.

In June 2003, Tronic released their debut album, Ke patine la risa. The album was produced entirely without physical amplifiers, with instruments connected directly into a computer's sound card. It sold over 10,000 units in Chile and included popular tracks such as "Combo final", "Malos amigos", "Otra vez", and "Tele culiá", receiving extensive airplay on local radio stations. In 2004, the band performed in Buenos Aires, Argentina alongside Argentine alternative rock group El Otro Yo.

=== Evoluciona and acoustic drummer period (2005–2009) ===
In 2005, they released their second album, Evoluciona, featuring a heavier guitar sound and lyrics focused on social issues in songs such as "Misis Guiñi", and "Prendan la radio". Addressing public criticism over the lack of a live drummer at their concerts, they brought in Daniel Palma (formerly of Chilean group Melvin Crema). With this lineup, they opened for the American band Good Charlotte, alongside Chilean bands Los Mox! and Gufi at Estadio Nacional's velodrome on November 30, 2005.

In early 2007, Francisco Salas replaced Palma on drums. That same year, the group founded their own independent label, Pelúa Records, through which they released Ligas mayores (2007). In 2008, they followed with Es la hora de limpiar la casa; the animated music video for its lead single, "Veinte por ciento", reached number one on the MTV Latin America video charts, sparking their first live dates in Mexico and Colombia. Following the album's release, Salas and Carlos Lama left the band, and Raúl "Baktrik" Ramos (of Chilean group NoCiudadanos) joined on bass, with Vizcarra taking on shared vocal and guitar duties. In 2009, this lineup performed at the second edition of the La Cumbre del Rock Chileno festival at the Club Hípico de Santiago.

=== Ciro Longa's return, move to Mexico, and subsequent years (2010–present) ===
In 2010 Tronic released Contra la corriente, where they returned to Ciro Longa's programmed drums, noting that with acoustic drummers they lost their characteristic sound. Following the magnitude 8.8 earthquake on February 27, 2010 and the subsequent cancellation of concerts, the members sold all their gear and relocated to Mexico City.

Based in Mexico, the band released Vale otro (2012) and Alerta de aplicación (2015) through their label Pelúa Records. In 2017, Ramos left the band, leaving Tronic as a duo composed of Labrín and Vizcarra along with Ciro Longa, later adding bassist Ignacio "Nacho" Ibarra and guitarist Gabriel "Gabo" Aliaga as touring musicians. In October 2020, they released their eighth studio record, With Música Is Mejor.

In March 2024, Tronic performed at Lollapalooza Chile. In 2025, they released the album Traspaso generacional, which featured a punk rock rendition of "Trátame suavemente", a song written by Daniel Melero and popularized by Argentine band Soda Stereo. In 2026, they performed at the REC Festival in Concepción, Chile, as part of a national tour commemorating their 25-year career.

== Band members ==
=== Current members ===
- Gustavo "Chavín" Labrín – lead vocals, guitar (2001–2002, 2003–present)
- Rodrigo "Rigo" Vizcarra – drums (2001–2002), lead vocals, bass (2003–2008), lead vocals, guitar (2008–present)
- Ciro Longa – virtual drums, sequencing (2003–2005, 2008–present)
- Ignacio "Nacho" Ibarra – bass, backing vocals (2017–present; touring/session)
- Gabriel "Gabo" Aliaga – guitar, backing vocals (2023–present; touring/session)

=== Former members ===
- Carlos Lama – guitar (2003–2008)
- Daniel Palma – drums (2005–2007)
- Francisco Salas – drums (2007–2008)
- Raúl "Baktrik" Ramos – bass (2008–2017)
- Rodrigo "Levi" Stambuk – bass (2001–2002)
- Felipe "Abuelo" Blaser – guitar (2001–2002)

== Discography ==
=== Studio albums ===
- Ke patine la risa (2003)
- Evoluciona (2005)
- Ligas mayores (2007)
- Es la hora de limpiar la casa (2008)
- Contra la corriente (2010)
- Vale otro (2012)
- Alerta de aplicación (2015)
- With Música Is Mejor (2020)
- Traspaso generacional (2025)
