= Feria Mix =

Music retailer in Chile

- Formerly: Feria del Disco
- Type: Private
- Industry: Retail
- Genre: Music retailer
- Founded: 1956
- Founder: Marta González Marnich
- Defunct: 2014
- Headquarters: Santiago, Chile
- Products: Music; film; television; merchandise; video games; books
- Parent: Establecimientos de la Fuente
- Subsidiaries: Feria Ticket; Feria Music

Feria Mix (previously known as Feria del Disco) was a major Chilean music and entertainment retailer. Founded in 1956, it operated for over five decades as one of the country's most iconic music and media retailers before filing for bankruptcy in January 2014, leading to the closure of all its stores.

== History ==
=== Origins ===
In 1956, Marta González Marnich, then 24 years old, took the first steps toward establishing what would become Feria del Disco by setting up a small record sales counter inside the appliance store owned by her husband, Humberto de la Fuente, in downtown Santiago. Encouraged by the initial success of the initiative, the De la Fuente-González couple soon expanded their venture beyond the appliance store, opening two dedicated music shops: Rochelle, located on Monjitas street, and Rapsodia, on San Antonio street. These stores marked the couple's transition into full-time music retailing.

The first dedicated Feria del Disco store at Ahumada 286 in downtown Santiago opened in December 1966, following the relocation of the Rapsodia store. The sore was initially focusing on the sale of vinyl records and music products. For much of its early history, it remained a prominent destination for music enthusiasts. The company showed resilience through industry challenges, including vinyl shortages in the 1970s, cassette piracy in the 1980s, CD piracy from the late 1990s onward, including global economic crises such as those in the Middle East, Southeast Asia during the 1990s.

The chain expanded from its Santiago base to regions, beginning with Mall El Trébol in Concepción (September 1999), followed by stores in La Serena, Viña del Mar, Rancagua, Antofagasta, and others throughout the 2000s, reaching as far as Punta Arenas and Osorno. By the late 2000s, it operated 45 stores nationwide. Key infrastructure included the Central Distribution and Logistics Center (the company's main warehouse located at Riquelme 825), opened in November 1995, which provided seven times more space than its predecessor, enabling catalog expansion and supporting new store openings.

=== Diversification and business reorganization ===
In 2001, facing serious challenges from widespread piracy in Chile and advancing digital formats (such as music downloading), Feria del Disco began diversifying its offerings, deeming this a situation of "reinventing themselves or die". The company underwent a major strategic pivot, expanding its product range to include books, video games, DVDs, and other entertainment media, diversifying beyond its traditional music focus. Under the leadership of Hernán González Garay, who became the company's CEO in October 2001 (coinciding with its 45th anniversary), the company modernized significantly, the company also transitioned from counter service to self-service, remodeling stores (starting with the stores at shopping malls Plaza Vespucio and Alto Las Condes in early 2002, followed by Ahumada 286 in April 2003), and ongoing expansion. In September 2006, the chain rebranded to Feria Mix to reflect the broader "mixed" entertainment focus.

In 2004, they launched Feria Ticket, their own system for ticket sales for concerts and events, while their own record label, Feria Music was announced in July 2005, following a merger with the label La Oreja in February 2007.

The company obtained the ISO 9001:2000 certification by late 2007, becoming one of Chile's 500 companies to do so.

In 2009, the company recorded significant financial losses, which exceeded $1.3 billion Chilean pesos (approximately US$2.5 million). This led to the closure of some smaller locations in 2009 and relocations or expansions in others, such as a move to a bigger space in Valdivia's Mall Plaza Los Ríos, planned enlargements in Plaza Norte, Calama, and Arauco Maipú, and upcoming openings in Portal Ñuñoa and Arauco San Antonio. The company also evaluated opportunities in major projects like Costanera Center and provincial shopping malls.

In 2010, music accounted for only 20% of the company's total revenues, while books contributed 25%—the largest single category—followed by video games and other audiovisual products. Annual sales reached approximately US$60 million in the prior year, with projections for similar revenue but improved profitability through cost efficiencies and a leaner expense structure comparable to 2005 levels.

In 2013, the chain's debt had surpassed $2.5 billion Chilean pesos (approximately US$5 million), contributing to total liabilities of $7.6 billion pesos (approximately US$15 million) owed to suppliers, banks, and other creditors.

=== Bankruptcy and closure ===
On January 21, 2014, book publisher Ediciones B filed a lawsuit with the 3rd Civil Court of Santiago over unpaid invoices. The following week, Feria Mix convened meetings with several suppliers to explain its situation and promised to file a judicial settlement agreement before January 31. No such filing occurred, and on January 28, 2014, stores—including the flagship location on Paseo Ahumada in downtown Santiago—abruptly shut down, surprising customers and suppliers.

On January 29, 2014, Feria Mix and its parent company, Establecimientos de la Fuente, announced they had filed for bankruptcy. The decision affected the main retail chain as well as its subsidiaries Feria Ticket and Feria Music. Rodrigo de la Fuente, the then CEO of Establecimientos de la Fuente, stated in an official statement that after thorough analysis of the company's finances, continuing operations had become impossible due to unviable monthly financial costs. Sources close to the company reported accumulated losses of approximately CL$15,000 million (around US$27.3 million at the time).

=== Aftermath ===
The closure of Feria Mix marked the end of more than 57 years of continuous operation and removed one of Chile's best-known physical retail brands in the music and entertainment sector.

Following bankruptcy, more than 160,000 outstanding merchandise (vinyl records, CDs, books, and other items) were auctioned on November 4, 2014.

== Cultural impact ==
Feria del Disco played a central role in the Chilean music industry, beginning with the Nueva Ola period up to the late 2000s. In particular, the store located at Paseo Ahumada became a cultural meeting point, hosting numerous in-store appearances, autograph signings, and fan interactions. The tradition began with Chilean artist José Alfredo Fuentes in the 1960s, and in the following decades, it became customary for local and visiting international artists to stop by this location. Notable events include when the band Los Jocker's performed for 54 hours nonstop at the store in 1968, setting a Guinness World Record at the time, the announcement of Los Prisioneros' return in their original line-up in 2000, and the performance of Spanish group Camela on the store's balcony, which gathered over 20,000 people on the street.

In 2025, a survey conducted by Cadem showed that Feria del Disco was one of the brands Chileans most wanted to see coming back.
