= Carolina Molina =

Chilean singer (born 1981)

- Born: Quillota, Chile
- Occupation: Singer
- Years active: 2002–present
- Label: Feria Music
- Website: www.carolinamolinao.com (in Spanish)

María Carolina Figueroa Molina (born May 28, 1981) better known as La Rancherita, is a Chilean singer.

== Discography ==
- Prueba de Fuego (2001)
- Ranxerita (2008)
- Muñeca (2011)

== Filmography ==
- Rojo fama contrafama (2003) – Participant/Singer
- Mekano (2006) – Participant/Singer
- Fiebre de Baile (2009) – Participant/Dancer
- Año 0 (2011) – Herself/Participant
- Fiebre de Baile 4 (2011) – Participant/Dancer
- Psíquicos (2012) – Herself (Guest)
