= Daniela Aleuy =

Chilean singer and songwriter

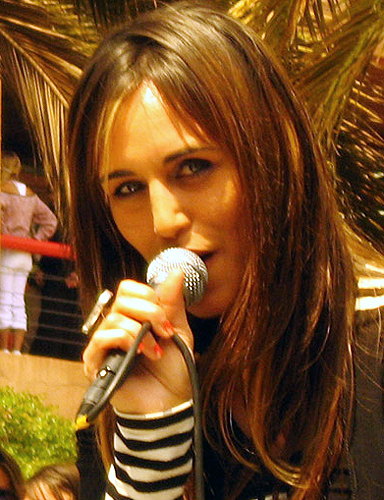
- Daniela Aleuy (2006)

Background information
- Born: Daniela Paz Aleuy Young; 1976 (age 49–50); Coyhaique, Chile
- Genres: Pop, Latin
- Occupations: Singer, songwriter
- Years active: 2001–2011
- Labels: Warner Music, La Oreja, Independiente

Daniela Paz Aleuy Young (born 1976, Coyhaique) is a Chilean former singer and songwriter.

== Biography ==
Aleuy Young is an artist from Coyhaique, capital of the Aysén Region. She is notable for her role in "Pase lo que pase" on Televisión Nacional de Chile and her 2001 performance at the Viña del Mar International Song Festival. She sang the theme song for Kinnikuman, Pokémon 2000 - The Movie, Tenchi Universe (TV), You're Under Arrest (OAV), and You're Under Arrest (TV). Her 2011 album, EnCerio, was composed, produced and recorded in Mexico.

== Discography ==
- 2001, Así soy yo (Warner Music)
- 2006, Creer (La Oreja)
- 2011, EnCerio (Independiente)
