= Santa Feria =

Santaferia
- Also known as: Santaferia
- Origin: Chile
- Genres: cumbia
- Years active: 2008–present
- Website: www.santaferia.cl

Santaferia is a musical group from Chile. They play an eclectic style of new Chilean cumbia that they call cumbia casera ("house cumbia"), combining elements of Argentinian cumbia villera ("ghetto cumbia"), ska, reggae, and other Latin music traditions. The group was formed in 2008, and includes ten members, playing guitar, bass, keyboards, brass instruments, and several types of percussion, in addition to vocals. They have released two albums, Le traigo cumbia ("I bring you cumbia") in 2011, and Lo que va a pasar ("What is going to happen") in 2013. Several of their songs have become hits in Chile, most notably Sakate Uno.

== Members ==
Logo

- Alonso "Pollo" González: lead vocals
- Nicolas "Schala" Schlein: timbau
- Ricardo "Richi" Fuentes: güiro and percussion
- Rodrigo "Cogollo" González: bass and chorus
- Mauricio Lira: guitar and chorus
- Ariel Carrasco: keyboards, charango, and chorus
- Francisco Vílchez: trombone
- Diego Muñoz: baritone sax
- Ignacio Rossello: trumpet
- Gonzalo Jara: congas and timbau

== Discography ==
- Le traigo cumbia (2011)

Tracks:

1. El inodoro
2. Le traigo cumbia
3. Dulcesito
4. Con - A - Ce
5. Amor sin fronteras
6. Sono el reloj
7. Negra cumbiambera (video)
8. Sakate 1 (video)
9. Asociegate cachorra
10. Mañosa (video)
11. Don Satan
12. Corre que te pillo
13. Roto y borracho
- Lo que va a pasar (2013)

Tracks:

1. Locura y pasion (con Joe Vasconcellos) (video)
2. Las cumbieras y los cumbieros
3. Lo que va a pasar
4. Hachazo permanente
5. Quien es
6. No eh sacado tu (Interludio Violeta)
7. La espina (video)
8. Brindemos por la cumbia
9. Esa guachita (Esa pibita)
10. Sacate otro
11. Turbo brass

"astuta" single 2015 http://www.portaldisc.com/santaferia (free download)
