= Checho Hirane =

Chilean politician (born 1955)

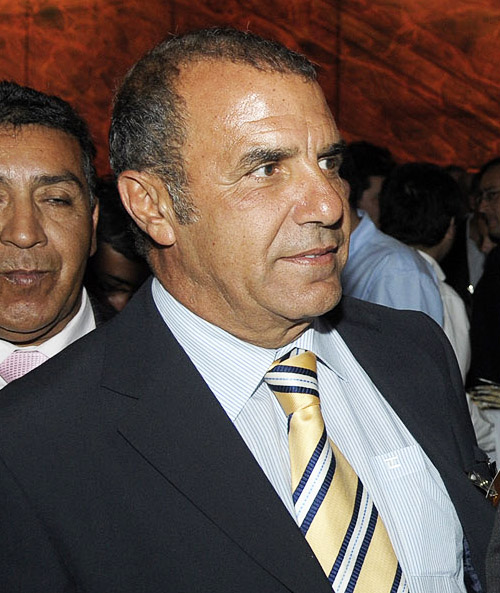

Personal details
- Born: 27 January 1955 (age 71) Santiago, Chile
- Spouse: Ana María Hirmas
- Children: Four
- Education: Bernardo O'Higgins Military Academy; Pontifical Catholic University of Chile
- Occupation: Politician; Television personality

Sergio José Hirane Sarkis (born 27 January 1955) is a Chilean humorist, economist, and political commentator known for his work in television, radio, and print media.

Initially gaining popularity as a stand-up comedian during the 1980s and 1990s, Hirane became recognized for his satirical style and commentary on national affairs, often blending humor with pointed sociopolitical critique. In the 2000s, Hirane transitioned into a prominent media personality and conservative commentator, hosting various radio and television programs where he voiced strong opinions on Chilean politics, economics, and society.

A vocal critic of left-wing populism and the 2019–2020 Chilean protests, he has positioned himself as a defender of market-oriented policies and traditional values. His dual background in economics and entertainment has made him a polarizing figure in Chile’s public discourse.

== Biography ==
Nicknamed Checho by his friends from an early age, he began performing at school festivals as a child. At the age of seven, he won a singing competition organized by the children's television program Colorín Colorado, which aired on the Pontifical Catholic University of Chile's TV network, Canal 13.

He gradually developed a clear artistic vocation through leading roles in school theater productions. At the age of 15, he entered the Libertador Bernardo O'Higgins Military Academy, where he continued to nurture his artistic side by participating in music and theater circles. During his time at the military academy, he served under the direct command of Miguel Krassnoff, who was his supervising officer.

In 1974, he enrolled at the Pontifical Catholic University of Chile (PUC), where he graduated with a degree in business and economics. From his early university days, he became a prominent host and organizer of various artistic events, such as festivals and university weeks.

At the age of 19, he became the youngest director of the renowned Clásicos Universitarios, large-scale performances held in conjunction with the football rivalry between Universidad Católica and Universidad de Chile, featuring more than a thousand performers on stage.

In 1977, at the age of 22, he married Ana María Hirmas Chehade. The couple has four children.

== Career ==
Hirane began his professional career as a comedian in 1983, performing in a café-concert with moderate public success. This caught the attention of the press, as he attracted audiences despite not yet having appeared on television. He later co-founded Bar Romeo alongside singer Miguelo.

In 1984, he performed as a comedian at the Viña del Mar International Song Festival. In 1990, he joined Canal 13 to perform comedy routines on the late-night show Una vez más, hosted by Raúl Matas. From 1991 to 1996, he was a panelist on the family show Video Loco, also broadcast by Canal 13. In 1997, he moved to Megavisión, where he participated in programs such as Domingo a domingo and Videos y Penitencias. From 2002 to 2006, he hosted Golf Tour, aired on ABT Televisión and later on TVO and Más Canal.

Since 2002, he has hosted the radio program Conectados en Agricultura on Radio Agricultura, where he developed a role as a political commentator aligned with the political right. In 2004 and 2005, he appeared on En Portada alongside Marcela Vacarezza. On La Red, he hosted Con el pie derecho (replacing Mauricio Israel) and the talk show Nunca es tarde in 2009.

In October 2020, Hirane launched his political talk show Café cargado on La Red. Nevertheless, the show was renewed in 2021. In January 2022, La Red abruptly ended the season of Café cargado following controversial statements Hirane made on Radio Agricultura, where he urged the business community to “place every possible obstacle” in the way of President Gabriel Boric’s government.
