= Álvaro Véliz =

Chilean singer

Álvaro Véliz (born February 9, 1972 in Santiago), is a Chilean singer. He represented Chile at the 2006 Viña del Mar International Song Festival.
