= Los Prisioneros discography =

- Studio albums: 6
- Live albums: 5
- Compilation albums: 6
- Singles: 34
- Music videos: 13
- DVDs: 4

This list is a discography of Los Prisioneros.

== Studio albums ==
- La voz de los '80 (1984)
- Pateando piedras (1986)
- La cultura de la basura (1987)
- Corazones (1990)
- Los Prisioneros (2003)
- Manzana (2004)

== Live albums ==
- En Vivo.. Parque la Bandera (1988)
- El Caset Pirata (2000)
- Estadio Nacional (2001)
- En Vivo (2002)

== Compilations ==
- Los Prisioneros (1988)
- Grandes éxitos (1991)
- Ni Por La Razón, Ni Por La Fuerza (1996)
- Antología, su historia y sus éxitos (2001)
- Músicos, poetas y locos (2003)

== Specials ==
- La cultura de la basura (1988)(Edición latinoamericana)
- Los Prisioneros en las Raras Tocatas Nuevas de la Rock & Pop (2003)

== Tribute ==
- Tributo a Los Prisioneros (2000)

== Singles ==
- 1984 - La voz de los '80
- 1985 - Sexo
- 1985 - Latinoamérica es un pueblo al sur de Estados Unidos
- 1985 - ¿Quién mató a Marilyn?
- 1985 - Paramar
- 1985 - Nunca quedas mal con nadie
- 1985 - Mentalidad televisiva
- 1986 - Muevan las industrias
- 1986 - El baile de los que sobran
- 1986 - Por qué no se van
- 1986 - Por qué los ricos
- 1986 - Independencia cultural
- 1986 - Estar solo
- 1986 - Quieren dinero
- 1986 - Exijo ser un héroe
- 1987 - Maldito sudaca
- 1988 - Lo estamos pasando muy bien
- 1988 - Que no destrocen tu vida
- 1988 - Pa pa pa
- 1988 - Él es mi ídolo
- 1988 - We are sudamerican rockers
- 1990 - Tren al sur
- 1990 - Estrechez de corazón
- 1990 - Corazones rojos
- 1990 - Con suavidad
- 1991 - Amiga mía
- 2001 - Las sierras eléctricas
- 2003 - Ultraderecha
- 2003 - San Miguel
- 2003 - Concepción
- 2003 - Canción del trabajo
- 2004 - El muro
- 2004 - Manzana
- 2004 - Eres mi hogar

== DVD ==
- 1992 - Grandes éxitos (VHS)
  music videos, documentaries and extras
- 2002 - Antología, su historia y sus éxitos
  music videos, documentaries and extras
- 2002 - Lo estamos pasando muy bien
  Live concert at the National Stadium
