= List of best-selling albums in Chile =

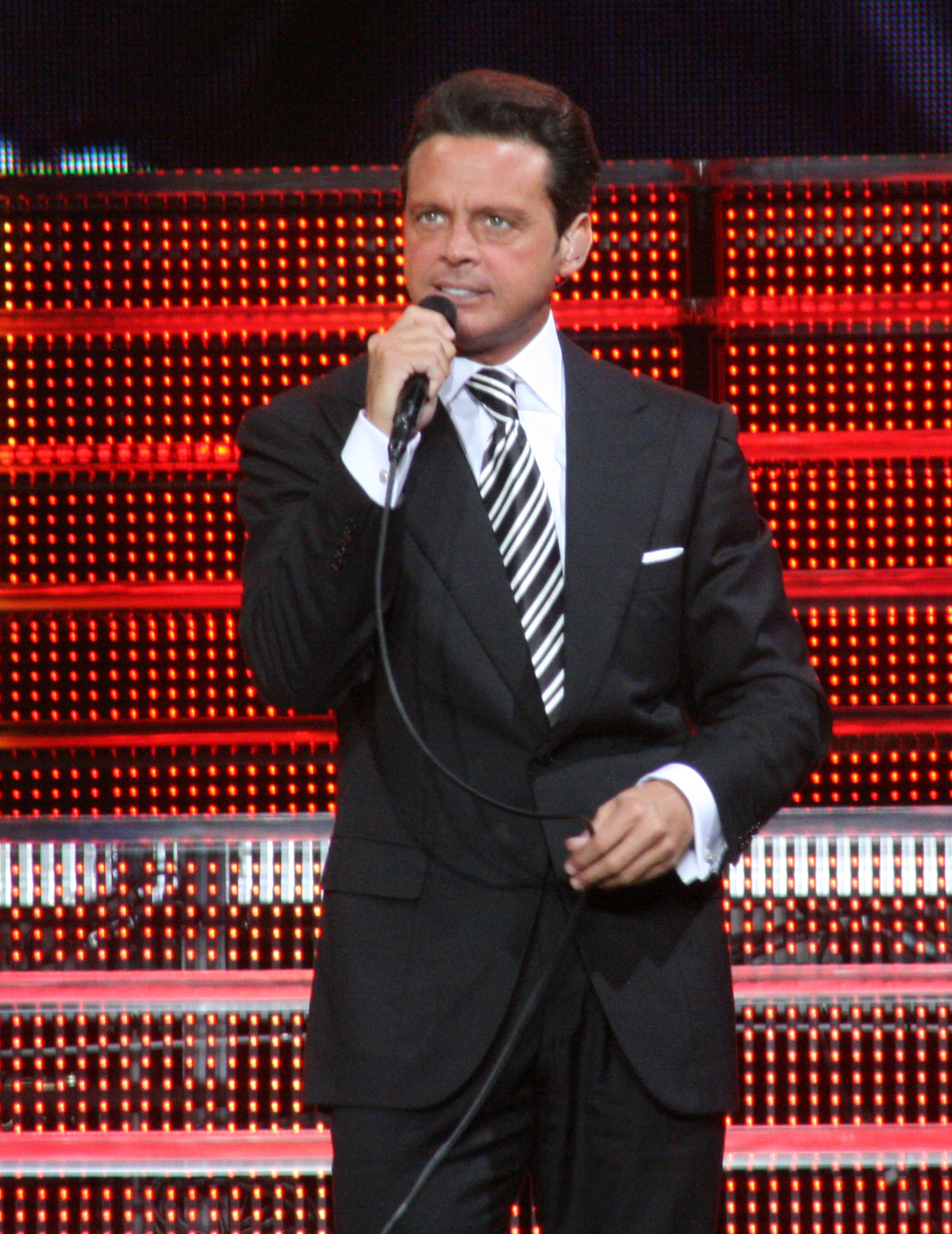
Luis Miguel is both the best-selling artist in Chile and has the most entries, with 9 albums of sales over 100,000 units

The following is an independently-determined list of best-selling albums in Chile. Some of these figures are reported by national newspapers such as El Mercurio and La Tercera, forwarded by entities that includes Feria del Disco and Musimundo (then Chile's largest retailers) or music associations like Asociación de Productores Fonográficos de Chile (APF or IFPI Chile), Chile's record-industry trade group that compiled sales from five multionational labels that make up APF (Sony, BMG, EMI, Warner and Polygram Chile).

Chilean music market rose steadily in the mid-1990s, with sales of more than 7.5 million records in 1996. Record sales peaked in 1997, when 9 million units were sold. The music market have seen a decrease in their tallies figures. Despite this, the country have been included as one of the biggest 50th music markets during multiple reports by the International Federation of the Phonographic Industry (IFPI). Billboard found that the consumption of music by Chileans have been focused in international artists (Latino and non-Latinos artists), and that their local music represented only 20% share in 1996. Qué Pasa explained in 2001 that international artists have been the priority by record labels, and at the sum of the year, yearly national best-selling albums have had an average of only 12% from their domestic acts according to La Segunda in 2010.

Luis Miguel's Romance is believed to be the best-selling album in Chile, with tracked sales of 500,000 units. In addition, Luis Miguel is the artist with the most entries, with at least 9 albums, followed by Los Prisioneros (3) and Maná (3), as well. Five of those Miguel's albums attained sales of over 200,000 copies sold – the most by any other act with those figures.

However, the best-selling record of Chilean music history is "El Rock del Mundial" by The Ramblers, with estimated sales of 600,000 units.

== Keys ==
‡	Indicates a Chilean artist

== All-time best-selling albums ==
Over 100,000 units
Rel. year	Artist	Album	Claimed sales	Ref.
1991	Luis Miguel	Romance	500,000	
1997	Luis Miguel	Romances	433,000	
1994	Luis Miguel	Segundo Romance	325,000	
1990	Juan Luis Guerra	Bachata Rosa	300,000	
1995	Luis Miguel	El Concierto	250,000	
1990	Xuxa	Xuxa	250,000	
1995	Estúpido Cupido	Estúpido Cupido	225,000	
1991	Ana Gabriel	Mi México	200,000	
1992	Maná	¿Dónde Jugarán los Niños?	200,000	
1993	Luis Miguel	Aries	200,000	
1990	Los Prisioneros	Corazones	180,000	
1990	Juan Gabriel	Juan Gabriel en el Palacio de Bellas Artes	175,000	
1993	Illapu	En estos días	175,000	
1996	Juan Gabriel	Bienvenido a Chile	175,000	
1993	Eros Ramazzotti	Tutte Storie	160,000	
2003	María José Quintanilla	México Lindo y Querido	160,000	
1996	Luis Miguel	Nada Es Igual...	150,000	
1993	Phil Collins	Both Sides	150,000	
1996	Sucupira	Sucupira	150,000	
1999	Joe Vasconcellos	Vivo	150,000	
2003	31 Minutos	31 Minutos	140,000	
2003	Christell	Christell	126,000	
1994	Ricardo Arjona	Historias	125,000	
1995	Los Tres	MTV Unplugged	125,000	
1996	Ella baila sola	Ella baila sola (album)	120,000	
1997	Andrea Bocelli	Romanza	120,000	
1998	Ella baila sola	E.B.S.	120,000	
1988	Luis Miguel	Busca una Mujer	120,000	
1990	Luis Miguel	20 Años	117,000	
1995	Maná	Cuando los Ángeles Lloran	117,000	
1984	Los Prisioneros	La voz de los '80	100,000	
1986	Los Prisioneros	Pateando piedras	100,000	
1988	Myriam Hernández	Myriam Hernández	100,000	
1989	Sexual Democracia	Buscando chilenos	100,000	
1991	La Ley	Doble Opuesto	100,000	
1992	Whitney Houston / Various Artists	The Bodyguard	100,000	
1991	Michael Jackson	Dangerous	100,000	
1997	Alejandro Sanz	Más	100,000	
1998	Shakira	¿Dónde Están los Ladrones?	100,000	
1999	Luis Miguel	Amarte Es un Placer	100,000	
2003	Axé Bahia	Tudo bem	100,000	
2006	La Oreja de Van Gogh	Guapa	100,000	
2008	Américo	A Morir	100,000	
2010	Los Vásquez	Contigo pop y cebolla	100,000	

== Best-selling albums by year ==
Year	Album	Artist	Reported sales	Ref.
1990	Xuxa	Xuxa	100,000	
1996	MTV Unplugged	Los Tres	150,000	
1999	Valses	Andre Rieu	92,000	
2001	Chocolate	Chocolate	—N/a	
2003	México Lindo y Querido	María José Quintanilla	160,000	
2004	Vuelo	Kudai	60,000	
2005	Vuelo	Kudai	42,000	
2008	En Tu Cuarto	La Noche	50,000	
2009	A Morir	Américo	40,000	
2010	A Morir	Américo	—N/a	
2011	Contigo pop y cebolla	Los Vásquez	20,000	
2012	21	Adele	22,000	
2013	Midnight Memories	One Direction	40,000	

== Best-selling international artists in Chile ==
In 1999, Luis Miguel was awarded with 3 special Diamond Award ("Disco de Diamante" from Spanish) recognizing "exceptional sales" of 1,750,000 units across the nation during his career. This award was later presented to Ricardo Arjona in 2006, when his total record sales reached the one million mark in the country. In comparison, Américo became the first Chilean artist to receive this recognition (2010) but lacked of support from IFPI Chile. While his record label, Feria Music (a label that shared 30% of the national sales value) awarded him as their best-selling artist, Karina Ruiz from IFPI Chile said that award from Feria Music isn't an official award from the industry. The next artist with sales reported close to the one million mark, is Juan Gabriel whom reached the sum of 700,000 in 1999, and 950,000 units as of 2010. Luis Miguel remains the best-selling artist in Chile, with sales of over 2.5 million units as of 2012, a sum that could be easily 3 million copies according to La Tercera because his first records don't have scanned sales report.

Over 100,000 in sales
Artist	Sales (as of date)	Image
Luis Miguel	2,500,000 (as of 2012)	
Ricardo Arjona	1,000,000 (as of 2006)	
Juan Gabriel	950,000 (as of 2010)	
Shakira	500,000 (Physical sales)	
Ana Gabriel	400,000 (as of 1994)	
Madonna	400,000 (as of 2012)	
Nana Mouskouri	300,000 (as of 1994)	
Xuxa	250,000 (as of 1991)	
U2	250,000 (as of 1994)	
Chayanne	250,000 (as of 2012)	
Gloria Estefan	249,000 (as of 2026)	
Metallica	200,000 (as of 1994)	
Laura Pausini	200,000 (as of 2009)	
Sting	150,000 (as of 1994)	
RBD	120,000 (as of 2008)	

== See also ==
- Music of Chile
- List of best-selling albums
  - List of best-selling albums by country
- List of best-selling singles by country§Chile
