= Los Miserables (band) =

Chilean punk rock band

- Origin: Santiago, Chile
- Genres: Punk rock, hardcore, ska, alternative rock
- Years active: 1990–present
- Labels: Liberación, Sello Alerce, Bizarro/Warner Music, La Oreja
- Members: Claudio García; Óscar Silva; Patricio Silva; Juan Contreras; Rodrigo Arias; Marcelo Aravena
- Past members: Alvaro Prieto; Rodrigo Silva; Francisco Silva
- Website: www.losmiserables.cl

Los Miserables is a Chilean punk rock band formed in the early 1990s shortly after the demise of the military regime of Augusto Pinochet. The band is known for its songs charged with strong left-wing political ideas and anti-establishment commentary. The band has clearly presented itself as activist in its work with major participation in political events, international charity concerts, human rights events, and volunteer work in impoverished Chilean communities. The band has modeled itself in some ways after the famed Chilean band Los Prisioneros, who left a void after their initial break-up in 1990.

The band achieved major success in Chile in the mid-1990s, and is well known in Argentina, Colombia, and Mexico. They have recorded 8 albums, including three live albums, and received gold records in Chile. The band has also contributed songs to major Chilean movie soundtracks including the main song for the Chilean film El Leyton, a film by famed director Gonzalo Justiniano, of the films B-Happy (2003), Amnesia (1994), and Caluga o Menta (1990). They have also performed in tribute albums to Víctor Jara, Violeta Parra, and Los Prisioneros.

== Members ==
Current members

- Claudio García – lead vocals, drums (since 1990)
- Óscar Silva – bass, rhythm guitar, vocals (since 1990)
- Patricio Silva – lead guitar, bass (since 1990)
- Juan Francisco Contreras – drums (since 2009)
- Marcelo Aravena – rhythm guitar (since 2011)

Former members

- Alvaro Prieto – lead vocals (1995-1999)
- Rodrigo Silva – drums (1998-2004)
- Francisco Silva – rhythm guitar, vocals (1995-2011)
- Rodrigo Arias – percussion, drums (since 1990)

== Discography ==
- Ritmo marginal (1990, demo album)
- ¿Democracia? (1991)
- Futuro esplendor (1992, re-released in 2006)
- Pisagua 1973 (1993)
- Te mataré con amor (1994, re-released in 2006)
- Pirata (1995, live album)
- Sin dios ni ley (1996)
- Cambian los payasos... pero el circo sigue (1997)
- Miserables (1998)
- Retroceder nunca/Rendirse jamás (2000, compilation live album)
- Date cuenta (2000)
- Gritos de la calle (2001)
- Pasión de multitudes (2003)
- El ruido de nuestras vidas (2004, compilation album)
- Por los que ya no están (2004, live album)
- La voz del pueblo (2005)
- Siete pecados capitales (2006)
- Luna, una historia de muchas vidas... (2007)
- Alegria y subversión (2009)
- Tributo a La voz de los '80 (2010)
- Politicamente Incorrectos (soeces y anacrónicos) (2013)
