= Jorge González (album) =

Studio album by Jorge González
- Released: 1993
- Recorded: 1992
- Studio: Devonshire Studios, Entourage Studios, Los Angeles, California
- Genre: Latin pop
- Length: 58:39
- Label: EMI Odeon Chilena; 7 89074 2 Capitol; H2Y 89074
- Producer: Gustavo Santaolalla

Jorge González chronology
Jorge González (1993)	El Futuro Se Fue (1994)

Jorge González is the self-titled solo debut of former lead singer and songwriter of the Chilean band Los Prisioneros, recorded in 1992 and released in early 1993. It was produced by Gustavo Santaolalla with Aníbal Kerpel's collaboration. The 14 tracks featured in this album were written and composed by González.

Due to the enormous success that the band had with Corazones, González decided to follow that same musical line on his awaited solo debut. EMI-Odeon, who wanted this release to be a completely exportable product, launched a huge promotion campaign with the purpose of transforming it in Latin America's most important album of 1993.

The first single, "Esta Es Para Hacerte Feliz", featured a totally positive and spiritual González, feelings that he put throughout the album. The song, as well as its corresponding video-clip, were very successful in Chile and Latin America. In the same way, "Mi Casa En El Arbol" and "Fe" enjoyed some success too.

Despite that sales of the album were not bad at all, they didn't fill the expectations of EMI-Odeon and González.

The following year, González recorded El Futuro Se Fue, completely far from the glamour that prevailed on their debut. That album would be the last that he made on EMI-Odeon.

In the United States, Jorge González was released by Capitol Records.

== Track listing ==
- All tracks written by Jorge González.
1. "Esta Es Para Hacerte Feliz" – 4:29
2. "Hombre" – 4:47
3. "Pastilla" – 4:33
4. "Velocidad" – 3:52
5. "Mi Casa En El Arbol" – 4:19
6. "Volar" – 4:25
7. "Voluntad" – 3:04
8. "Fé" – 4:26
9. "Guitarras Viajeras" – 3:22
10. "Piedad" – 4:31
11. "Lluvia" – 4:10
12. "Más Palabras" – 5:50
13. "Mamá" – 3:53
14. "Esas Mañanas" (hidden track) – 2:58

== See also ==
- Los Prisioneros
