= Mi Casa En El Arbol =

Single by Jorge González

from the album Jorge González
- Released: 1993
- Recorded: 1992
- Genre: Latin pop
- Length: 4:19
- Label: EMI-Odeon; Capitol
- Songwriter(s): Jorge González
- Producer(s): Gustavo Santaolalla

"Mi Casa En El Arbol" was one of the successful three singles by Jorge González released from his self-titled solo debut album.

== Cover versions ==
"Mi Casa En El Arbol" was covered by Japanese version of Chilean band Victoriano.

== See also ==
- Los Prisioneros
