= Fiskales Ad-Hok =

Chilean punk band

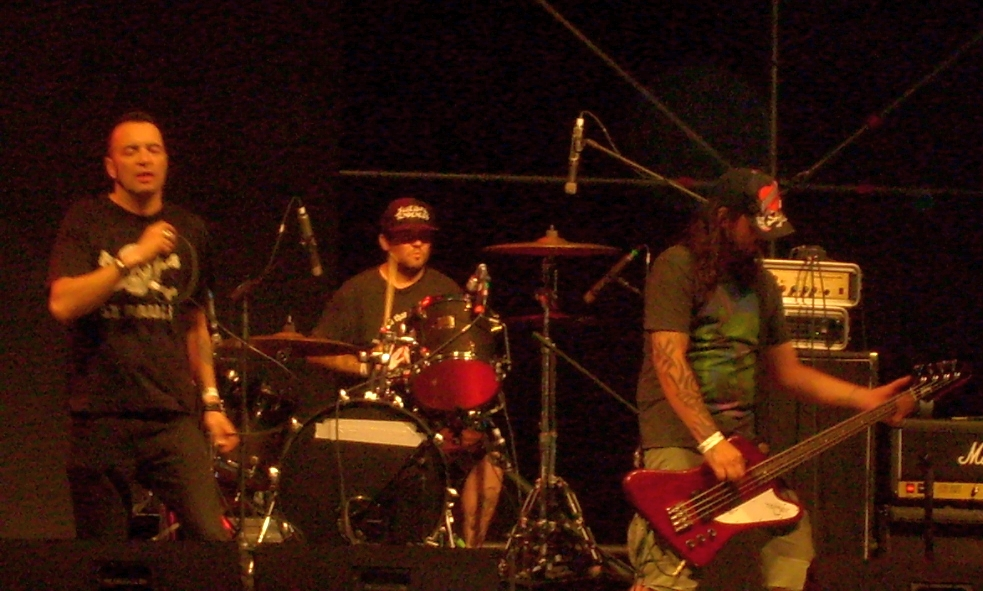

Background information
- Origin: Santiago, Chile
- Genres: Punk rock, hardcore punk
- Years active: 1986–present
- Labels: Oveja Negra, C.F.A.
- Members: Alvaro España; Roli Urzua; Guardabosques; Rodrigo Barahona; Mechas de Clavo
- Past members: Pogo; Ciril; Lagarto; Víbora; Micky Cumplido
- Website: fiskalesadhok.cl

Fiskales Ad-Hok is a Chilean punk band formed in 1986 in Santiago, Chile. Its initial lineup consisted of Alvaro España on vocals, Roly Urzúa on bass, "Polo" on drums, "Cyril" on guitar and "Pogo"—who would go on to become the lead singer of his own band Los Peores de Chile—on guitar and vocals. Their album Fiesta was included in the list of the 50 greatest Chilean albums according to Rolling Stone (Chile).

== Biography ==
=== Beginnings ===
Fiskales Ad-Hok is one of the first bands of the Chilean punk movement. The late emergence of this movement in Chile can be attributed to the fact that beginning in 1973, Chile was under the control of a military dictatorship, like many other Latin American countries. In this climate of extreme political and social tension, the group was formed as a response to the authoritarian government.

The name Fiskales Ad-Hok referred to a position within the same dictatorship, the "ad hoc military prosecutor", held at the time by General Fernando Torres Silva. The band’s first performance took place in 1987 at the 1st Biennial Underground punk festival, organized by Vicente Ruiz. This event was held as a tribute to the lead singer of the punk band Los Dada, known by the nickname of "TV Star". He was also the one who named the band. That same year, they released their first demo with the help of Carlos Cabezas. The demo, titled Matarratas, includes the first official recordings of songs such as "Estúpidos Policías" and "Anarkía y Rebelión". During these early years, the band struggled with instability due to a high turnover of members, especially on drums and guitar, a challenge they didn’t fully resolve until the early 1990s.

=== Consecration (1991–1999) ===
In 1991, a stable lineup was finally achieved with the addition of Argentine guitarist Marcelo "Víbora" Larralde, and a new drummer, Michael "Micky" Cumplido.

The big opportunity for Fiskales Ad-Hok to prove themselves before a large audience came in 1992, when they opened for the American punk band Ramones in Santiago, Chile, during the group's South American tour. This was the turning point where they became known to a much wider audience, rather than just those within the small, underground gig circuit. Consequently, major Chilean record labels took an interest in Fiskales and offered them the opportunity to record an album under a label. It was not until 1993 that they released their self-titled debut studio album, on the independent label Batuta Records. It contained 14 tracks, featuring both new material and songs from their previous demo, including tracks such as "Ranchera", "Borracho", and "Libertad Vigilada", as well as a cover of "Pa pa pa" by the Chilean band Los Prisioneros.

In 1995, Fiskales Ad-Hok released new material featuring several notable changes. On one hand, the album was produced under the Culebra Discos label—a subsidiary of the multinational record company BMG—with which the band felt uncomfortable, leading them to part ways with it after this experience. On the other hand, the album, titled Traga, explores more emotional themes—with tracks like "No estar aquí", "Fuga", and "Eugenia"—without abandoning the sharp social, political, and economic criticism that defines the band. This is reflected in songs such as "Río abajo"—a tribute to the Mapuche people—and "El circo", an overt critique of the political class.

In 1997 the group decided to create their own independent label to solve the problem of finding spaces in which to develop their work free from any kind of pressure, while also ensuring a comfortable working environment. Thus, the label CFA was born. Through it, they released the album Fiesta in 1998—a record widely considered the highest-quality work in their entire discography—which allowed them to carry out a series of tours, including dates in Europe. The album features 15 tracks, most notably "Caldo 'e caeza", "Fiesta", "Odio", "Al puerto", "Cuando muera", and "Resistiré" (a cover of the Spanish group Dúo Dinámico), among others.

=== Last years (since 2000) ===
In 2000, the band recorded a cover of the song "La Cultura de la Basura", for a tribute album to Los Prisioneros. Months later, the group released a new live album titled Ahora, recorded in April of 2000 at the venue "La Batuta". It featured 22 tracks previously included on their earlier works, plus two bonus tracks created in collaboration with the Chilean band La Pozze Latina. This album also marked the debut of drummer Rodrigo "Memo" Barahona. That same year they embarked on their first European tour, which took them to eight countries (Germany, the Netherlands, Belgium, Switzerland, Italy, Austria, the Czech Republic, and Poland). During the tour, they performed within a circuit of social centers and squatted houses, earning significant recognition from the European punk scene.

In 2001, following the departure of band member "Víbora", who relocated to Europe, Fiskales Ad-Hok were invited to perform a live set on the radio program Raras Tocatas Nuevas, on the Rock & Pop radio station. Among the 18 songs they performed, there were several covers that do not appear on any of the band's official records, including "Let's Lynch the Landlord" by the Dead Kennedys, "Pet Sematary" by the Ramones, and "Hybrid Moments" by the Misfits. The performance also featured guest appearances by members of other bands, such as Insurgentes, Yajaira, and Hielo Negro.

The band’s fourth studio album, Calavera, arrived in 2001. Featuring 20 new tracks, it maintained the lyrical themes of their previous works but featured a shift in sound, which prevented them from fully replicating the success of their earlier records. Following this release, the group decided to go on hiatus to pursue personal projects.

In 2004, a new compilation album titled Antología was released, featuring a mix of new songs and live recordings of tracks from previous releases, along with a video for the song "Fiesta". That same year saw the premiere of the documentary Malditos, la historia de los Fiskales Ad Hok, directed by Pablo Insunza. The film chronicles the band's history from its early years, incorporating accounts from various past and present members, as well as people close to the band, such as Carlos Cabezas, Jorge González, and Rolando Ramos, among others. The documentary's screening at various film festivals further boosted the band's popularity. Additionally, the group embarked on their second European tour, which this time included stops in France and Spain, where they gained significant recognition for the power of their lyrics.

In 2006, the band celebrated their 20th anniversary. The celebration began with another appearance on the radio program "Raras Tocatas Nuevas". This time, the band performed 18 songs, including several previously unreleased ones that would later be featured on their next album. The group’s 20th-anniversary celebration concluded on October 9, 2006, with a massive concert that included guest acts such as Curasbún, La Floripondio, Kalibre 38, and the Argentine band Dos Minutos.

In April 2007, they released their fifth studio album, Lindo Momento Frente Al Caos, a record in which the theme of social discontent is kept alive, much like their previous work, and featured very well-structured lyrics. The official launch took place on April 28th during a concert that featured guest bands such as La Floripondio, Entreklles, Asunto, and the Argentine group Espías Secretos. On April 15th of that same year, the band reached another milestone in their career when they opened one of the three stages at the Chile Vive Latino Festival 2007, which drew an audience of 50,000 people.

Throughout 2008, Fiskales Ad-Hok focused on promoting a DVD of the concert held to celebrate the band’s 20th anniversary. In addition, they began working on what would become two new albums: one featuring original songs, and another consisting entirely of covers of punk and new wave artists from the late 70s and early 80s. The latter album, titled 12 due to its 12-track count, was finally released in mid-2009.

In October 2009, along with Brazilian band Sepultura, they served as the opening act for Faith No More at the Estadio Bicentenario de La Florida.

On October 10, 2011, they celebrated their 25th anniversary with a concert at the Teatro Caupolicán, featuring The Sore Losers, Doble Fuerza, La Floripondio, Curasbún, Chico Trujillo, Insurgentes, and the legendary band Los KK. This performance was later released on DVD on December 22, 2012.

== Discography ==
Studio albums

- Matarratas (1987, Independent)
- Fiskales Ad-Hok (1993, La Batuta)
- Traga (1995, BMG)
- Fiesta (1998, CFA)
- Calavera (2001, CFA)
- Antología (2004, CFA)
- Lindo Momento Frente Al Caos (2007, CFA/Oveja Negra)
- 12 (2009, CFA)
- El flagelo (2019, CFA)

Demos

- Por Fin Llegó El Indulto (1988, Independent)

Live albums

- Ahora (2000, CFA)

Recent singles

- Amanecida (2026)
- Precipicio (2026)
