= Traga =

Studio album by Fiskales Ad-Hok
- Released: 1995
- Recorded: 1995
- Genre: Punk rock
- Label: BMG

Fiskales Ad-Hok chronology
Fiskales Ad-Hok (1993)	Traga (1995)	Fiesta (1998)

Traga is the third album by the Chilean band Fiskales Ad-Hok, released in 1995 by Culebra Records, a BMG sub-label. After releasing this album, Fiskales Ad-Hok decided they weren't happy with the label, so they set up an independent label for which they would record all later studio dates.

== Track listing ==
1. Río Abajo
2. Carlitos Jesús
3. Perra
4. No Estar Aquí
5. Algo
6. Gris
7. Eugenia
8. El Perro del Regimiento
9. Fuga
10. El Circo
11. Tevito
12. Con Nuestras Manos
13. Banderitas y Globos (Sumo cover)

== Personnel ==
- Álvaro España – vocals
- Vibora – guitar
- Micky – drums
- Roly Urzua – bass
