= El baile de los que sobran =

1986 song by Los Prisioneros

Single by Los Prisioneros

from the album Pateando piedras
- B-side: "Por favor"
- Released: 1986
- Genre: Pop; Latin rock; new wave
- Label: EMI
- Songwriter: Jorge González

Los Prisioneros singles chronology
"Muevan las Industrias"	"El baile de los que sobran"	"Porque No Se Van"

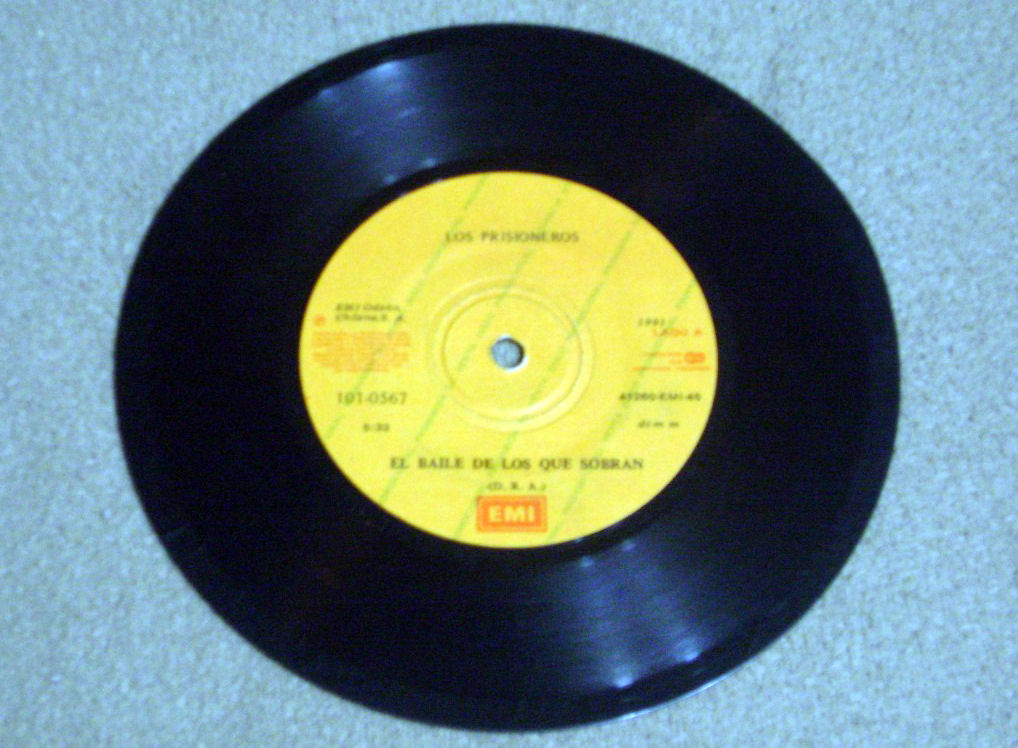
7" promotional single copy of "The Baile de los Que Sobran"

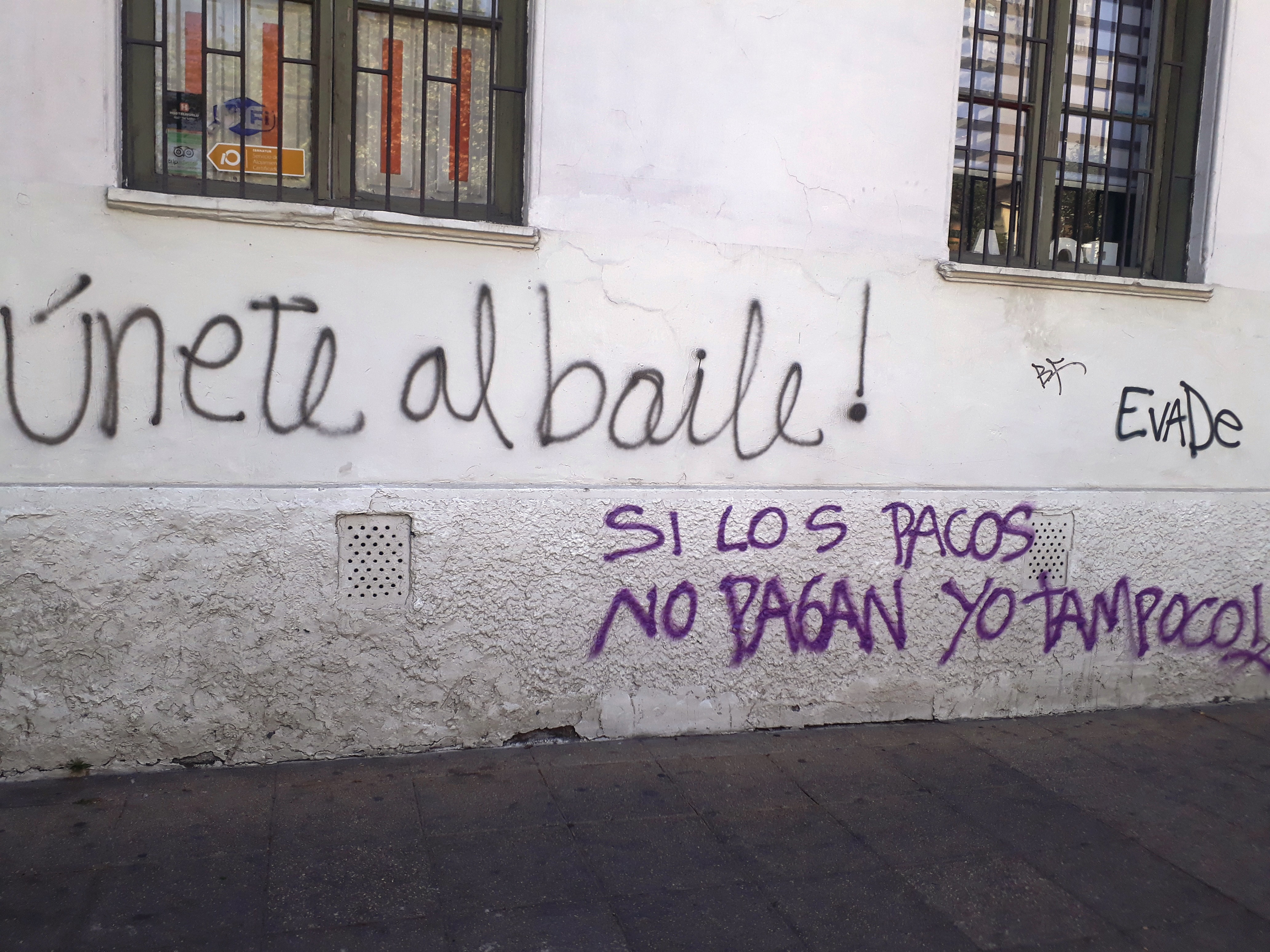
Graffiti inspired by the song in Santiago during the 2019–2020 Chilean protests.

"El baile de los que sobran" (The dance of those left over) is a single from the album Pateando piedras by the Chilean rock/pop band Los Prisioneros. It was considered by the National Library of Chile as one of the most emblematic of Chilean popular music of the 80s.

== Composition and recording ==
"El baile de los que sobran" composed and written by Jorge González, presents strong social criticism regarding "young people marginalized after leaving formal education". Memoria Chilena wrote that lyrics "bitterly and hopelessly illustrates the class differences that exist among Chilean youth. Long before the problem of poor income distribution was incorporated into the public debate in Chile, Los Prisioneros described in a painfully accurate way what it was like to spend twelve years in a numbered high school and then graduate to unemployment".

González assured in some interviews that the dog from which the barking sounds sampled at the beginning of the song were extracted was called "Néstor", who was his mother's pet. For the song, Jorge used a drum machine lent to him by Miguel Conejeros from the Pinochet Boys and was heavily influenced by Heaven 17 and Depeche Mode. At first he had no guitar and the tempo was slower, later he decided to record it again to speed up the tempo, introduce the sampled barking sound and ask Claudio Narea to play acoustic guitar. The band manager, Carlos Fonseca was responsible for its release as a single in 1986.

== Use in politics ==
"El baile de los que sobran", and other songs by Los Prisioneros became a symbol of the struggle against the repression of the military dictatorship and "its vindictive message crossed ages and social segments". As the 1988 plebiscite approached, their music began to be affected by censorship, hardened after the group publicly declared their adherence to the "No" option.

== Cultural references ==
The song also became one of the anthems of the protests held in Chile during 2019, being sung in marches and used in banners and graffiti. Regarding the use of the song, Jorge González said that "it is very sad that people are still singing it. That song was created under the same conditions in which it was sung: with a curfew and bullets."

It also ranked first among the most listened to Chilean songs on Spotify. After the victory of the "Apruebo" option in the 2020 Chilean national plebiscite, the song was also sung by supporters of said option in celebration.

During the Lollapalooza Chile 2026 festival, the Mexican rock band The Warning performed a cover of the Los Prisioneros classic. Later, this version was recorded in the studio and included on the soundtrack of the Disney+ miniseries Dear Killer Nannies.
