= Los Updates =

Chilean musical group (2006-2009)

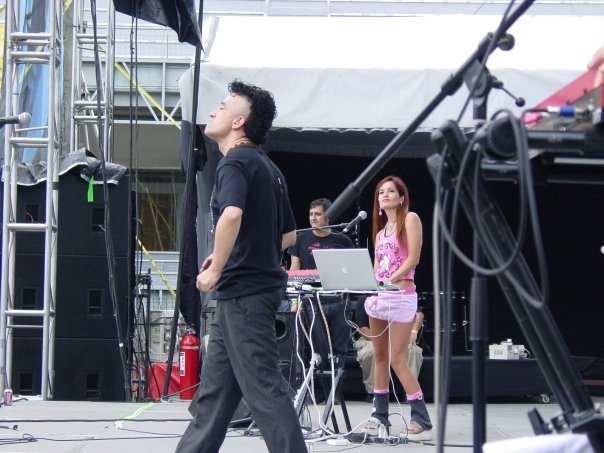
- Los Updates at Vive Latino 2007 in Mexico

Background information
- Origin: Mexico City, Mexico
- Genres: minimal house
- Years active: 2008-2009
- Labels: Noiselab Records, Nacional Records, La Oreja
- Past members: Jorge González Ríos; Loreto Otero

Los Updates was a Chilean electronic music project created by musician Jorge González and photographer Loreto Otero. The project has been musically defined as a blend of "mind-bending minimal house and unabashed pop."

== History ==
In 1997, Jorge González, Dandy Jack and Tobias Freund founded the electronic music group Gonzalo Martínez, merging traditional Latin American music with digital electronics.

Four years later, González wrote the lyrics of songs "You Never Come Back" and "I Am Not The Sound" for the German group Sieg Über Die Sonne, formed by Jack and Freund. He also collaborated on the song "Tour de France" by Señor Coconut.

After the second and final breakup of Los Prisioneros in 2005, González and Loreto Otero decided to relocate to Mexico City.

Influenced by the Chilean electronic scene in Europe during the first decade of the 2000s, represented by artists like Pier Bucci, Uwe Schmidt, Ricardo Villalobos, González and Otero started a project in 2006, originally called Los Plugins and later renamed Los Updates.

In 2007, Los Updates released their first work, titled Jorge González EP in Chile and Los Updates EP internationally.

In 2008, they released their only album, First if you please, under the label Cadenza, owned by Swiss-Chilean DJ Lucien Nicolet. The album was described as a mix of "house, pop, 2-step, 8-bit, funk, rave, and romantic ballad."

After González and Otero split in 2011, the duo disbanded, and the Los Prisioneros vocalist moved to Berlin.
