= La cultura de la basura =

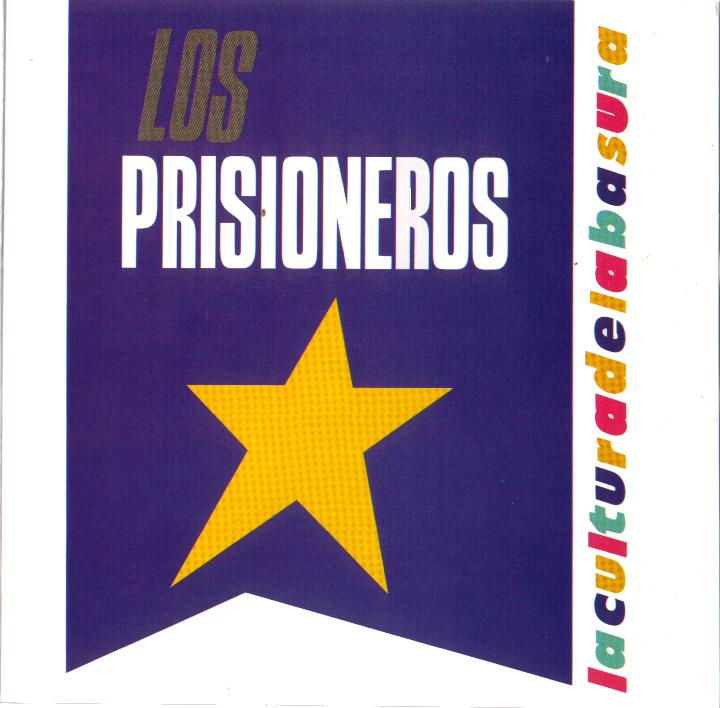

Studio album by Los Prisioneros
- Released: December 3, 1987; July 30, 2014 (Deluxe)
- Recorded: 1987
- Genre: Rock, new wave, techno, ska, punk rock, vals
- Label: EMI
- Producer: Carlos Fonseca

Los Prisioneros chronology
Pateando piedras (1986)	La cultura de la basura (1987)	Corazones (1990)

La cultura de la basura (Spanish for "The culture of Garbage" or "Junk Culture") is the third album by Chilean rock band Los Prisioneros. Due to the heavy censorship of the military regime in Chile, Los Prisioneros focused in promoting the album outside Chile in other Latin American countries; for this purpose, a special Latin American edition was released.

== Track listing ==
- All songs are written by Jorge González except where indicated.
1. "Somos sólo ruido" (We're Just Noise) (Miguel Tapia, Claudio Narea)
2. "De la cultura de la basura" (From the Culture of Garbage/From the Junk Culture)
3. "Que no destrocen tu vida" (Don't Let Them Destroy Your Life)
4. "Usted y su ambición" (You and Your Ambition)
5. "Cuando te vayas" (Whenever You Leave)
6. "Jugar a la guerra" (Playing War)
7. "Algo tan moderno" (Something Very Modern) (Tapia, Narea)
8. "Maldito sudaca" (Damn Spic)
9. "Lo estamos pasando muy bien" (We're Having A Good Time) (Tapia, Narea)
10. "Él es mi ídolo" (He Is My Idol)
11. "El vals" (The Waltz) (Tapia, Narea)
12. "Otro día" (Another Day)
13. "Pa pa pa"
14. "Poder elegir" (Right of Choosing)

=== Latin American edition ===
1. "We are sudamerican rockers" (Spanglish for "We Are South American Rockers")
2. "Que no destrocen tu vida"
3. "Pa pa pa"
4. "Maldito sudaca"
5. "Lo estamos pasando muy bien" (Tapia, Narea)
6. "Él es mi ídolo"
7. "Usted y su ambición"
8. "Jugar a la guerra"

=== Deluxe Edition CD2 iTunes Argentina, Estados Unidos, Venezuela and Chile ===
No.	Title	Length
15.	"We are sudamerican rockers"	3:41
16.	"Que No Destrocen Tu Vida (Latin American Edition) - Remezcla"	4:24
17.	"Que No Destrocen Tu Vida (Single Version)"	4:03
18.	"Pa pa pa (Latin American Edition) - Remezcla"	3:35
19.	"Maldito sudaca (Latin American Edition) - Remezcla"	2:24
20.	"Lo estamos pasando muy bien (New Version)"	5:42
21.	"Lo estamos pasando muy bien (Single Version)"	4:17
22.	"Él es mi ídolo (Latin American Edition) - Remezcla"	4:56
23.	"Él es mi ídolo (7" Version)"	3:52
24.	"Él es mi ídolo (No Fade Version) - 1987 Version, 2001 Remix"	5:38
25.	"Usted y su ambición (Latin American Edition) - Remezcla"	3:45
26.	"Jugar a la guerra (Latin American Edition) - Remezcla"	3:30
27.	"Las Sierras Eléctricas"	4:27
28.	"Las Sierras Eléctricas (Single Edit)"	4:38
29.	"Cierra Todas las Puertas de Tu Casa: Que No Destrocen Tu Vida - 1987 Version, 2001 Remix"	6:24
30.	"De la cultura de la basura - Radio Version"	2:55
31.	"Que No Destrocen Tu Vida - Remix"	4:15

== Credits ==
- Jorge González – lead vocals, bass guitar, piano, programming, sequencer, keyboards, synthesizers, production
- Claudio Narea – guitar, keyboards, synthesizers, backing vocals; lead vocals on «Lo estamos pasando muy bien» and «El vals»
- Miguel Tapia – drums, electronic drums, sequencer, programming, percussion, backing vocals; lead vocals on «Somos sólo ruido» and «Algo tan moderno»
- Carlos Fonseca – production
