= Pateando piedras =

Studio album by Los Prisioneros
- Released: September 15, 1986
- Recorded: June–August 1986
- Genres: Synth-pop; new wave; post-punk
- Length: 44:48
- Language: Spanish
- Label: EMI
- Producer: Alejandro Lyon

Los Prisioneros chronology
La voz de los '80 (1984)	Pateando piedras (1986)	La cultura de la basura (1987)

Singles from Pateando piedras
- 1. "Muevan las industrias" Released: September 8, 1986; 2. "Quieren dinero" Released: November 2, 1986; 3. "El baile de los que sobran" Released: January 31, 1987; 4. "¿Por qué no se van?" Released: April 20, 1987

Pateando piedras (Kicking stones) is the second studio album by the Chilean group Los Prisioneros. It was released on September 15, 1986, in cassette format in Chile and 12-inch vinyl in South America. It was the group's first album to be released by a multinational company. It sold five thousand copies in its advance sale, and reached ten thousand units sold in a short time. The album was preceded by the hit single, "Muevan las industrias", which featured the group drawing European techno influences from bands like Depeche Mode.

It meant the band's leap to massiveness and the defeat of the censorship imposed by the dictatorship, by vetoing them on television and in the media. On November 1, 1986, the group promoted the album with two upside-down recitals at the Chile Stadium. The album became famous for its lyrics focused on social issues and a danceable sound with electronic components.

It was chosen as the 15th best Chilean album of all time, according to Rolling Stone Chile magazine. In this way, it shares an important place in the musical history of Chile. It was reissued on CD for the first time in 1991, then in 1995 and in 2011 it was remastered along with the albums La Cultura De La Basura, La voz de los '80 and Corazones.

== Background ==
Jorge González composed Pateando piedras on the road when Los Prisioneros were covering demands for concerts throughout Chile: "When I think of Pateando Piedras, I evoke something provincial, clean, and I especially remember Concepción, because a large part of those songs were made while we were playing in the south".

In 1985 Jorge González joined the group on keyboards. He and Miguel Tapia -as the band's guitarist Claudio Narea points out- had become followers of Depeche Mode and other groups that used the keyboard as their main instrument. González bought a Casio CZ 101, with lower case keys, and later bought one just like it. With this instrument he composed "¿Quién le tiene miedo a las máquinas?", "Pendiente fuerte de ti", "Ellos dicen no" and "Muevan las industrias" which made their debut in August of that year in a presentation at the Cariola Theater. The last two songs were the only ones included on the group's second album, while the song "Ellos dicen no", which talked about the media closing its doors on them, was completely modified and became "Por favor".

== Recording ==
The recording of the album began in the winter of June 1986 after Santiago was recovering from a storm that overflowed the Mapocho River. For the recording of this album they worked again with the engineer Caco Lyon, who played a fundamental role in this work. Pateando piedras was a different recording from La voz de los '80. "Seven of the songs do not have a bass but a keyboard bass. All the drums are programmed and three of the songs don't have a guitar," said Narea. Claudio bought two Fender guitars, a Lead 1 and a Telecaster Deluxe, both black; Jorge got himself a Linn drum machine, borrowed from Miguel Conejeros of the Pinochet Boys group, he bought three Casio synthesizers, and a Simmons electronic drum set. However Jorge had already played the keyboard for the previous album but as an accompaniment to the songs and in Pancho Straub's studies a drum programmer was used. The first disc was recorded with an 8-track recorder and the second disc with a 16-track recorder. For this disc, sequencers such as the Voyetra were used, where it was recorded with a time code that controlled the sequencers, leaving 15 free tracks, he said. Lyon. The songs now came prepared and were not rehearsed.

Claudio only participated playing the guitars, he could not get used to going from being a trio of guitar, bass and drums to being a techno group, also he never felt comfortable playing the keyboard, so he left the sessions early to go to see who his wife, Claudia Carvajal, would be months later. He played the acoustic guitar on the song "El baile de los que sobran". They recorded a first version of this song, it was a rhythm box with a bass, at the beginning it didn't have a guitar, and the tempo was faster. Jorge didn't like it, so he recorded it again and asked Claudio to play the guitar, they lowered the tempo, and added the barking of the dog with the Emulator 2 sampler, according to Jorge González, without the dog, the song would have been dull.

"Muevan las industrias" was recorded with a Linn Drum, the programmable battery that was in Chile at the time. Jorge González stated that he imagined the song while riding the subway to the university. The metallic sounds that can be heard were produced by Jorge hitting a gas cylinder from "Caco" Lyon's kitchen. He had previously tried to obtain these sounds with an iron that he collected from the Mapocho River.

This theme was originally made as part of a quartet: "Muevan las industrias", "¿Quién le tiene miedo a las máquinas?", "Arte para cuatro gatos" and "Por favor" (in its first version). We thought it was going to be a single and we recorded it separately before the rest of the album. The lyrics were the fantasy of an uninhabited industry, but with a lot of resonance from when they fired a lot of people in '82, in that economic downturn where Miguel's father also lost his job.

== Style and songs ==
Lalo Ibeas, leader of the group Chancho en Piedra, said that it was very risky "to have made their second album radically changing the sound of the band, going from guitars to The Clash style, to the sound of synthesizers, and yet they kept playing like Los Prisioneros." Jorge has stated that he likes to make more electronic music and also because it has more diffusion, declaring that Los Prisioneros were more of a techno-pop group than a rock group. Musicologist Juan Pablo González considers it the essential album and a turning point in the band's career. "He marked a sound bridge in the 80s, from an artisan sound, where the wool of Chilote vests and arpeggiated guitars prevailed, towards this new wave world, of technological sounds and very clear texts, where there was no room for metaphors and the political agenda of the time", he also said that simple things like the barking of a dog, or the sound of a gas cylinder portrayed the Chilean society of the time genuinely.

The first track "Muevan las industrias" talks about unemployment. According to Colombia.com, in Chile "there was a feeling of disappointment and anxiety due to the unemployment rates caused by the clearing of the national industry to make room for British, North American and French companies that invested in the country's economy and They stayed with the markets. Many people wandered the streets looking for what to do to survive, from this phenomenon arises "Muevan las industrias"". The second theme, "¿Por qué no se van?" criticized the avant-garde of the time, those snobbish artists and intellectuals who wanted to leave the country. The third song, "El baile de los que sobran" is considered by the group to be their best song and one of the most emblematic of Chilean popular music of the eighties. It tells about young people who were promised to go to university but, nevertheless, the neoliberal system left them with no chance of studying, leaving them practically unemployed for their future.

"Estar solo" was described by González himself as a combination between The Cure and Depeche Mode that "didn't turn out very well" and described the lyrics as "half embarrassing", considering it one of the poorest songs on the album. "Por favor" was the curtain of a Radio Beethoven program that Carlos Fonseca, the band's manager, had. According to Jorge González, it was the first song by Los Prisioneros to have an acoustic piano.

== Artwork ==
On the cover, Los Prisioneros appear on Line 2 of the Santiago Metro going to San Miguel. In the original photo, Miguel appears standing, with his arms behind his head, looking into space; sitting in front of him, Jorge and Claudio looking at the camera. Jorge with an ironic smile and Claudio laughing happily. In 1987, during a promotional tour in Buenos Aires, Argentina, the guitarist recounted in his book Los Prisioneros: Biografía de una amistad, that the album cover had a different photo. "He looked the same except for one small detail: I didn't appear laughing," he said. As the representative of the group —Carlos Fonseca— explained to him, the original had been lost, so they decided to look for the one closest to the sequence —taken a second before or after the other— to replace it. "It was almost the same, only in this one I had a lost look," Claudio explained. Later, in Chile, the photograph was also changed, then, when Pateando piedras came out on CD, the photo where Claudio was smiling came out, however, shortly after they replaced it again with the other one. "Summarizing, the story goes like this: Kicking stones was released in September 1986. But already in April 1987 there was another photo. Then in 1991 it appeared. Then, in 1992, it got lost again," he concluded. The session at the Metro was in charge of Jorge Brantmayer, inspired by the techno "wave" that the band took with their publicized Casio synthesizers and Simmons de Tapia drums. The vinyl edition, which could only be purchased at Fusión, had a low-angle photo of the band on the back cover in front of a high-voltage tower, 40 kilometers south of Santiago, on the way to Rancagua.

Los Prisioneros never liked the photos of the Metro, according to Fonseca. At first Jorge suggested to Carlos that the three of them appear in the photo in a huge green field, and that they could be seen walking in the distance, however, EMI rejected the idea, since, according to them, it was going to look like a Los Huasos Quincheros album.

== Release ==
This album was released on September 15, 1986, a week after the attack against Pinochet in the Cajón del Maipo. The album sold five thousand copies in the first ten days of its distribution. A record never reached by a youth music group in Chile and in two months and two days after the album came out they achieved a second platinum record with twenty thousand copies sold, something that no artist had achieved since the days of the Nueva ola. Two months after the release of their second album, in November 1986 they officially launched Pateando piedras, appearing at the Chile Stadium in front of some 11,000 people. The group broke a record by filling the venue twice in a row.

After that the media began to take Los Prisioneros seriously. Super Rock magazine pointed them out as the best group in Chile. In addition, he awarded Pateando piedras as the best album, Jorge González as the best composer and chose the song "El baile de los que sobran" as the best song of the year. Other media did the same. The first single to be launched was "Muevan las Industrias".

== Legacy ==
Before the anniversary no. 20 the Chilean actor Héctor Morales said that the album lyrics are still current, and that they can fit in any stage of the country. And shortly before for the anniversary no. 25, Jaime Bollolio from El Mercurio made an analysis of Chile today with the songs from Pateando piedras according to his order, from "Muevan las industrias" to "Independencia cultural", reaching contingent topics such as the student movement and HidroAysén. Not only does the contingency arrive in Chile for the album lyrics, but also in countries like Colombia and Peru. In the latter they were a phenomenon at the end of the eighties, according to Mario Ruiz, EMI Marketing Manager at the time, Los Prisioneros managed to open those markets for "rock en español".

The album was chosen as one of the most important of the Ibero-American Rock scene, placing Nº 160 on the list, "Los 250 mejores discos de rock iberoamericano", published by American magazine Al Borde, in 2006. In 2008, it was chosen as the 15th-best Chilean album by Rolling Stone magazine. In this way, it shares an important place in the musical history of Chile. "Quieren dinero" was the main theme of the Chilean soap opera Cómplices (2006), being interpreted by Rigo Vizcarra. It was also part of the soundtrack of the Colombian Netflix film El robo del siglo (2020).

== Track listing ==
Side A

All music is composed by Jorge González.

No.	Title	Length
1.	"Muevan las industrias"	4:08
2.	"¿Por qué no se van?"	3:01
3.	"El baile de los que sobran"	5:22
4.	"Estar solo"	4:33
5.	"Exijo ser un héroe"	5:44

Side B

No.	Title	Length
1.	"Quieren dinero"	5:10
2.	"Por favor"	3:32
3.	"Por qué los ricos"	4:57
4.	"Una mujer que no llame la atención"	3:22
5.	"Independencia cultural"	4:34
Total length:		44:48

== Bibliography ==
- Aguayo, Emiliano (2005). Maldito Sudaca. Conversaciones con Jorge González. Ril Editores. ISBN 978-956-284-449-9.
- Narea, Claudio (2009). Mi vida como prisionero. Norma. ISBN 978-956-300-186-0.
- Narea, Claudio (2014). Los Prisioneros: Biografía de una amistad. Thabang. ISBN 956-353-804-8.
