= Tren al Sur =

Single by Los Prisioneros

from the album Corazones
- Released: 7 May 1990
- Genre: Pop
- Length: 5:39
- Label: EMI
- Producer(s): Gustavo Santaolalla

Los Prisioneros singles chronology
"We Are South American Rockers" (1988)	"Tren al Sur" (1990)	"Estrechez De Corazón" (1990)

"Tren al Sur" (English: "Train to the South") is a song from the album Corazones by the Chilean rock/pop band Los Prisioneros, released as the main single on May 7, 1990. It was considered one of the 50 most important Latin pop songs by Rolling Stone and one of the most groundbreaking Hispanic songs by The Observer. Its music video was nominated for the International Viewer's Choice in the 1990 MTV Video Music Awards.

== Composition and recording ==
During the recording of their 1990 album, Corazones, the band's vocalist Jorge González dedicated himself to making different demos of more than 19 songs (of which only nine remained for the album), among them were "Por amarte" and "Tren al Sur". He came to make up 3 different versions of both songs, trying to find the environment and the most perfect form of each one. The "most drastic influence for these songs" was during his visit in Bogota, Colombia in 1988, when Claudio Narea showed him some acid house-style records that he bought in France. He talked to his friend Cecilia Aguayo to be his keyboardist.

"Tren al Sur" leaned towards "new musical fashions like the ballads". Its tempo and synth line was mainly based on the 1987 single "Touched by the Hand of God" by English rock band New Order. González programmed the drums and the band's producer, Gustavo Santaolalla, decided to make "a little stop, one where the train stops and they continue singing the chorus only with the noise of the train in the background". According to González, that "rounded off the song" and he also mentioned the importance of a charango brought by Gustavo.

He claimed that the song originated after starring in a "destructive romance", and in a 1990 interview with Rock & Pop magazine stated that "Tren al Sur" and "Es demasiado triste" were written by him "in a slight state of intoxication". According to the former member of Los Prisioneros, the song conveys: "The happiness of the simple, which means enjoying the journey, that journey through life. Although it was composed by Jorge González, a former bandmate, as an interpreter I can say that it is a song that has transpired."

== Release ==
"Tren al Sur" was released on the EMI label as the first single from the album Corazones on May 7, 1990, prior to the official release of the album, and was planned to play on Chilean radio stations. The objective initially had complications, since it had gone six months without playing on the radio. In 1989, the radios had put aside Rock en español and gave importance to other genres. "In fact, there were new albums by Soda (Stereo) and people didn't give a damn ball", González said in an interview with the Rock & Pop radio.

== Music video ==
The difficulties of recording the single caused Jorge to resort to the creation of a music video supported by producer Gustavo. This video "melancholic and frank" was directed by Cristián Galaz, and filmed in Estación Central in June 1990. After the completion of the music video, the song began to play on several Chilean radio stations. It was nominated for an MTV Video Music Award in the category "International Viewer's Choice: MTV Internacional", but lost to “Oye mi Canto” by Gloria Estefan.

== Critical reception ==
In 2018, the Spanish language version of Rolling Stone magazine chose it as one of the eighteen most important Latin pop songs, and it commented that in this song, Jorge "revisits moments of his childhood; he remembers the sound of the locomotive, the smell of metal, the beautiful Chilean landscapes and the hug of his father." It also cited the influence it had on artists such as Alex Anwandter, Gepe, and Javiera Mena. The Observer's Alice Moreno considered it one of the most groundbreaking Hispanic songs.

== Legacy ==
"Tren al Sur" was featured in an episode of the Chilean animated series Diego and Glot in which the band played it on a train. The book Tren al sur: tropicalización del gótico en el Río de la Plata honored the song. In 2018, a video of several students from the Alicante del Valle de Puente Alto School singing the song was recorded and went viral. The video was shared by González himself on his Facebook account. It was covered by different artists, including Mexican synth-pop band Mœnia, and Chilean rock band Lucybell. In 2020, to commemorate the 30th anniversary of the release of the Corazones album, several artists such as Javiera Mena, Pedropiedra and Miranda! made a version of the song "Tren al Sur", led by the band producer Gonzálo Yañez.
