= Los Prisioneros (album) =

Studio album by Los Prisioneros
- Released: 5 June 2003
- Recorded: 2002–2003
- Genre: Rock, pop rock, synthpop, eurodance
- Length: Warner Music
- Producer: Jorge González, Carlos Fonseca

Los Prisioneros chronology
Músicos, poetas y locos (2003)	Los Prisioneros (2003)	Los Prisioneros en las Raras Tocatas Nuevas de la Rock & Pop (2003)

Los Prisioneros is the fifth studio album by the Chilean band Los Prisioneros, released on 5 June 2003. It debuted 13 years after the release of their fourth studio album, Corazones, and followed their reunion as a band after a nearly decade-long hiatus. Released by Warner Music Chile, it featured 10 new songs and was the final album recorded by the original members of Los Prisioneros.

== Track listing ==
No.	Title	Author	Length
1.	"Ultra Derecha"	Jorge González
2.	"El Otro Extranjero"	Jorge González
3.	"San Miguel"	Jorge González
4.	"Concepción"	Jorge González
5.	"Canción del Trabajo"	Claudio Narea/Jorge González
6.	"Europa"	Jorge González
7.	"Los Templos"	Jorge González
8.	"Violencia"	Jorge González
9.	"Mami"	Jorge González
10.	"En el Cementerio"	Jorge González

== Discarded demos and songs ==
- "Canción del Trabajo (Demo)" Model of the topic "Work Song", performed by guitarist and drummer Claudio Narea Miguel Tapia. This version has no violins or trumpets, or has the same chorus of the original.
- "Fiesta Nuclear" (Narea) composed by Claudio Narea topic. The song was not rejected by the style of the album, and for failing to convince the band. It was finally recorded in 2010 by the duo Narea and Tapia, composed by guitarist and drummer of Los Prisioneros.

== Musicians ==
- Jorge González – lead vocals, guitars, bass, contrabass, organ, piano, keyboards, synthesizers, percussion, programming.
- Claudio Narea – guitars, keyboards, synthesizers, organ, harmonica, melodica, percussion, backing vocals.
- Miguel Tapia – drums, percussion, programming, backing vocals.
- Coty Badilla: keyboards, synthesizers, programming, sequences.
