= La voz de los '80 =

Studio album by Los Prisioneros
- Released: December 13, 1984
- Recorded: March–December, 1984
- Venue: Santiago de Chile
- Genre: New wave; ska; reggae; post-punk
- Length: 40:22
- Label: Fusion; EMI
- Producer: Jorge González

Los Prisioneros chronology
La voz de los '80 (1984)	Pateando piedras (1986)

La voz de los '80 (The voice of the '80s) is the debut studio album by the Chilean band Los Prisioneros, released independently under the Fusion label on December 13, 1984. Produced by leader, vocalist, and songwriter Jorge González, who credited it to the name of the band. A thousand copies were released in cassette format at its launch, today these cassettes are considered cult objects of Chilean rock. In 1985, Los Prisioneros signed a contract with EMI Odeón Chilena, who re-issued La voz de los '80 nationally and with Latin American projection that year, managing to sell around 100,000 copies in Chile.

The album was recorded initially and for the most part at Francisco Straub studios, but it was finished and mixed at Caco Lyon studios. It was characterized by combining the simple sound of guitar, bass and drums. The songs are critical of the world during the 1980s, managing in the song "Latinoamérica es un pueblo al sur de Estados Unidos" to capture the atmosphere of US imperialism and the omnipresent Cold War in the subcontinent.

It is considered the most important rock album in Chile and also the most important youth album in Chilean music, since the members of the band were no more than twenty years old at the time they began recording. EMOL included the album in its selection of 35 fundamental albums of Chilean popular music, Al Borde placed it in position 131 of the "250 albums of Ibero-American Rock", it was chosen as the third best Chilean album of all time, according to Rolling Stone Chile magazine, surpassed by Alturas de Machu Picchu, by Los Jaivas, in second place, and Las últimas composiciones, by Violeta Parra, in the first place. It's placed in the position 33 of the "600 Discos de Latinoamérica" list.

== Background and composition ==
Jorge González, Claudio Narea and Miguel Tapia met in March 1979, at Liceo No. 6 for men in the San Miguel commune. This high school was not only representative for being the place where they met, as González explained during a visit to his establishment in 1987, it was also instrumental in the creation of the band's first album. In 1982, when they were in their last year of high school, they learned to play the guitar, it was at that time that González began to write the first songs that would be part of the debut album.

After taking the Academic Aptitude Test (PAA), in March 1983, González entered the Faculty of Arts at the University of Chile to study a degree in music. Among his colleagues were those who would later form part of the new Chilean pop scene: Igor Rodríguez (future Aparato Raro), Robert Rodríguez (future Banda 69) and Carlos Fonseca, with the last two he quickly established a friendship; Fonseca first became friends with González and Igor, because their musical tastes were similar and different from the rest.

Fonseca, born in Peru in 1961, arrived in Chile at the age of four but moved with his family to Argentina ten years later, and would return to Chile in another ten years. Regarding his first impression upon returning, he recalled: «I found myself in a country where there was nothing and the relationship of the people with music was very light». According to the NaciónRock.com website, culture, bohemia, and youth had been annihilated by the shock policies implemented by military fascism. Fonseca entered the Catholic University to study commercial engineering, at the same time he opened the Fusión record store. The following year, with the approval of his father, Mario Fonseca, he dropped out of college to switch to music. At that time he dedicated himself completely to Fusion, and after taking the PAA, he entered the Faculty of Arts.

González immediately stood out as a sharp and brilliant student. He teased the music reading teacher and her classmates laughed; In those circumstances, Fonseca began to speak to him. According to the unauthorized biographer of Los Prisioneros, Freddy Stock, one afternoon while they were waiting for Juan Amenábar, their audition teacher, Fonseca approached González to see what he was writing, concentrating on his notebook, and read the first scribbles of "Latinoamérica es un pueblo al sur de Estados Unidos". Later, when she recalled the moment, she said that she had found him "originally talented."

At the end of the class, González went to another piano taught by a teacher named Georgina González, but instead of practicing what she requested, he composed half of the repertoire that would make up the first album: "Latinoamérica es un pueblo al sur de Estados Unidos", "Eve-Evelyn", "No necesitamos banderas", «La voz de los '80» and other songs that did not remain. Later she made the arrangements for the guitar and drums. César Quezada, a classmate at the Faculty, pointed out that González's first compositions were very simple in C and A minor, "and, precisely, those are the first scales that begin to be seen in the first semester of a career like this." Quezada also said that he was amazed to see that there was a semitone between the white notes on the piano, and under that logic he created "Eve-Evelyn". «In other words, he hardly knew anything, she assimilated it and composed. He converted it to his music». González explained that when he made songs like "Eve-Evelyn", he had a certain concern for the semitones and for a type of harmony that put "as a nervous medium".

According to González's biographer, Manuel Maira, he composed "La voz de los '80" as a ballad, but little by little his pulse quickened, until it became a "disco hit"; He recorded the first demo using two boom boxes, together with Tapia, to whom he told that "the drums had to save bass drums and rolls to speed up his game." Then he created the solo and the lyrics. Narea changed the strum later, which was flat, and González was fine with it.

On July 1, González, Narea and Tapia debuted under the name Los Prisioneros, at the Miguel León Prado School Song Festival, where they also premiered their new repertoire with the songs that González wrote in recent weeks, motivated by his experiences at the university, together with old songs from his previous groups: Los Pseudopillos and Los Vinchukas. When Fonseca met the rest of the group, he pointed out to González and Tapia that Narea had to be changed, seeing that he was not very neat on the guitar, however, they refused to replace him, since all three of them formed Los Prisioneros.

== Recording ==
=== Demos ===
Fonseca managed to convince his father Mario to invest in the band because it had future prospects. In November 1983, having already become their manager, he took them to record the first demos, on the second floor of the Fusión record store, in an amateur studio that he himself set up with egg boxes on the wall. Quezada, who was a frequent client of Fusión, had the task of recording them. About the process, he explained: "It was recorded from one stereo deck to another, first on two tracks, they were joined, passed to the mixer and joined to two other tracks." According to Narea, Fonseca provided his companions with stimulants because he believed that this was the only way they could perform, since the recording would be done at night; He also recalled that they already had "La voz de los '80" and "Brigada de negro" in their repertoire, but there were also other songs later discarded, such as reggae "Para eso está la publicidad" and "La gran oportunidad", the last about the lack of opportunities for new artists.

The result of the recording left "an impressive noise of tapes," said Quezada, "but it served to record a marathon session of a whole weekend, very exhausting, until we had the first cassette." The quality of the instruments was mediocre, Narea said. «We didn't even have amplifiers, so generally, Carlos Fonseca had to rent them. [...] It was illogical that we, who were headliners everywhere, did not have decent instruments». Mario continued to invest money in the band until he was able to buy his own instruments, which came to fruition in October 1984. Later the band had to return everything invested with the little they earned in concerts, which took them a year and a half; that is, they did not make money until 1986.

A few weeks later, Fonseca—under the pseudonym Alberto Velazco—wrote an article about the band in a magazine called Mundo Diners Club. On December 30, "La voz de los '80" and "Brigada de negro" are broadcast by Radio Beethoven to all of Santiago, but with few listeners. In early 1984, they recorded more demos at Fusion, including "No necesitamos banderas", "Sexo" y "Mentalidad televisiva".

== Artwork and title ==
Two covers were made, the first for the Fusión label and the second for the EMI reissue, the latter being the best known. The photograph for the first album cover was taken by Cristián Galaz (who also made the second cover) in February 1984 in an abandoned factory belonging to the Compañía de Cervecerías Unidas (CCU) at Fonseca's idea. "I like that half-destroyed environment that surrounds the group in that photo," Galaz said. «I was older than them, I was about five or six years older, and it seemed to me that the best concept was that half-punk thing and not at all glamorous or colorful, considering that that was the aesthetic that was imposed at that time of the 80s. This is raw and black and white. Very “Prisoners”.

== Release ==
For its launch on December 13, 1984, a thousand copies were edited and sold in cassette format, and today these cassettes are considered cult objects of Chilean rock. The cover photo was taken in February of that same year by Cristián Galáz. Others were distributed to various record stores, including Feria del Disco, and in March, 1985 Fonseca made another 500 copies. In its first edition, the album was not well received. Fonseca recalled: "It was difficult for people to grasp it right off the bat; at Fusión we were surrounded by people who knew about music, I recommended many artists, most of them were surprised but they did not take the weight as I did. Starting with the broadcast media, the radio was not interested in Los Prisioneros at first".

In August 1985, the EMI label reissued the album with new artwork, which also was photographed by Galáz, but this time it was in La Vega Central instead. It managed to sell 100,000 copies in Chile.

== Track listing ==
Side A

All tracks are written by Jorge González, except where noted.

No.	Title	Length
1.	"La Voz de los '80"	4:08
2.	"Brigada de Negro"	3:46
3.	"Latinoamérica es un Pueblo al Sur de Estados Unidos"	4:02
4.	"Eve-Evelyn"	4:24
5.	"Sexo"	4:48

Side B

No.	Title	Writer(s)	Length
1.	"¿Quién mató a Marilyn?"	González; Tapia	3:08
2.	"Paramar"		3:45
3.	"No Necesitamos Banderas"		5:09
4.	"Mentalidad Televisiva"		4:16
5.	"Nunca Quedas Mal Con Nadie"		4:11
Total length:			40:22

== Personnel ==
- Jorge González (lead vocals, bass guitar, keyboards)
- Claudio Narea (electric guitar, backing vocals)
- Miguel Tapia (electronic drums, backing vocals, and the lead vocal on the song "¿Quién mató a Marilyn?")
- Francisco Straub (recording, mixing)
- Caco Lyon (recording, mixing)
- Vicente Vargas (cover)
- Cristián Galaz (photography)

== Bibliography ==
- Aguayo, Emiliano (4 June 2012). Las voces de los '80: Conversaciones con los protagonistas del fenómeno pop-rock (in Spanish). Santiago de Chile: RIL Editores.
- González, Jorge; Aguayo, Emiliano (2005). Maldito sudaca: conversaciones con Jorge González : la voz de los '80 (in Spanish). Red Internacional del Libro. ISBN 978-956-284-449-9.
- Contardo, Óscar (2005). La era ochentera : tevé, pop y under en el Chile de los ochenta. Santiago, Chile: Ediciones B Chile. ISBN 956-304-006-6.
- Gómez, Nayive Ananías (2015). "Si aquí tu genio y talento no da fama. Análisis de la trayectoria de Los Prisioneros entre 1984 y 1990 desde una perspectiva musicológica interdisciplinaria" (pdf). Alberto Hurtado University.
- Maira, Manuel (1 October 2016). Jorge Gonzalez. Una Historia Original (in Spanish). Penguin Random House Grupo Editorial Chile. ISBN 978-956-304-256-6.
- Narea, Claudio (2009). Mi vida como prisionero. Santiago, Chile: Grupo Ed. Norma. ISBN 978-956-300-186-0.
- Narea, Claudio (2014). Los prisioneros : biografía de una amistad (Primeraición, agosto de 2014 ed.). Santiago de Chile: Thabang Ediciones. ISBN 978-9563538045.
- Osses, Julio (2002). Exijo ser un héroe : la historia (real) de Los Prisioneros. Santiago, Chile: Aguilar. ISBN 956-239-217-1.
- Salas Zuñiga, Fabio (2003). La primavera terrestre : cartografías del rock chileno y la nueva canción chilena (1a ed.). Providencia, Santiago: Editorial Cuarto Propio. ISBN 978-956-260-291-4.
- Stock, Freddy (2015) [1999]. Corazones Rojos (in Spanish). Penguin Random House: Penguin Random House Grupo Editorial Chile. ISBN 978-956-9582-20-2.
