= Corazones =

Studio album by Los Prisioneros
- Released: May 20, 1990
- Studios: Entourage Studios (Los Angeles); Mad Dog Studios (Los Angeles)
- Genres: Synth-pop; new wave; dance-pop; electro-disco
- Length: 45:19
- Language: Spanish
- Labels: EMI; Capitol
- Producer: Gustavo Santaolalla

Los Prisioneros chronology
La cultura de la basura (1989)	Corazones (1990)	Los Prisioneros (2003)

Singles from Corazones
- 1. "Tren al Sur" Released: May 7, 1990; 2. "Estrechez de corazón" Released: September 22, 1990; 3. "Corazones rojos" Released: October 7, 1990

Corazones (Spanish for "Hearts") is the fourth studio album by the Chilean rock band Los Prisioneros. Released on May 20, 1990, by EMI Records (with overseas distribution by Capitol Records), the album was produced by Argentine musician Gustavo Santaolalla with associate producer Aníbal Kerpel. It was recorded, mixed, and mastered at Entourage Studios and Mad Dog Studios in Los Angeles, marking the band's first project made entirely outside Chile.

The album marked a major stylistic shift from Los Prisioneros' earlier politicized new wave and guitar-driven rock toward a more polished synth-pop and dance-pop sound incorporating house and electro-disco elements. Primary songwriter Jorge González took greater creative control after guitarist Claudio Narea left the band during the sessions due to personal tensions (including González's relationship with Narea's wife) and disagreements over the new electronic direction. Corazones achieved strong commercial success in Chile, selling approximately 180,000–190,000 copies and earning triple to quadruple platinum certifications, with momentum boosted by the MTV Latin America rotation of the lead single "Tren al Sur". Retrospectively, it is widely regarded as the band's magnum opus and a landmark in Chilean and Latin American rock, ranking No. 9 on Rolling Stone Chile's list of the 50 best Chilean albums (2008) and No. 23 on Rolling Stone magazine's list of the 50 best Latin American rock albums (2023). It has been praised for capturing the cultural mood of early post-Pinochet Chile and for influencing later artists such as Javiera Mena.

== Background ==
Following the release of their third studio album, La cultura de la basura (1987), Los Prisioneros had solidified their reputation as one of Chile's leading rock bands with a politicized new wave sound. By 1989, as Chile transitioned out of Augusto Pinochet's dictatorship, the group began exploring a more personal and sonically adventurous direction that moved away from guitar-driven protest rock toward intimate lyrics and electronic elements.

Between July and August 1989, the band held pre-production sessions at Konstantinopla Studios (known as "Beaucheff 1435" after primary songwriter Jorge González's home address). These sessions produced the majority of the album's material, featuring melancholic melodies, more intimate lyrics, and dance-oriented tracks driven by synthesizers and programmed drums. Early ideas for songs such as "En forma de pez", "Ella espera", and "Las sierras eléctricas" were developed during this period; some later appeared on the 1996 compilation Ni Por La Razón, Ni Por La Fuerza, while others circulated unofficially among fans.

Tensions within the band intensified during this time. Guitarist Claudio Narea gradually distanced himself as his role as guitarist and occasional songwriter diminished while González pushed for a synth-pop and house-influenced sound. Narea ultimately left during the early production stages due to both musical disagreements over the new electronic direction and personal conflicts, including González's relationship with Narea's wife — themes that later surfaced in the album's lyrics. In October 1989, González traveled to Los Angeles with only the band's manager, Carlos Fonseca (other members faced visa issues), to begin formal recording. The group chose Argentine producer Gustavo Santaolalla, known for his work with Arco Iris, Wet Picnic, and León Gieco. Santaolalla brought a new level of polish that previous González-produced albums had lacked, blending jagged electronic melodies with soaring pop arrangements and incorporating regional instruments such as the charango to create a distinctly Latin American sonic identity.

== Artwork ==
The album cover was photographed by Alejandro Barruel and designed by Vicente "Vicho" Vargas, The cover shows González wearing a white shirt with blood on the heart, however the bloodstain is on the opposite side of, this error was not corrected until the 1995 edition. The shirt used was purchased by manager Carlos Fonseca for the photo in a Paris store, located on Lyon venue. "We just knew that Claudio had left. It was very strange to take photos without him", recalled Fonseca.

== Recording and production ==
Formal recording sessions for Corazones took place in late 1989 and early 1990 at Entourage Studios and Mad Dog Studios in Los Angeles, California. The pre-production demos recorded at Beaucheff 1435 in Chile were taken to Los Angeles by Jorge González and manager Carlos Fonseca; bassist Miguel Tapia was unable to obtain a U.S. visa, and guitarist Claudio Narea had already departed the band.

Argentine producer Gustavo Santaolalla (with associate producer Aníbal Kerpel) oversaw the sessions. Santaolalla, who had previously worked with bands such as Arco Iris and León Gieco, brought a significantly higher level of polish than González's self-produced earlier albums. He incorporated traditional Latin American instrumentation, most notably playing the charango himself on the lead single "Tren al Sur", and helped blend the band's new electronic and house influences with soaring pop arrangements. Engineering was handled by Don Tittle at the Los Angeles studios, with mixing by Tony Peluso at The Enterprise Studios and mastering by Mike Rees at A&M Studios.

The recording process occurred amid the band's recent internal tensions. With Narea absent, González assumed primary creative control, and the sessions focused on refining the synth-pop and dance-pop direction first explored in the Beaucheff 1435 demos. The move to professional U.S. studios represented a deliberate step toward an international production standard, funded by EMI as the band was considered a priority act for the Latin American market.

== Release ==
Corazones was released on May 20, 1990 on the EMI label. The album sold over 190,000 copies, and was certified with four platinum records. It stands today as one of the best selling albums in Chile. Its first single, "Tren al Sur", was released on May 7, 1990, prior to the album’s official release.

== Reception ==
In 1990, Jorge was chosen as the composer of the year by the Chilean Copyright Society. In 2006 was chosen as the best Ibero-American rock album No. 54 by Al Borde, and in 2008 as the ninth best Chilean album by Rolling Stone.

== Legacy and influence ==
Some of the album tracks were covered by some singers like: "Amiga mía", covered by Javiera Mena for the 2012 movie Joven y Alocada, Fakuta, covered the song "Cuentame una historia original". Produced by Vicente Sanfuentes and Lego Mustache, the song "Estrechez de corazón" was covered by Carlos Cabezas, Francisca Valenzuela, and the group Villa Cariño. Being recorded in Triana studios by the famous engineer Gonzalo González, with a music video directed by Felipe Foncea. In the tribute album to Jorge González, "Nada es para Siempre", the musicians Gepe and Javiera Mena, accompanied by Cecilia Aguayo, Uwe Schmidt, Felipe Carbone, and Gonzalo Yáñez performed a version of "Cuentame una historia original". In 2020 David Eidelstein, the bassist of Los Tetas known as "Rulo", covered the song "Estrechez de corazón".

== Track listing ==
All tracks are written by Jorge González.

Side one
No.	Title	Length
1.	"Tren al sur"	5:34
2.	"Amiga mía"	4:01
3.	"Con suavidad"	5:03
4.	"Corazones rojos"	3:31
5.	"Cuéntame una historia original"	3:47

Side two
No.	Title	Length
1.	"Estrechez de corazón"	6:22
2.	"Por amarte"	6:02
3.	"Noche en la ciudad (fiesta!)"	6:09
4.	"Es demasiado triste"	4:50
Total length:		45:19

== Personnel ==
Adapted from the album's liner notes.

Production

- Gustavo Santaolalla – producer
- Aníbal Kerpel – associate producer
- Don Tittle – engineer (at Entourage and Mad Dog Studios, LA)
- Tony Peluso – mixing engineer (at The Enterprise Studios, LA)
- Joel Stoner – assistant engineer (at The Enterprise Studios, LA)
- Mike Rees – mastering (at A&M Studios, LA)
- Carlos Fonseca – executive production
- Vicente Vargas – graphic design
- Alejandro Barruel – photography
