= Los Prisioneros =

Chilean rock band

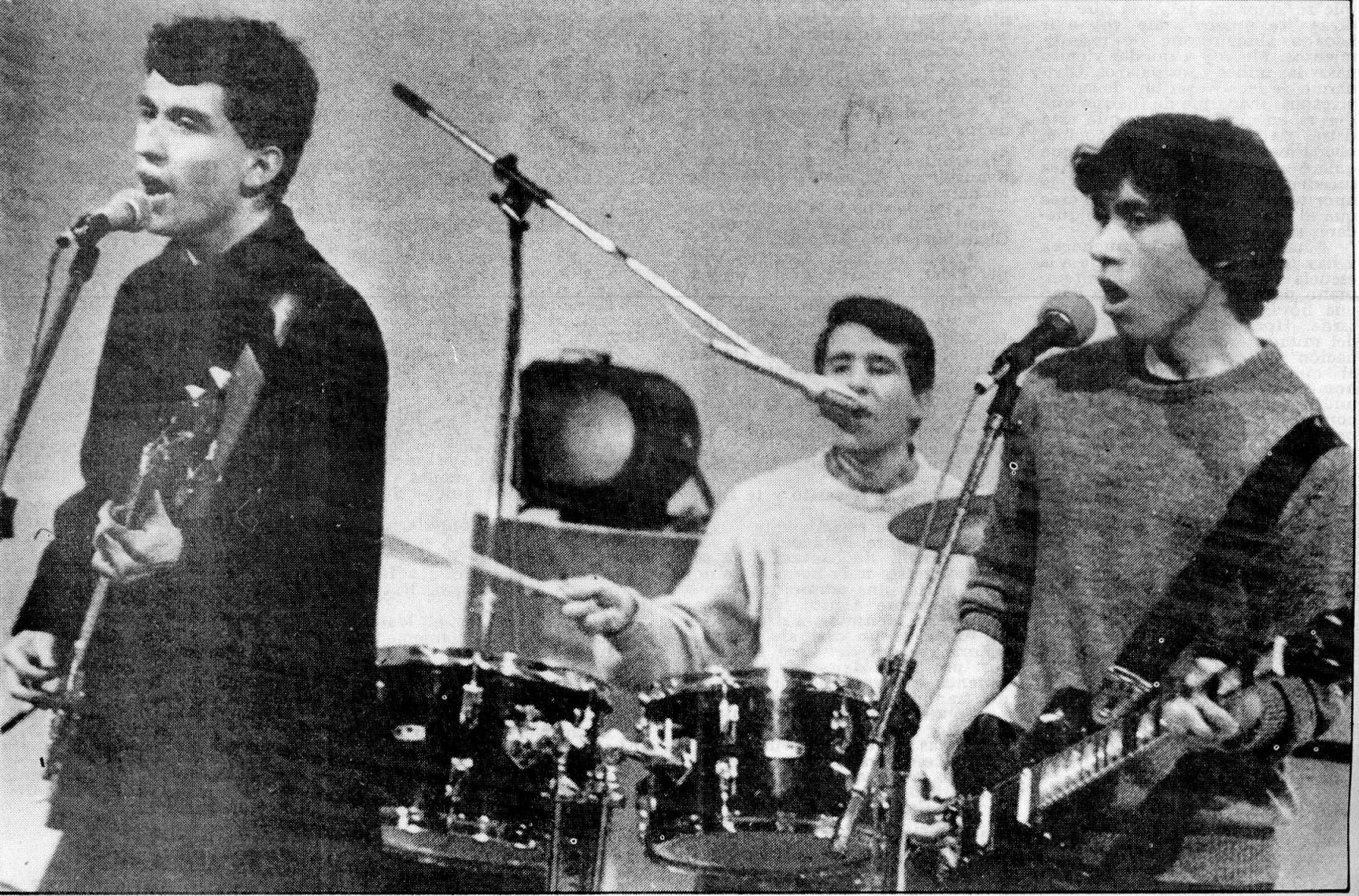
- Los Prisioneros in 1987. From left to right: Jorge González, Miguel Tapia, and Claudio Narea.

Background information
- Also known as: Los Vinchukas, Gus Gusano y sus Necrofílicos Hemofílicos, Los Apestosos
- Origin: San Miguel, Santiago Metropolitan Region, Chile
- Genres: New wave; synthpop; punk rock; rockabilly; ska
- Years active: 1982–1992, 2001–2006
- Labels: Fusión, EMI-Odeon, Capitol, Warner Music
- Spinoffs: Narea y Tapia
- Past members: Jorge González Ríos; Miguel Tapia; Claudio Narea; Robert Rodríguez; Cecilia Aguayo; Álvaro Henríquez; Sergio "Coti" Badilla; Gonzalo Yáñez
- Website: planetaprisionero.cl

Los Prisioneros ("The Prisoners") was a Chilean rock band formed in San Miguel, Santiago, in 1982. Considered one of the most influential Latin-American bands of all time, they've been evaluated as pioneers of Rock en español (Rock in Spanish) by Latin American media and musicians, and one of the strongest socio-political impactful bands in Chile. The group developed a new wave sound that had its roots in British punk rock, in particular the Clash, and incorporated rockabilly, reggae and ska influences, and later synthpop. They became known for their controversial, witty and subversive lyricism that criticized the socio-economic structures, education and societal attitudes of dictatorship-era Chile and Latin America as a whole. This would cause their music to be banned by the Chilean mainstream media between 1985 and 1990, but their music would continue to spread there, aided by word of mouth and shared homemade cassette tapes.

The band initially met in high school, studying at San Miguel's Liceo 6, and formed as "Los Vinchukas" (a play on the Beatles, one of their biggest influences), with Miguel Tapia on the drums, Claudio Narea on guitar and Jorge González serving as their lead vocalist, bassist, main songwriter and de-facto leader. After changing their name to Los Prisioneros, they recorded their first album, La voz de los '80, and released it on the independent record label Fusión Producciones. It initially struggled to achieve mainstream popularity before signing to EMI Records in 1985 and re-releasing their first album on vinyl records and cassettes. Throughout the 1980s, the band saw an increased popularity in Latin America, in particular in Chile and Peru.

Starting with the release of 1986's Pateando piedras and 1987's La cultura de la basura, González began to experiment with synth pop, influenced by the growing popularity of Depeche Mode. Tensions between González and Narea escalated during the production of their 1990 album Corazones, when Narea learned of an affair between González and his wife and left the band, being replaced by Cecilia Aguayo on keyboards, and Robert Rodríguez on bass. The quartet remained active for two years before disbanding in 1992.

Following the release of the compilation album Antologia, su historia y sus exitos, Los Prisioneros reunited in 2001, and played two reunion shows in Santiago's Estadio Nacional to a total of almost 150,000 people, the largest Chilean concert at the time. They recorded a self-titled reunion album in 2003, but Narea left the band shortly after due to heightened tensions with the group. Los Tres frontman Alvaro Henríquez later joined the band, recording the cover album Los Prisioneros En Las Raras Tocatas Nuevas De la Rock & Pop. Shortly after, Sergio "Coty" Badilla and Gonzalo Yáñez joined the band, and would form part of the lineup that would record their sixth and final studio album, Manzana, and would go on tour in Canada, the United States, Mexico, Ecuador, Peru, Bolivia, Colombia, and Chile. On 18 February 2006, in Caracas, Venezuela, the band performed their last concert.

Musically, Los Prisioneros marked the beginning of a new musical era in Chile, leaving behind the 1960s folk-inspired music of Víctor Jara and Violeta Parra, and starting the new era of Nuevo Pop Chileno (New Chilean Pop)., setting the stage for many other Chilean bands, such as Aparato Raro, Cinema, Upa!, Valija Diplomática, Aterrizaje Forzoso, Electrodomésticos, Banda 69, Fulano, among others. Songs like "La Voz de los '80", "Muevan las Industrias", and "Tren al Sur" are among the most famous, important, and musically influential songs of Latin America, and the song "El baile de los que sobran" became an anthem for the 2019-2022 Chilean protests. In 2023, Rolling Stone would name Corazones among the 50 best Latin-American albums of all time.

== History ==
=== Formation and early years ===
In 1979, songwriter Jorge González (bass, lead vocals), Miguel Tapia (drums, backing vocals) and Claudio Narea (guitar, backing vocals), met during their first year of High school or Secondary school as it is known in Chile. They attended The «Liceo Number 6 from San Miguel, Santiago de Chile. Their high school has since been renamed Liceo Andres Bello. In 1980, Jorge and Claudio, along with brothers Rodrigo and Alvaro Beltran, formed the band "The Pseudopillos" (the Pseudo-thieves). The group created humorous songs a cappella (mostly by Jorge and Claudio), using everyday objects as percussion.

Simultaneously, Jorge had a band with Miguel, where they would pretend to be John Lennon and Paul McCartney from the Beatles. After watching them play; Narea nicknamed them "Los Vinchukas"."Vinchukas" are small insects of northern Chile; this nickname inferred that the Jorge and Miguel were «The Chilean Beatles». As they all got to know each other, they eventually invited Narea to join the band . Shortly after Alvaro Beltran joined on guitar, and Miguel Tapia, who had received a drum set as a gift from one of his sisters, took over the drums. .

The quartet made its live debut on 14 May 1982, at their High School and had moderate success. At the end of 1982 Jorge and Miguel wanted to buy a bass drum pedal, but Claudio and Alvaro disagreed with them. Rodrigo, who was not part of the band, intervened causing the dissolution of Los Vinchukas and Los Pseudopillos a few days after graduating high school. Gonzalez and Tapia continued playing together, but Claudio did not speak to them for two or three months while working to raise money for college. Rodrigo, who had reconciled with Jorge and Miguel, convinced Claudio to return to the band. At this critical phase, the band decided to use a brand new name, this time seriously. First they chose Los Criminales ("the Criminals") reflecting their views as being outsiders, but Miguel suggested the name Los Prisioneros reflecting more accurately their reality in the authoritarian repressed Chile of the 1980s . The rest liked the name, and on 1 July 1983, they debuted with the name Los Prisioneros at Festival de la Canción del Colegio Miguel León Prado (Miguel Leon Prado High School Song festival). At that time the band members were Jorge González as bass player and lead singer, Claudio Narea on the guitar and Miguel Tapia playing drums, percussions and backing vocals. That same year, Jorge González entered the University of Chile School of Arts, where he met several people whom -although unknown at the time- would become stars of the "Nuevo Pop Chileno" (New Chilean Pop). Singers such as Igor Rodríguez —who would eventually become a member of the band "Aparato Raro"— and future members of Los Prisioneros Robert Rodríguez and Carlos Fonseca with whom he established an instant friendship. It was not long before Jorge Gonzalez y Carlos Fonseca dropped out of the university. Shortly afterwards, Jorge González began to work at the Fonseca's family business (a record store called Discos Fusión), while Carlos Fonseca went out looking for new talent. Some time later Jorge asked Carlos Fonseca to be the manager of the band.

"...We ended up third out of three, and they even tried to charge us admission to see the rest of the show. In any case, when we got there to rehearse, and we thought we were so cool, because we were real, with songs which were unknown but were our own. The others only did versions of already famous People. I remember that we performed as the opening number."

In 1983 Claudio Narea also entered the USACH to study engineering. There Narea also met Igor Rodriguez (Aparato Raro), and Robert Rodriguez (who would eventually become the lead of Banda 69). It was not long before Claudio Narea drops out of college as well (none of them had expected him to do that). While Carlos Fonseca focused on his radio program at "Radio Beethoven" (a Chilean Radio station that played only classical music), he was also planning to make a special year-end show with emerging Chilean talents. Jorge brought a song he recorded in a dual cassette radio at home, and also the live performance of the band at their school.

Throuroughly amazed after hearing the performances, Carlos convinced his father —Mario Fonseca— that the band had projection and future, and he in turn decided to invest money in the band. At a later date, Jorge Gonzalez then introduced Narea and Tapia to Fonseca. When Carlos saw that Claudio was not a guitar virtuoso, he talked with Jorge and Miguel about replacing him, however, Gonzalez and Tapia refused to replace Narea because; as Jorge Said:

"Los Prisioneros, were the three of them together"

Carlos became the manager of the group and got them to record their first demos (which he would later play in his radio show, Fusión Contemporánea ["Contemporary fusion"]) in late 1983 he got them to play around Santiago, Chile. Carlos also wrote an article about the band in the Dinners Club World magazine under a pseudonym.

=== 1984–1985: La Voz De Los '80 ===
On 13 December 1984, their first album titled La voz de los '80 ("The Voice of the '80s") was released under the label "Fusion", which was property of the Fonseca Family. The album hardly received any radio airplay, but became emblematic in the Chilean music scene later on. During that time, Chilean Radio and Television mostly favored Argentinian artists, so their exposure was limited to "Radio Galaxia", Sábado Gigante and "Canal 11" (Chilean TV Station). They also played at the "Sexta Teleton" (the Sixth Telethon) and suffered their first act censorship while performing the first single of La voz de los '80. According to Claudio Narea, the Televisión Nacional de Chile (Chilean National Television), controlled by the Military Government at the time, cut the teleton signal and broadcast commercials instead of their performance. It was then that the Chilean Military Government singled them out as potentially dangerous to the stability of the regime of Augusto Pinochet. During August 1985, they signed a contract deal with EMI. In October of that year, their album was re-released in all of Chile and they sold between 100,000 and 105,000 copies; placing them among the most popular and best selling albums in Chile. According to the Chilean Magazine Vea, the band's Song "Sexo" was the most played by Chilean radio. EMI records would edit all their albums until 2001.

=== 1986: Commercial success and Pateando Piedras ===
On 15 September 1986, their second studio album titled Pateando piedras was released under the EMI label. Highlights from this album are "¿Por qué no se van?", "Muevan las industrias" and especially "El Baile de los que sobran", considered a classic of the genre and remembered in much of Latin America.

"...Under our shoes, mud plus concrete

The future is nothing like what was promised during those twelve games (referencing grades 1 through 12 of education)

Others learned secrets we weren't told

Others were truly given that thing we call "education"

They asked us for effort, they asked us for dedication

And for what?! So that we could end up dancing and kicking stones!

English translation of Baile De Los Que Sobran (Dance Of The Ones Left Behind).

The album sold five thousand copies in the first ten days of release, an exploit that was never done before by a young band in Chile. In two months and two days after the album's release, it achieved platinum status. Two months after the launch of its second album in November 1986, the band played at Estadio Chile in front of eleven thousand people. They were considered "The hope in Viña" by the public at the National Stadium Chile. At the International Song Festival of Vina del Mar in 1987, the band was not in the official program, something that baffled fans and the media. Instead, there were other groups present at the bill, such as 24 Upa!, Cinema, Argentine rock group Soda Stereo and GIT (the latter band being the most popular at the event). The trio from San Miguel expressed their rejection of Soda Stereo during interviews.

In November 1986 they were invited to perform at the international Rock Festival of Montevideo in Uruguay where they shared stage with Soda Stereo, Fito Paez, GIT, Sumo, among others. The band released their albums in that country but with little success so they never went back. In March 1987 they played at the Chateau Rock Festival at Estadio Cordoba and Buenos Aires Works, Argentina, although it seemed only half the audience liked them, while Argentine media just asked them questions about Pinochet in the press conferences that they attended. It was a completely different story in Peru where the group was a success, they had three songs in the top ten, «El baile de los que sobran» took first place for six consecutive weeks. They achieved similar success in Bolivia, Ecuador and Colombia.

In Peru Los Prisioneros held their most famous concert on 19 September 1987 at the bullring Plaza de toros de Acho.

=== 1987–1988: La Cultura de la Basura Album and support of The "NO" Campaign ===
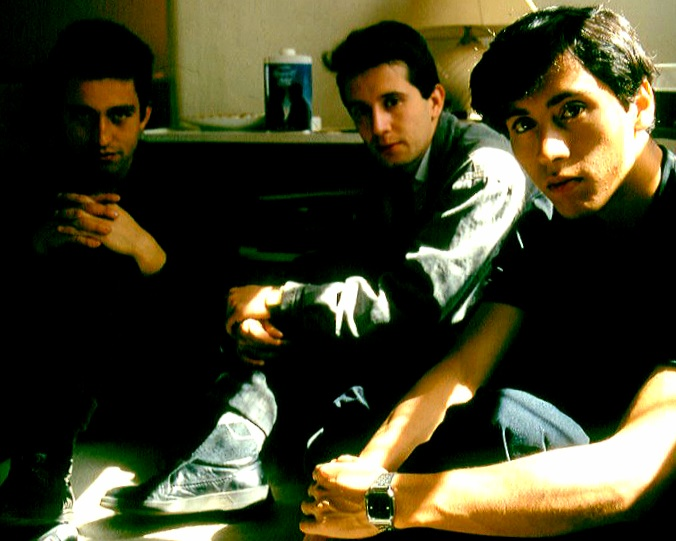
Los Prisioneros in 1987.

In October 1987 they started recording their third album La cultura de la basura (Culture of Garbage or Junk Culture). Jorge González promised the other band members they would all write together. As it turned out Gonzalez wrote the album by himself while Narea and Tapia composed four songs together: "Somos solo ruido" (We Are Only Noise), "Algo Tan Moderno" (Something So Modern), "El Vals" (The Waltz) and "Lo estamos pasando muy bien" (We Are Having A Good Time). During those sessions, the first disagreements within the band began. Caco Lyon could not stand Jorge's apathy and nonchalance, and left the recording sessions. Thus leaving the job to his assistant Antonio Gildemeister, who was an amateur in training. He was left to make the recordings and mixing, resulting in the roughness and crudeness of the album's final sound. Lyon later would say that the record was very messy and not properly filled. The album was released on 3 December of that year. They sold 10,000 copies in advance sales, but did not surpass the success of Pateando piedras, being only able to sell 70 000 copies. This was considered by media critics as an artistic and commercial failure of the band although, ironically, it was still double platinum. For González, the album was neither a commercial, nor an artistic failure of the band; nevertheless, he considered it to be a low point for the band. Claudio, Fonseca, and Miguel blamed Jorge, saying that he got too relaxed because he was not the only one composing as it had been in the past.

Fonseca liked the song "Lo Estamos Pasando Muy Bien" (We Are having A Good Time) but he believed the other songs by Narea were similar to "Mostrar La Hilacha" (Showing Loose Thread) one of his other compositions. He added a new song, which opens the album, titled "We are Sudamerican rockers". This version of the album was released only in Chile. Today, it is considered by some the best album of the band (in the original edition) according to Juan Marquez of El Mercurio.

González and Fonseca had a heated argument over the choice of the first single, "Que No Destrocen Tu Vida" (Don't Let Them Destroy Your Life), a song about parents meddling in the lives of their sons. The song was probably inspired by Claudio's struggles with his parents. Gonzalez and Fonseca disagreed over which song was appropriate for Chilean radio circulation. Fonseca wanted "Maldito Sudaca" (Damn South American) as the single: a song about the racist attitudes of Spaniards toward South Americans; "Sudaca" is a racial slur used by Spaniards, which implies people from South America are inferior. In the end "Que No Destrocen Tu Vida" was chosen as the single, while "Maldito Sudaca" became much more popular in Chile and Latin America.

On 28 March 1988, Los Prisioneros called a press conference to explain the promotional tour for La Cultura de la Basura: 40 dates were announced from Arica, Chile's northernmost city to Punta Arenas, Chile's southernmost city. The tour later would also include other South American countries and Mexico. At the end of the press conference; Cristián Rodríguez—a former representative of the Independent Record Label Fusion who was invited by Miguel Tapia—asked about the last question on the plebiscite/referendum coming up in October of that year, concerning the military dictatorship of General Pinochet still ruling in Chile at the time. Jorge González answered immediately and without hesitation:

"In the upcoming plebiscite we will vote NO (En el plebiscito votaremos que No)"

This was a strong public statement against the Dictator of Chile Augusto Pinochet, and it caused much controversy. It resulted that out of the 40 scheduled dates, only 7 were possible to make without censorship.

Here the reference of "El Plebiscito" Consisted of 2 choices: "Yes" to continue with the Dictatorial Government of Augusto Pinochet or "NO" meaning to convocate national elections to choose a new president. This political referendum battle is known as the "NO" Campaign versus the "Yes" Campaign. The "NO" Campaign being the most popular and the victorious one; colloquially referred to in Chile simply as "El No" (The No).

After the plebiscite, the band returned to Argentina to participate in the commemoration of the 40 years of the Universal Declaration of Human Rights in a concert organized by Amnesty International, which had sought to make it in Chile, but was not able to due Pinochet's opposition. On 14 October 1988 in the World Cup Stadium in Mendoza, Los Prisioneros shared the stage with Sting, Peter Gabriel, Tracy Chapman, Bruce Springsteen, Youssou N'Dour, the Mendozino group Markama and Chilean Group Inti Illimani, performing together the song "Get Up, Stand Up" by Bob Marley to an audience between 10,000 and 18,000 Chileans and Argentinians.

Chilean people were happy to be outside their country. They felt liberated. But the experience was strange because we were not too comfortable in Argentina. There was always this tension between Argentinians and Chileans. We did not leave with a pleasant memory.

They started their tour in Colombia, Venezuela and Mexico, Colombia being the country where they had they made the greatest impact. They sustained three consecutive tours in September and November 1988 and April, all in Colombia. The song "Pa pa pa" was the top seller in Bogota; according to Mario Ruiz, manager of marketing for the Latin market EMI at the time, the Chilean group managed to open the Colombian market for Spanish rock.

After the tour was canceled in Venezuela, they went to Mexico, where they were a virtually unknown band with little exposure in the country, and the band's songs "¿Quien Mató a Marilyn?", "La voz de los 80" and "Muevan Las Industrias" were mainly played on non-commercial radio. Soon after they reached Mexico, Claudio contracted a case of hepatitis and had to return to Chile to rest, leaving the band to suspend their promotional tour in that country.

=== First hiatus (1990–2000) ===
==== 1989–1990: Narea's departure, Corazones and break-up ====
In June 1989, Jorge Gonzalez and Carlos Fonseca traveled to Los Angeles, US, to record what would become the band's fourth album Corazones produced by the Argentinian Gustavo Santaolalla. This was the first album in which Jorge was not also the producer; all other previous albums were produced almost exclusively by him. Narea and Tapia thought that they would participate composing like they did in the album The Culture of Garbage. They composed 3 songs; however, the songs by Narea and Tapia were left out of the album. The reason for this—Carlos Fonseca stated—was that according to the law Jorge González was "the composer of the group"; and because Tapia could not travel due to problems with his visa. The new album was a departure from what they had done in the past. It had a new sound: with Electronic music dominating the album; and with keyboard as the main instrument. In those days—the partnership of Jorge and Claudio was ending—not just professionally (Jorge was inclined to synthpop; and Narea to rock and roll and blues from the 50 and 60) but personally as well. In February 1989 Claudio found love letters for his wife (Claudia Carvajal) written by his best friend and bandleader Jorge Gonzalez. A whole year passed before Narea's decision to leave the band. After Narea's wife returned to him following a brief affair with Jorge Gonzalez. The Songs from the Album Corazones (Hearts) are mostly about romanticism, but also classism and male chauvinism. Claudio attributed Gonzalez's songs as being inspired by the affair with his wife. Finally, in January 1990 Claudio bitterly decided to withdraw from the band. When the album was unveiled in May of that year Claudio Narea stated:

"I decided to leave because I did not feel comfortable, to say the least. Everything was done for the approval and liking of Jorge, who for too long never considered at all my opinions nor those of Miguel's. It is time to walk away from lies. The Prisoners have been sham for a while. Only in the beginning, and shortly after Pateando Piedras, we were authentic—but after that—things began to change ..."

In 1990 the victory of the NO campaign, was ratified ending the Chilean military regime of Pinochet. Their albums were completely re-released in remastered compact disc formats, once Chile was no longer under a military regime. There was also talk of a new album and the departure of Claudio Narea. In an interview with Katherine Salosny, Jorge said he felt bad about the departure of Claudio Narea. The "Agenda Extra Jóvenes" featured the album's first single, "Tren al sur", and premiered the Video clip 17 of the Album. Later that year, Cecilia Aguayo (ex The Cleopatras) joined the group, Jorge told them that she was the newest member of Los Prisioneros, but she could not play any instrument, yet she left her medicine studies to devote herself to learn keyboard on a Casio Keyboard. She Rehearsed every day in her house and when her friends came to visit her, and asked why she always played Prisioneros songs, she responded because I really like them-Jorge told her not to tell anyone until she was officially introduced as a member of the group.

It took Eight months after its launch for the album Corazones to become successful; the album managed to sell 180,000 copies; and sold triple platinum in Chile. The Day after the new lineup debuted at the Festival of Viña del Mar Fonseca left his position as Manager. The album Corazones was their most praised work and the most critically acclaimed, it is believed that had Los Prisioneros began their group as they were at that time; they would have been able to win trophies, awards and thousands in sales, even if in the end they would have lost their historic significance. In Argentina, though they were never very popular, Jorge Gonzalez was paid author's rights—in places like Córdoba and Rosario, the album was a success. They also were able to sign with Capitol Records to release Corazones in the United States.

On 24 October 1990, Jorge and Miguel announce the dissolution of the group, and released a video and album titled "Los Prisioneros: Grandes Éxitos", which sold over 120,000 copies in Chile and 54,000 outside of Chile. They started their farewell tour which ended in the National Stadium Chile, At the end of the performance people started screaming—"Narea, Narea, Narea"—Jorge González responded by mocking the new band of former his teammate, referring to them as "Proxenetas y Flemáticos" but the public became increasingly insistent with "Narea, Narea, Narea", Jorge González could not bear it, he threw his guitar down and ran into the dressing rooms crying. The last concert of Los Prisioneros was at that time was in Valparaíso, Chile in 1992.

Throughout the decade of the 1990s, their music spread out, reaching all of South and Central America as well as some parts of the United States, Canada and Europe. On 1 October 1993, the MTV Latin American made his debut using the music video for "We Are Sudamerican Rockers" by Los Prisioneros.

==== Ni Por La Razón, Ni Por La Fuerza, Trio Los Dioses and El Caset Pirata ====
In 1996 Los Prisioneros were seen again after several years, and started collecting the band's success, and unreleased songs, covers of some songs released abroad discarded songs, with more oddities from the time of Los Pseudopillos, Los Vinchukas, Gus Gusano y Los Apestosos. They created a compilation which sold 100.000 albums dobles.54Later, 40 songs were selected and featured in a double compact disc compilation album titled,Ni Por La Razón, Ni Por La Fuerza (Nor by reason, Nor by force). Its cover shows the faces of Jorge González, Miguel Tapia and Claudio Narea above the face of Bernardo O'Higgins, Jose Miguel Carrera and Manuel Rodríguez, considered the Fathers of the Chilean Homeland. The compilation album was promoted through the radios with the song "Las sierras Eléctricas", a song originally written and composed for the album Corazones, in 2001 a new version of This song was used to announce the reunion of the group in two shows of the National Stadium. They played privately in one event, in Balmaceda 1215, however, there was no talk about getting back together, nor the media showed any interest with the news, this album was re-released in others formats like; in 2012 when the compilation album was released on Vinyl.

In 1998 Jorge and Miguel were reunited, along with the Venezuelan artist Argenis Brito, to form the trio "Los Dioses" (The Gods), they launched a tour titled "Lo Mejor de Los Prisioneros" (The Best of The Prisoners) and toured Chile and Peru, interpreting classics of the prisoners, and did some gigs not but were not very successful. Gonzalez's aggressiveness and carelessness in front of his audiences pushed the public away. One Day Jorge collapsed due to his addiction to drugs and finally left the trio in March 1999, without releasing an album. Argenis Brito Miguel and continued together under as a duo under the new name "Humanitarian Reason". In 2000 Jorge suddenly stopped promoting his latest solo album, and he traveled to Cuba, to overcome his drug addiction in the Villa Center Detoxification Quinque in that country.

In October 2000 Carlos Fonseca released under the label Warner Music, the tribute album Tributo a Los Prisioneross, made up of 18 groups in Chile, with Jorge González doing Chorus vocals. Tributing bands included Glup!, Javiera y Los Imposibles, Lucybell, Los Tetas and La Ley. A month later, and produced by Jorge Gonzalez El Caset Pirata and the compilation of hits from the band recorded live from 1986 to 1991.57 40 As an advance, they released a single before the album's release on 30 October, titled "No necesitamos banderas"(We Don't Need Flags), a presentation of the 1992 farewell tour banda. the album sold 20 000 copies. On 31 August 2011, it was re-released along with the other 3 albums La cultura de la basura, Pateando piedras and La voz de los '80.

=== 2003: Original lineup reunion ===
In 2003 the band released their first new album since Claudio Narea left the band in 1990. It was titled self-titled, Los Prisioneros. The reviews for the album were quite mixed, some loved it while others did not or thought that the band no longer sounded like Los Prisioneros. The album had a whole new sound, but it kept the political lyrics of the band in most of their songs. Basically the first half of the album is very centered in the rock genre while the second half moves into more of an electronic and acoustic folk guitar influence. They made two videos for the album, one for "San Miguel" and one for "Ultra-Derecha". They then began a tour to promote the album in 2003.

The same year, Los Prisioneros played in the famous music festival of Viña Del Mar in Chile. This was a live broadcast show and a very controversial one. Jorge González changed or added lyrics expressing his anger towards George W. Bush, about the Iraq and Afghanistan invasions, and other major things happening in Chile. By this time, Jorge was becoming very outspoken which caused controversy, and tension began to become quite noticeable between Jorge and Claudio.

In September, Claudio Narea was dismissed by the band, the remaining members said they talked it out like gentlemen, and decided to keep the reason of his dismissal between the three, and then until the band's final break up in 2006, Los Prisioneros would face on and off controversy from certain newspapers and sometimes even from Claudio. During a press conference to announce Claudio's departure, and to announce his replacement, who was called "the guest of honor in the guitar", the press kept bringing the subject of Claudio's departure. The Band members became annoyed and told several of the press members that they would not give any details regarding the breakup between Los Prisioneros and Claudio and would refuse talk about it. Eventually, Jorge lost his temper and knocked down all the microphones and threw a glass jar of water (which was on the table) to the ground, then he left the conference and so did Miguel and "the guest of honor in the guitar, who was Álvaro Henríquez. The latter one left with a big smile on his face and waved goodbye.

=== New formation and first cover album ===
Los Prisioneros went into the Rock & Pop studios to record their live studio covers album with guest musician Álvaro Henríquez, of Los Tres fame. The album En Las Raras Tocatas Nuevas De La Rock & Pop features only two original Los Prisioneros songs while the rest are but covers. Some of the covers include "Es La Lluvia Que Cae" originally by the Rokes, "Birthday" by the Beatles, "Alone Again (naturally)" by Gilbert O'Sullivan and many others. In this album they record songs by other bands like Virus and the children's miniseries 31 Minutos. They also make new versions of 2 songs from their previous albums ("Concepción" and "En el cementerio"). The album had a limited production and is now a hard-to-find collector's item.

=== Reunion, tours, disco and second break up (2001–2003) ===
On 5 September 2001, the original lineup of The Prisoners was to officially launch the return of the group with a single. It was a new version of "Las sierras eléctricas" recorded for the occasion after 12 years, this song was originally recorded by the trio before Narea output Hearts in 1989 and was published posthumously, "Ni por la razon, Ni Por La fuerza" (Not by reason, Nor by Force) The same year EMI edited the double album Antologia, Su Historia Y Sus Exitos (Anthology, its history and successes), although similar to other Large successes, the first album is full they decided to remove the last album, which only lasted 55 minutes. The label had contractual problems, because they could not edit a record without the consent of the band as they had to accommodate their wishes. Also included, in its original version, "Las sierras eléctricas" that was not owned by EMI. Later that same year, the original band members, González, Tapia and Narea, meet again to perform two concerts at the National Stadium in Santiago on 30 November and December, with a great acclaim and press coverage, which the musicians had never had that up until that point. They appeared in several front pages of newspapers, and there was such a congregation and emotional reunion. Los Prisioneros became the first and so far the only group to fill twice the National Stadium, a record surpassed in 2007 by Soda Stereo to exceed 126 000 tickets sold in two dates, with the tour "will see me back again".

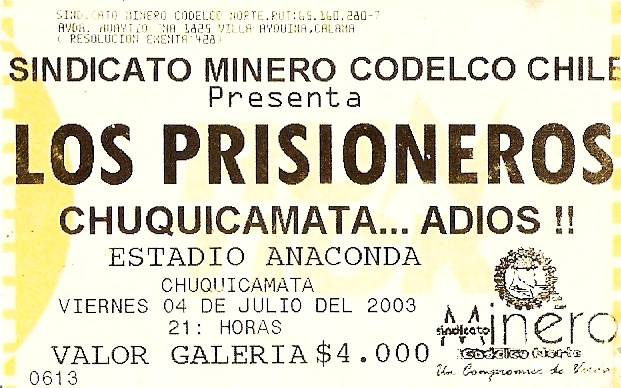
Entrance concert prisoners in Chuquicamata

In 2002 they recorded this memorable performance in a live album and DVD, while the band did a successful tour through Chile and various countries in Latin America. It is at this time the band started to create small controversy for Jorge Gonzalez remarks while performing. In Peru, González said he was ashamed of the "Anti-Peruvian attitudes" of his fellow Chilean countrymen. Then, as in the case of the 2002 Teleton, where González made sarcastic comments about the companies associated with the event, accusing them of using the Teleton for their own benefit, turning it into a business. Until this day, those events are well remembered and talked about.

In February 2003, they had a strong and successful time at the Festival of Viña del Mar festival winning all the awards and in June 2003, Los Prisioneros released to the market a new album (the fifth of their career) simply titled Los Prisioneros. Although it was far away from the band's original sound. Things that made the band famous, the social critique and anti-neoliberal policy was not absent. The album achieved gold and platinum, and "Untra Derecha" ultra-right and San Miguel are the themes that emerged as singles. Some months later, yet again Claudio Narea is leaving Los Prisoners this time the reasons for his departure are published on the band's website.

This dismissal was communicated to me on 18 August, as part of a meeting, to which I was summoned by George and Michael. Without dialogue nor discussion, Jorge González simply informed me that "we do not want to play with you anymore." Jorge accused me of wanting to outshine the band, and accused me of discussing problems within the band with friends who are outside the band. He was particularly upset by an interview in June, with the newspaper Las Ultimas Noticias, despite the fact that the interview was about my own personal matters and did not reveal any misfeasance about the band.

Tapia and González keep playing together with guest musicians. The big surprise was the temporary admission into the band of Álvaro Henríquez «formerly from Los Tres Band and from "Los Pettinellis" band (Chilean Rock Bands)»; with whom he recorded the album of covers and re-releases: Los Prisioneros En Las Raras Tocatas Nuevas De la Rock & Pop (The Prisoners In The New Strange Playings of Rock & Pop), recorded at the same radio Station.

On 23 October the prisoners were nominated as "Best Central Artist" by MTV Latin America, 64 who commemorated its ten years of existence and it was the band's second award, which is why they put together the supergroup, "Los Black Stripes" for the opening, with different exponents of Latin rock, including Jorge González, who shared the stage with the likes of Charly Alberti and Juanes. Then Alex Lora (El Tri) started singing "We are Sudamerican rockers", then joined with Jonaz and Rosso (Plastilina Mosh members), following them, González appeared singing "Bolero Falaz" (false Bolero) "by the Aterciopelados and then shouted "Viva Cuba". Jorge González later proceed to criticize MTV's new line up, saying that at first, MTV was oriented to true rock but today, the television station had become a sellout channel like all the other ones with a reality show, with Ricky Martin and Alejandro Sanz.

=== Re-awakened popularity and Manzana ===
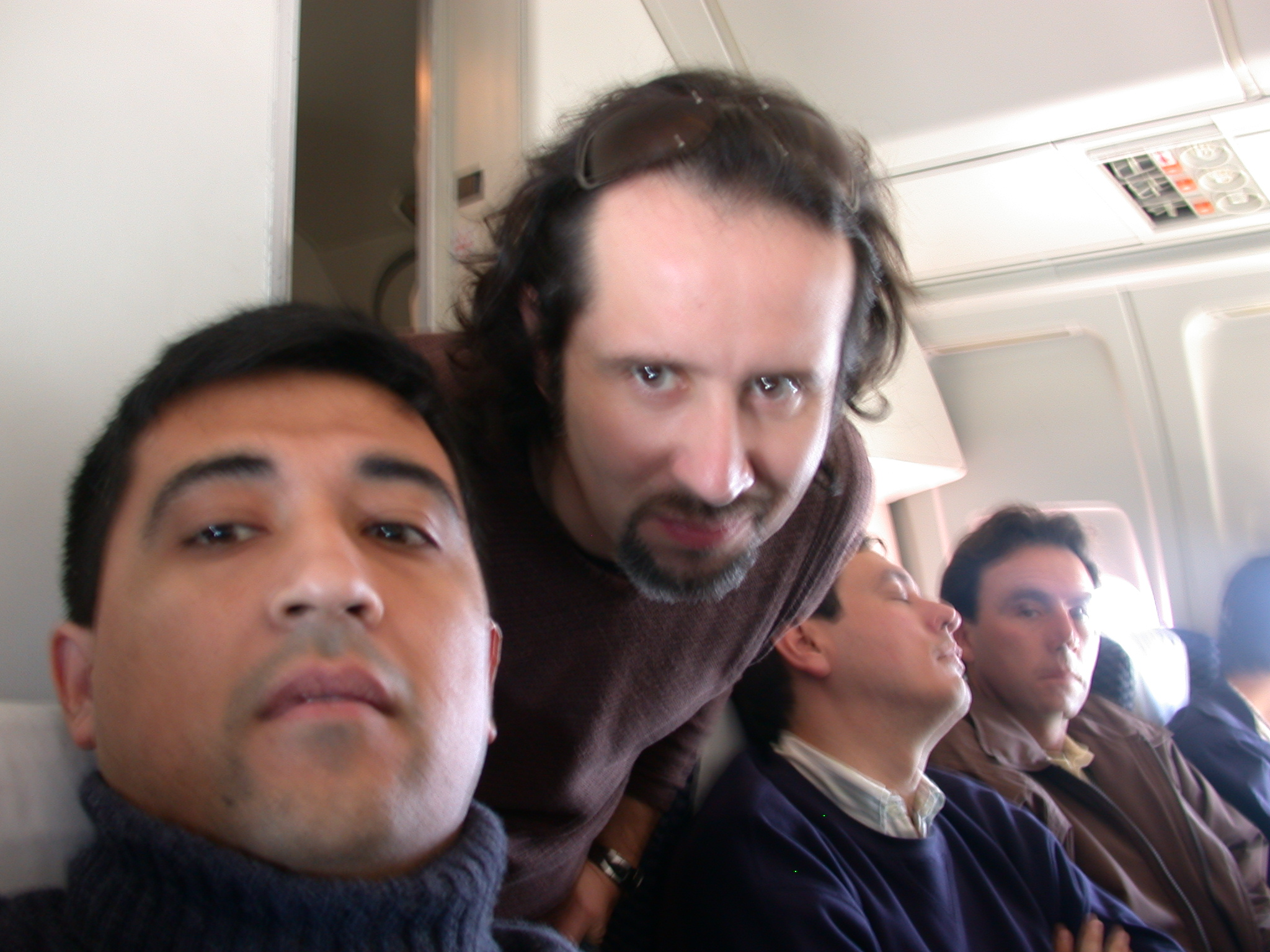
Miguel Tapia (middle) on a plane bound for a fan Iquique in 2004.

In 2004, a new line-up with Gonzalo Yáñez (as guest musician) and Sergio "Coti" Badilla, released their new album called Manzana. The album received great reviews, and sales, even though Jorge had said it would be hard to promote the album. The album featured a far more pop rock influence than the previous album. The album sounds as if Los Prisioneros were somehow realizing their roots and in some of the songs, it is evident of past Los Prisioneros albums that came out in the 1980s. While the album has a lot of electronic synths and in general electronic influence, each song pretty much stayed in the Rock genre. Their lyrics were a lot more up front than their previous album.

They specifically attacked El Mercurio in the song "Mr. Right" about how that newspaper created propaganda against Allende and hinted that the Chilean coup of 1973 where Chile's then president (Salvador Allende) was mysteriously killed by (depending on the sources) himself or the army that Pinochet commanded. They made a video for "El Muro" and began a tour that same year to play in South and Central America, Mexico, the US and Canada. During the tours, two more videos followed, "Manzana" and "Eres Mi Hogar". By this time, the band members have privately agreed to dissolve the group around 2006 but officially they continue as a band, and they carry on as if everything is the same for the next 2 years. In late 2005, Jorge González the band's main vocalist agrees to an extensive interview by the noted Chilean Journalist and Writer "Emiliano Aguayo"; who in turn published a book titled Maldito Sudaca: conversaciones con Jorge González. This book stands as a biographical account of the life of Jorge González and of the band. In addition the book has the most comprehensive discographical investigation of Jorge González as a musician. On 18 February 2005, they performed their last concert at the time in Caracas, Venezuela. After having successfully performed in Canada, United States, Mexico, Ecuador, Peru, Bolivia, Colombia and Chile, over the past two years. The dissolving of the group was agreed upon long before; although their closest fans were already aware of it, the press not informed, They cited the reason for the break up on the fact that they were all living in different cities. While Jorge González had taken up residence in Mexico, Miguel Tapia and Sergio Badilla remained in Santiago.

=== Final concerts and official dissolution ===
In 2005, Gonzalo Yáñez left the band (he was only a guest guitarist) to continue on his next album as a solo artist. The band continued touring until the end of 2005, and Jorge González had relocated to Mexico, D.F. After a dismal tour in early 2006 (of dates which the band were in contract to perform) the band announced on their official website that the band would be over in March 2006. This proved to be true when Jorge announced his new group Los Updates which has seen a very well received first full-length album in Europe, Japan and the United States where he has had good reviews by the specialized media in music.

On the other hand, the differences between Claudio Narea and Miguel Tapia would keep them apart since 2003. They were brought together in 2009 forming a new project called "Narea and Tapia", performing several live shows. The group indicated that they were recording new songs and would published on 20 December 2010, for free download on the Internet.

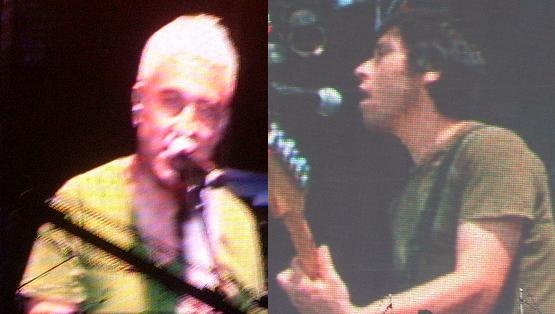
Two of the three original members of The Prisoners: Jorge Gonzalez-Claudio Narea each doing their own submission, in the Chilean Rock Summit II in 2009.

== Social and political legacy ==
According to several authors, Los Prisioneros became, by their lyrics contingency and social critics voicing the feelings and thoughts of thousands of young Chileans and Latin Americans in the 1980s. On 1 July 1983: Gonzalez, Tapia Narea for the first time called themselves "The Prisoners" (Los Prisioneros) and chose that as the name of their band, while on the other hand, on 11 May that same year, the first protest against Pinochet's regime was held, resulting in a chain of protests until 12 October 1984. Both movement's paths had crossed and "The Prisoners" unwittingly became the banner of struggle in the fact that they were being censored by the mainstream media, including the then state government network, Televisión Nacional de Chile (Channel 7), During the 1985 Telethon, as Prisoners made their appearance the government cut off the signal from the telethon and broadcast commercials instead. According to Narea, they detected something that could be dangerous to the stability of the government of General Pinochet, while Fonseca said the band's first album, La Voz de los '80 ("The Voice of the Eighties") made no direct attack on the Pinochet dictatorship neither did they ever sang a tribute to the slain Chilean president Salvador Allende.

Claudio Narea in his autobiography Mi Vida Como Prisionero (My life as a prisoner) wrote that "Los Prisioneros" leaned left politically:

"I remember when Jorge began to talk about socialism one day while we were walking in San Miguel. ... He said it would be the most fair, no one would starve to death and that life would be better for everyone when that system was implanted, and that it was certain that it would be implemented ... But in fact it was not so common to talk about politics within the band, because music was what filled us. We had no political prisoners in our families, and we did not go to protests. Although nevertheless, we began to detest Pinochet by observing the things that happened in those days, like the 'Caso Degollados' (Case of the Slit Throats), for example. Jorge Gonzalez has said many times that the lyrics were only a 'Stuffing' in the songs of 'Los Prisioneros'. But It was he who invented those songs. ... Our band will be remembered forever by those who lived through the dictatorship—Precisely because of that—because there was a dictatorship and people could basically do nothing except sing the songs of our band. I have no idea if the fame and popularity of the band would have been the same without the Milicos (military regime) but I have the feeling that no, it wouldn't have. I believe we belong to that period whether we like it or not".

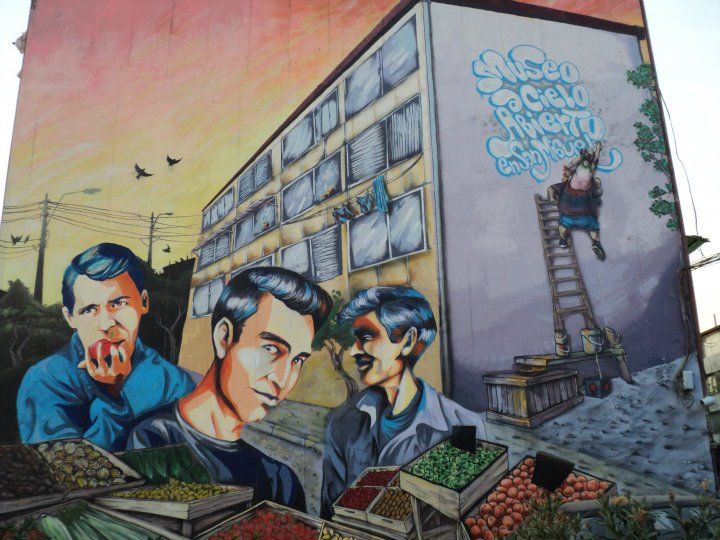
Mural in San Miguel in tribute to Los Prisioneros

In the 1980s, Jorge González, leader and principal songwriter of the band, said: "Los Prisioneros (The Prisoners) does not belong to any political party and we were not based on an ideological base nor an anti-establishment base ... it is that—after the songs are made— those things appear in the foreground. ... We only say what common people feel. Some people recriminate against a capitalist society—not because they had read Marx—but because the money they have is not enough to buy everything that the television teaches one needs to be happy. ... To say that we are anti-establishment sounds like propaganda. We don't recriminate against one person but against the whole system as such..." According to Carlos Fonseca: The vision they had for the trio of San Miguel is that they wanted to be a successful group, "That is why we did not dedicate lyrics to Chile. ... Now, over time, we realize that despite that, the people turned those songs into tools of their struggle against the dictatorship. That is why Jorge gets upset when asked about this, because he never felt he was doing protest songs".

== Musical style and influences ==
In the beginning it was a rejection of folk music, of canned foreign music and of well-connected people singing romantic music on the bathtub and on TV

— Jorge González

"Los Prisioneros" described their music as new wave. When they were in high school they listened to the Beatles, Kiss, Queen and the Bee Gees. However, it was the British punk rock band the Clash who influenced them the most, particularly in their beginning phase. According to Narea: "In 1981 we heard The Clash for the first time, through a 90-minute cassette that Claudio and Rodrigo Beltran just happened to record from a special radio concert. It featured the band's latest album at the time, titled Sandinista!. We were surprised by the diversity of sounds and beats from rock, to reggae, from jazz to even a bit of waltz added with humor, it was something so completely new for us..." Even Jorge Gonzalez declared Sandinista! his favorite album. The influence of the Clash was evident in Los Prisioneros albums such as La Voz De Los '80s ("The Voice of the 80s") and also in their album La Cultura De La Basura ("Trashy Culture"). They also influenced the lyrics and the look of the video clip "We are Sudamerican rockers." The wonder and appreciation they felt for the British band also led them to listen to other artists who cultivated the same genres, such as: the Specials, the Stranglers, Bob Marley, the Cars, Adam and the Ants, and Devo among others. Some critics have stated that Los Prisioneros were influenced by the Police but the group has emphatically denied this. According to the Chilean pop group Bambú, No necesitamos banderas was the first reggae album ever recorded in Chile.

In 1985, Jorge and Miguel were being influenced by the techno sound from groups such as Depeche Mode, Ultravox, New Order and Heaven 17. They were also influenced by new wave groups such as the Cure, as well as indie rock Groups like the Smiths and Aztec Camera. Jorge Gonzalez stated that Los Prisioneros were more a techno-pop group than a rock group. Ibeas Lalo, lead singer of the group Chancho en Piedra said, "it was too risky and brave for Los Prisioneros to have made their second album while radically changing the sound of the band. To shift from the sound of the guitars to the style of the Clash and from there to the synthesizers sound, and yet still being able to sound like themselves".

The band is classified as rock, Rock en Español, pop, folk, punk, post-punk, new wave, techno, electronic music, synthpop, and rockabilly. Also, influences of rock and roll, reggae, jazz, ska, rap, dance, vals, and experimental music.

== Band members ==
Principal members

- Jorge González – lead vocals, bass, guitars, keyboards, melodica (1983–1992, 2001–2006)
- Claudio Narea – guitars, keyboards, vocals (1983–1990, 2001–2003)
- Miguel Tapia – drums, percussion, keyboards, vocals (1983–1992, 2001–2006)

Other members

- Cecilia Aguayo – keyboards, percussion, backing vocals (1990–1992)
- Robert Rodriguez – bass, guitars, keyboards, backing vocals (1990–1992)
- Álvaro Henríquez – guitars, backing vocals (2003–2004)
- Sergio Badilla – keyboards, guitars (2003 live; 2004–2006)
- Gonzalo Yañez – guitars, backing vocals (2004–2006)

== Discography ==
- La voz de los '80 (1984)
- Pateando piedras (1986)
- La cultura de la basura (1987)
- Corazones (1990)
- Los Prisioneros (2003)
- Manzana (2004)

== Bibliography ==
- Narea, Claudio (2009). Mi vida como prisionero (1. ed.). Santiago, Chile: Grupo Ed. Norma. ISBN 9789563001860.
