= Jorge González (musician) =

Chilean musician (born 1964)

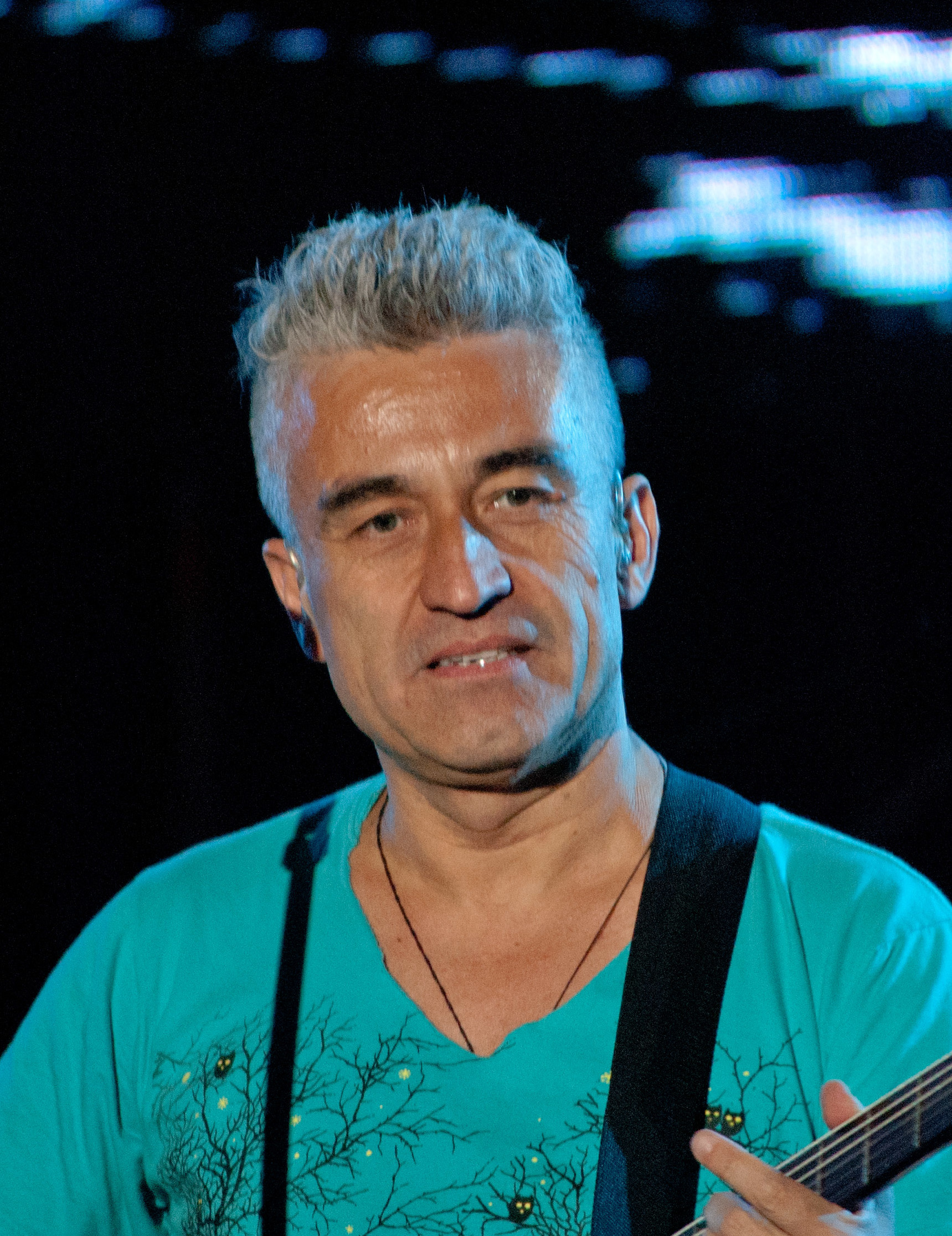
- González performing in 2012

Background information
- Born: Jorge Humberto González Ríos; 6 December 1964 (age 61); Santiago, Chile
- Genres: pop rock, new wave, alternative rock, synth pop, folk rock, punk rock, post-punk, ska, electronic
- Occupations: Singer-songwriter, multi-instrumentalist, producer
- Instruments: Vocals, bass guitar, guitar, keyboards
- Years active: 1982–present
- Labels: EMI; Alerce; Feria Music; Música y Entretenimiento
- Formerly of: Los Prisioneros; Los Updates

Jorge Humberto González Ríos (born 6 December 1964) is a Chilean singer-songwriter and producer, best known for being the leader, vocalist, songwriter and bass player of the post-punk band Los Prisioneros, considered by some to be among the most important Latin American bands of all time.

González rose to fame in the early 1980s when he formed Los Prisioneros with friends Claudio Narea and Miguel Tapia. The band quickly gained popularity for their socially conscious lyrics and energetic performances, blending punk, new wave, ska and pop influences, with the band becoming a symbol of resistance during Chile's military dictatorship. Los Prisioneros had recorded four studio albums before disbanding in 1992, where González would begin a solo career, with five albums to date. Los Prisioneros would reunite for two more studio albums in 2001 before disbanding yet again in 2006.

After the band's disbandment González formed with his wife the musical duo Los Updates in 2007, only to disband in 2011 after an extensive European tour. He would resume his solo career, when in February 2015, he collapsed mid-tour due to a cerebral vascular accident. After finishing his fifth solo album, he would announce his retirement from live performances in 2016 and spend the next few years recovering before releasing his sixth studio album in 2018.

== Musical biography ==
=== Disbandment of Los Prisioneros ===
In February 1989 Claudio Narea discovered love letters from González to his wife. Jorge, also married, admitted adultery, and when Claudio had reconciled with his wife Jorge proposed a threesome. Claudio refused and the day after the refusal Jorge attempted suicide by taking himself 16 valium pills and self-injuring. In 1990 Narea left the band, and Gonzalez and Miguel Tapia continued with new members until 1991.

The same month, Gonzalez finished mixing "Corazones", their fourth and most successful album. He stayed in L.A under Gustavo Santaolalla's guidance. Back in Chile he started rehearsing for a tour with Claudio Narea and Miguel Tapia. One month beforehand Narea quit amid rumours of the love triangle, embarking on a series of interviews with the Prisioneros hating right wing press, blaming his exit from the successful trio on a "sell out" by the band. But he later decided to ghostwrite a "tell all" book with a writer from El Mercurio, the main dictatorship newspaper, an unexpected move coming from a musician until then considered a hero. In a heavily militarized Chile his juicy story got enhanced with Acid House debauchery (Gonzalez claiming to be the first Latin artist to embrace House and Techno) and colourful tales of drugs and madness. The band split and Jorge got signed by EMI UK and embarked on a successful career until he suddenly broke up a multi-million 6-album deal to look for musical freedom, saying goodbye to stardom for almost a decade. He became a cult figure for some and a "troubled" character to the mainstream.

=== Solo career ===
After the continental success and enormous social significance of Los Prisioneros, González's story as a solo singer-songwriter has been anything but predictable. His first attempt at this was made when he first broke up with Los Prisioneros, in 1991, and decided to partner with his longtime manager, Carlos Fonseca, to develop a first album of continental promotion. To do this, he got a record deal with characteristics never before seen in Chile. He signed it at the EMI offices in London, and for it he became a "regional priority artist", with a commitment to release three albums in six years. The production of the famous Gustavo Santaolalla, a luxury studio in Los Angeles, California and a budget of 150 thousand dollars resulted in "Jorge González" (1991), an album with soft melodies and abundant references. personal; partly indebted to the spirit of loving reflection that had guided Corazones (1990), from his former band. For the live performances, González put together a band led by the Frugone brothers, from Vienna and Anachena.

A careful promotional campaign, a glamorous launch at the Sheraton hotel, and full-color posters in the streets of Santiago publicly presented an album that was broadcast with the single "Mi casa en el arbol" (My house in the tree). It was also the beginning of a resounding failure, as neither the public nor the critics seemed to feel comfortable with the album. Topics such as "Esta es para hacerte feliz" (This is to make you happy) and "Fe" (Faith) initially achieved a less than lukewarm public response, compared to expectations and the memory of his glory with Los Prisioneros. "They were throwing me on the wave Chayanne, and that was a mistake," the musician would later admit, when it was too late to save the investment in the album. The following year, González recorded El Futuro Se Fue, being the last album with the EMI label.

In his annoyance over an exaggerated promotion that had only managed to spoil him, González calmly prepared a coup from which the EMI label had a hard time recovering. With a still privileged budget, the musician recorded between Santiago de Chile and Germany the album "El futuro se fue" (1994), in which he experimented with some electronics, and felt it necessary to pay tribute to his newly discovered new idol: Víctor Jara. He produced it in part with Carlos Cabezas, and spent a heavy budget on the mix.

Yet from the perspective of what is to be expected from a pop star, González's second album was one of insolent austerity, and did not have a single bearable single in sight. "The future is gone" sounded like anguish, aridity and painful introspection, with cuts in which the musician seemed at times to tear himself apart, and in others to be just playing. Faced with the impossibility of promoting an album this strange, only one of its tracks, "Mapuche o español" (Mapuche or Spanish) sounded on the radio, although almost as a rarity, the singer-songwriter agreed with EMI the cancellation of your contract.

Around 1995–1997, Jorge moved to New York City. Although he spent much time in studios, as well as having his own home studio, Jorge attended the Institute of Audio Research engineering school in New York City to further his audio engineering knowledge. He also worked with Dandy Jack to produce the duo "Gonzalo Martinez" which was a hit in Europe, the album is a mix of traditional cumbia music all done through electronic programs, synthesizers, and sequencers. Around this time he reunited with Miguel Tapia (former drummer of Los Prisioneros) and formed a group called Los Dioses. Argenis Brito joined in as well, and they formed a trio. The band was a vehicle to promote the "Gonzalo Martinez" album in Latin America. A couple of concerts took place in Chile and Peru and the group proved to be a short stint, nearly lasting a year. Jorge in interviews has gone on to say that the album was ahead of its time for Latin America, while he compares that in Europe the album immediately took off. In 2004 Jorge also sang lead vocals for the electronic minimal dance group Sieg Uber Die Sonne in the album "+1" which was a very well received album in Europe.

In 1999, Jorge signed with Chilean label Alerce. He began work on "Mi Destino: Confesiones de una estrella de rock" after various rehab treatments in Cuba. He completely produced the album himself in his home studio. The album was released in 1999. The album was much better received than "El Futuro Se Fue" and he promoted the album through various television program appearances and performances. However, he never toured with the album even though reviews for the album were positive. The album is considered one of his most consistent albums in his solo career and is currently his last solo album under his own name.

=== Los Prisioneros reunion ===
In 2001, Jorge had a reunion with former Los Prisioneros bandmates Miguel Tapia and Claudio Narea. They agreed to put past differences aside and reunite as a band. Unlike most bands, Los Prisioneros reunited without any sponsorship from any company and promoted their own concert in the Estadio Nacional of Chile scheduled for 30 November 2001. Ticket sales sold out immediately. Due to overwhelming demand, a second night was announced for 1 December 2001. Both concerts sold out within hours of their announcements. Both nights in total brought in approximately 140,000 people in attendance. This historic moment in Chilean music was documented on a two disc DVD containing footage from the concert released in 2002 along with a separate audio only two disc CD set also released in 2002. Throughout 2002 a long tour in Chile was successful and in 2003 they played in various other countries in Latin America, Spain, and the US In early 2003 they began work on a new studio album, which was released by Warner Music Latina in 2003. The album was instantly certified platinum prior to release. Reviews for the album were mixed and after more touring, Claudio Narea announced his departure from the group through their official website. Various media outlets covered the story which caused a stir in the media. Jorge announced the band would continue without Claudio and in 2004 released "Manzana" which was well received when compared to the self-titled album from 2003. A lengthy tour followed throughout 2004–2006 that included Latin America, the U.S. and Canada. Guest musicians featured Gonzalo Yañez on guitars and back up vocals and Sergio "Coty" Badilla on guitars, back up vocals, and synthesizers. Initially the band was going to relocate in Mexico to in a sense "start over" as Jorge put it. Reasons for relocating were simply because of the bad press in Chile who took sides with the former guitarist Claudio Narea. Miguel Tapia and Sergio "Coty" Badilla told Jorge they would not move from Chile. Jorge understood and through their official website announced the dissolution of the band which took place in March 2006.

=== Los Updates ===
In the summer of 2006, after relocating to Mexico, D.F., Jorge along with his wife Loreto Otero formed the duo Los Updates. They began networking through Myspace and built a fan base which consists of various people around the world. Los Updates music is solely composed and produced by Jorge with Loreto providing back up vocals and playing the synthesizer for live concerts. Initially she only sang back up and was in charge of controlling the visuals on stage. The music is self described by them as minimal dance house music. They released an E.P. in Chile in the summer of 2007, and the E.P. was released in Mexico in 2008 with bonus remix tracks. In Chile, both singles from the E.P. were ranked number 1 since their debuts in the Chilean music charts. Jorge was invited to perform in the Cumbre del Rock Chileno (a huge festival featuring over 40 bands) in 2007 by himself in Chile, and negated rumors of a possible Los Prisioneros reunion. He performed a 20-minute set by himself in front of approximately 40,000 people with only a Fender Telecaster strapped on. He later went on to perform on a few dates (again, by himself) of a small festival tour called Garage Music festival which featured a few national Chilean rock bands.

In 2008, Jorge decided to organize a short tour in Chile similar to his appearance in the Cumbre del Rock Chileno which was regarded in the press as one of the highlights of the festival. Around this time he was dubbed by various media outlets as the "Father of Chilean Rock" a title which Jorge has called flattering but at the same time nothing he's taking too seriously. The tour proved to be successful and promised to release a CD and DVD documenting the concerts. He appeared in a few television programs during the tour and claimed to have organized the tour to get out the idea of playing by himself in small venues before he lost the momentum to do so. He announced that with the tour over, he would go to work with Los Updates full-time and on 22 September a full-length studio album was released in Europe and was imported to the U.S. on 30 September.

Los Updates disbanded in 2012.

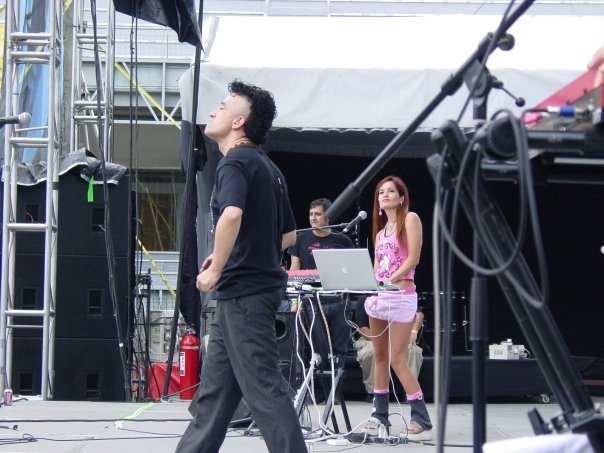
Vive Latino Mexico

== Discography ==
- Jorge González (EMI-Odeon – 1993)
- El Futuro Se Fue (EMI-Odeon – 1994) (The Future is Gone)
- Gonzalo Martínez y Sus Congas Pensantes (RCA/BMG – 1997) (Gonzalo Martinez and His Thinking Congas)
- Mi Destino: Confesiones de una estrella de rock (Alerce – 1999) (My Destiny: Confessions of a Rock Star)
- Los Updates EP (2007) in Chile released under: Feria la Oreja, in the U.S.: Nacional Records, in Argentina: Secsy discos, and in Mexico: Noiselab Records
- First If You Please Part 1 (2008) 12" remix album on Cadenza Records
- First If You Please Part 2 (2008) 12" remix album on Cadenza Records
- First If You Please (2008) (full-length album CD) on Cadenza Records
- Libro (2013, Plaza Independencia Música) (Book) CD/12"
- Naked Tunes (2014)
- Mixed Feelings (2015)
- Trenes (2015, Musica y Entretenimiento S.A./Hueso) (Trains) CD/12"
- Manchitas (2018, Avenida La Novena) CD
