= 1995 Chilean telethon =

Charity event

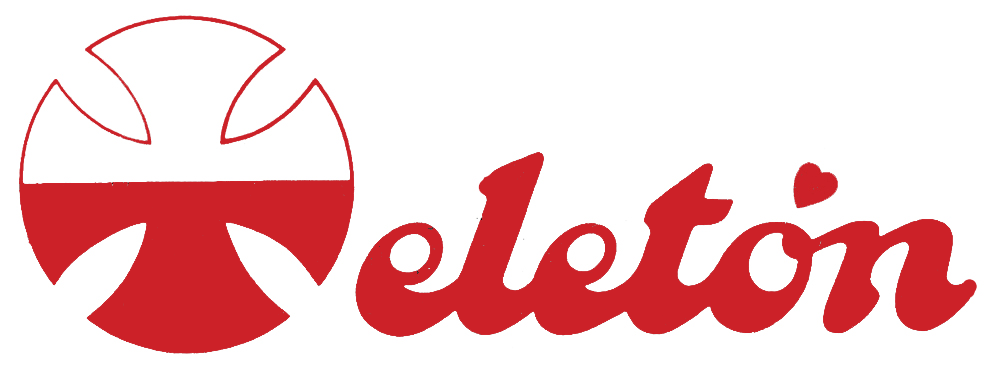
Chilean Telethon's logo

The 1995 Chilean telethon was the 13th version of the solidarity campaign held in Chile since 1978. The theme of this version was "Our great work." The event took place on 1–2 December 1995. The chosen poster boy for the campaign was Marcel Cáceres.

The event, broadcast over 27 consecutive hours, was conducted primarily at the Teatro Teleton and the closing of the programme was broadcast from the National Stadium, the first time that the closing of the program was held there. During the early hours of Sunday, 3 December the final count was given, a total of CL$ 5,005,253,668. Although that figure far exceeded the amount collected from the last telethon (CL$ 3,138,513,916), the goal was to double that amount, so it was the first and, so far, the only telethon that has failed the objective, with the finale just being the song Ode to Joy.

== Development ==
As usual, the Telethon was opened in the presence of various authorities with an emotional keynote address by Don Francisco, where he announced that the goal for this year would be double the amount raised in the previous edition, making the goal CL$ 6,277,027,832. In the first count, held at 23.15, the enthusiasm was high as the figure given by the Bank of Chile reached $ 32,357,523, more than double the proceeds from the 1994 Telethon at the same time. But as the next few hours passed, the donations began to wane, and at 00.17, the second count nearly equalled the figure of last year's event, and by 10am it had not even surpassed 700 million pesos. During that time, a group of government politicians and members of the government opposition did a comic piece called "Policoro."

The figures throughout the day were not encouraging, at 17.42, a new total showed only CL$ 1,879,164,121.

When the final leg of the presentation started at the Teatro Teleton (about 19.00), Don Francisco asked TV channels for a one-hour delay in transmission of their newscasts to urge Chileans to go to the bank. The channels accepted the proposal and, at 22.00, Francisco gave the new total CL$ 3,208,291,257.

The likelihood that the goal would not be reached became more and more apparent, two hours before the end of the event and the total had only just passed the previous events, half of the goal. In an interview on Channel 13 newscast, Teletrece, Don Francisco, before going to the National Stadium, stating that nothing had worked as planned, and asking people to go back to the bank if possible, and that he did not think the goal would be met, although he hoped at least to get close to it.

For the first time the closing event was at the National Stadium, which was filled to capacity. At 23.26, a new total was given, CL$ 3,908,243,017. Don Francisco finally admitted that the goal will not be reached, which was confirmed when at 00.33, the numbers barely exceeded $ 4,200 million.

The transmission extended for an hour and at 2.06 the final count was CL$ 5,005,253,668, nearly 1,200 million pesos less than expected. Prior to closing, Don Francisco thanked all those involved and expressed his respect for those who did not. Days later, the Bank of Chile gave the final count of $ 5,534,774,829, which would become the goal for the next edition.

== Totals ==
Time (UTC−3)	Amound in pesos
22.15 (Dec. 1, 1995)	$ 130,540
23.13	$ 32,357,523
00.17 (Dec.2, 1995)	$ 182,532,939
01.34	$ 288,372,298
04.43	$ 380,352,436
06.59	$ 407,024,989
09.42	$ 539,352,313
10.44	$ 689,900,247
11.43	$ 782,686,275
13.14	$ 918,448,845
15.14	$ 1,324,047,202
17.42	$ 1,879,164,121
19.42	$ 2,128,736,935
20.57	$ 2,880,979,153
22.05	$ 3,208,291,257
23.26	$ 3,908,243,017
00.33 (Dec.3, 1995)	$ 4,204,332,866
00.56	$ 4,663,423,859
02.06	$ 5,005,253,668

== Sponsors ==
Company	Product	Donation (in pesos)
Babysan	Baby Nappies	$37.867.930
Banco de Chile	Banking	$52.940.759
Cachantún	Mineral Water	$34.980.000
Cerveza Cristal	Beer	$55.798.283
Coca-Cola	Soft Drinks	$45.100.000
Colún	Cheeses	$36.430.593
Confort	Toilet Paper	$40.000.000
Copec	Petroleum	$40.000.000
CTC Mundo	Telephone Services	$87.566.406
Dos en Uno (Chubi)	Preserves and Sweets	$32.199.000
Dos en Uno (Selz, Mamba y Holanda)	Biscuits	$41.290.000
Johnson's Clothes	Clothing	$32.110.000
Linic	Shampoo	$36.273.394
Lucchetti	Cakes	$36.720.830
Nova	Sanitary towels	$34.000.000
Odontine	Toothpaste	$33.494.826
Omo Matic	Detergent	$40.230.780
Otto Kraus	Toys	$30.250.000
Panadol	Analgesics	$30.600.000
Pisco Control	Fish Products	$37.280.552
Ripley	Chainstores	$32.157.839
Savory	Icecreams	$34.000.000
Secret	Deodorants	$32.747.729
Soprole	Milk	$44.288.275
Soprole	Yoghurt	$30.794.863
Super Pollo	Chicken Products	$40.502.000
Té Supremo	Tea	$34.674.470
Zuko	Powdered Drinks	$37.175.450

== Artists ==
=== National singers ===
- (Chile) Juan Antonio Labra
- (Chile) Alberto Plaza
- (Chile) Cecilia Echeñique
- (Chile) Irene Llano
- (Chile) Patricia Frias
- (Chile) Lorena
- (Chile) Los Jaivas
- (Chile) Buddy Richard
- (Chile) La Sociedad
- (Chile) La Sonora de Tommy Rey
- (Chile) Los Ramblers
- Los Peores de Chile
- (Chile) Rodolfo Navech
- (Chile) Ginette Acevedo
- (Chile) Cristobal
- (Chile) Nelly Sanders
- (Chile) Keko Yungue
- (Chile) René Inostroza
- (Chile) (Italy) Paolo Salvatore
- (Chile) Rumba 8
- (Chile) Aleste
- (Chile) Álvaro Scaramelli
- (Chile) Beatlemania
- (Chile) Germán Casas
- (Chile) Sonora Palacios
- (Chile) Banda San Andrés
- (Chile) El Monteaguilino
- (Chile) La nueva ola
- (Chile) Javiera Parra
- (Chile) (Italy) Andrea Tessa
- (Chile) Illapu
- (Chile) Myriam Hernández
- (Chile) Jano Soto

=== International singers ===
- (Mexico) Garibaldi
- (Spain) Luz Casal
- (Brazil) Daniela Mercury
- (Colombia) Aterciopelados
- Barrio Boyzz
- Banana 5
- (Argentina) Facundo Monti
- (Mexico) Azul Violeta
- (Argentina) Los Calzones Rotos
- (Puerto Rico) Proyecto Uno
- (Panama) El General

=== Comedians ===
- Coco Legrand
- Jorge "Chino" Navarrete
- Oscar Gangas
- Paulo Iglesias
- Ricardo Meruane
- Thompson - Bruce
- Los Indolatinos
- Lalo Vilches
- Álvaro Salas

=== Magazine ===
- Johnny Weich, ventriloquist
- Ballet Mosseiev
- Generación 95
- Raul Di Blasio

=== Children's Section ===
- Disney Club
- Pipiripao
- Cachureos
- Los Tachuelas
- La Chilindrina

== Transmission ==
- Telenorte
- Canal 2 Rock & Pop
- La Red
- UCV Televisión
- Televisión Nacional de Chile
- Megavisión
- Chilevisión Red de Televisión Universidad de Chile
- Universidad Católica de Chile Televisión
- Red Metrópolis-TV Cable Intercom
- Red VTR TV Cable-Cablexpress
