= 1988 Chilean telethon =

Charity event

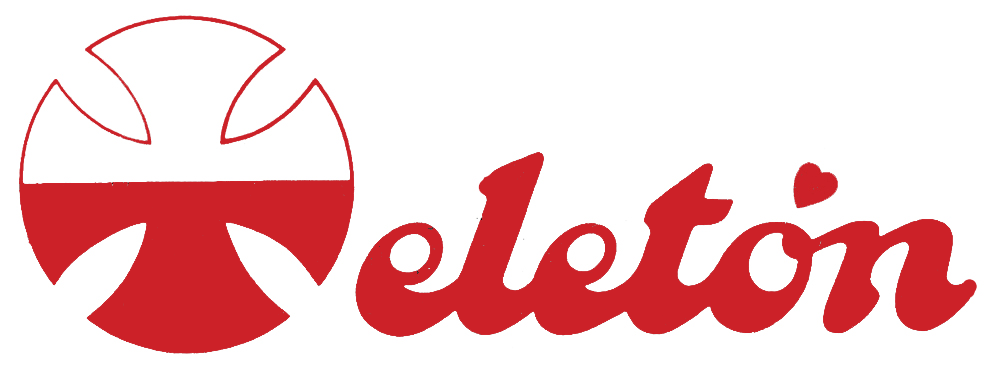
Chilean Telethon's logo

The 1988 Chilean telethon was the eighth version of the solidarity campaign conducted in Chile, which took place on 2 and 3 December 1988. The theme of this version was "It's Everybody's Task," and the official theme song Soy tu amigo (I'm your friend), was sung by Miguel Zabaleta and Cecilia Echenique. The poster boy was Rodrigo Caceres, who is remembered for having memorized all the companies sponsoring the event.

The morning newscast was in charge of Radio Cooperativa, they therefore resorted to the announcer Sergio Campos, for the first time, on television. He read the news as if he was in a radio studio. One of the stories of this edition was that the children's section of the programme was issued fully recorded, unlike previous years.

This campaign initially seemed likely to fail, the slowness of the Chileans to donate made the program directors lengthen the schedule by about 1 hour, thus giving time to reach the goal at 0030 on Sunday, 4 December. The amount collected was: CL$525,801,100 later after the telethon ended the figure of CL$ 711,712,019 was reached

The telethon was held two months after the well-remembered and historic plebiscite of 5 October that year and was the last telethon which took place under the military government of Augusto Pinochet. And of course, it marked Teleton's 10th year.

== Sponsors ==
Aceite Cristal; Agua Mineral Cachantún; Banco de Chile; Bigtime de Dos en Uno; Cecinas La Preferida; Coca-Cola; Cola Cao; Combustibles Copec; Detergente Ace	Galletas Costa; Helados Savory; Jabón Camay; Johnson's Clothes; Leche Soprole; Nescafé; Odontine; Pastas Lucchetti; Pilsener Dorada	Pisco Control; Productos Kodak; Quesos Colún; Refrescos Yupi; Soft; Té Supremo; Vinos Santa Carolina; Yoghurt Soprole

== Artists ==
=== Nationals ===
- (Chile) Juan Antonio Labra
- (Chile) Los Huasos Quincheros
- (Chile) Gloria Simonetti
- (Chile) Luis Jara
- (Chile) (Italy) Andrea Tessa
- (Chile) Alberto Plaza
- (Chile) Peter Rock
- (Chile) Patricia Frías
- (Chile) Miguel Piñera
- (Chile) Patricio Renán
- (Chile) Eduardo Fuentes
- (Chile) (Mexico) (Netherlands) Roberto Vander
- (Chile) Sergio Lillo
- (Chile) Roberto Viking Valdés
- (Chile) Jorge Eduardo
- (Chile) Wildo
- (Chile) Irene Llanos
- (Chile) Lorena
- (Chile) Pachuco
- (Chile) Alejandro De Rosas
- (Chile) María Inés Naveillán
- (Chile) Claudia Muñoz
- (Chile) Cristóbal
- (Chile) Eduardo Gatti
- (Chile) Keko Yungue
- (Chile) José Luis Arce
- (Chile) Ginette Acevedo
- (Chile) Mónica De Calixto
- (Chile) Lucho Muñoz
- (Chile) Álvaro Scaramelli

== International ==
- (Puerto Rico) Chayanne
- (Argentina) Sandro
- (Argentina) Fito Páez
- (United States) Al Di Meola
- (Spain) Víctor Manuel
- (Dominican Republic) Ángela Carrasco
- (Spain) Amaya Uranga
- (Argentina) Las Primas
- (Cuba) Franco
- (Argentina) Nito Mestre
- (Spain) (Italy) (Panama) Miguel Bosé
- (Mexico) Viento y Marea
- (Argentina) Sandra Mihanovich
- (Argentina) Celeste Carvallo
- (Argentina) Orlando Netti
- (Spain) Braulio

== Comedians ==
- José Luis Giogia
- Coco Legrand
- Ricardo Meruane
- Jorge Navarrete
- Pepe Tapia
- Checho Hirane
- Álvaro Salas
- Jorge Cruz
- Carlos Helo
- Sergio Feito
- Lucho Arenas
- Clavel
- Gigi Martin

== Magazine ==
- BAFOCHI
- Hugo Urrutia
- Gloria Benavides
- Tamare Tahiti
- Mario Buqueño
- Gerardo Parra
- Ramón Núñez

== In Children's Section ==
The entire segment was pre-recorded and taped specially for this event.

- El Profesor Rossa
- Patio Plum
- Cachureos
- Pipiripao
- Alejandro Rojas

== In Adult's Section ==
- Bambi
- Cristina Tocco
- Maripepa Nieto

== Transmission ==
- UCV Televisión
- Televisión Nacional de Chile
- Canal 9 Señal 2 de Televisión Nacional de Chile
- Universidad de Chile Televisión
- Universidad Católica de Chile Televisión
- Telenorte
- Red TV Cable
