= 2002 Chilean telethon =

Charity event

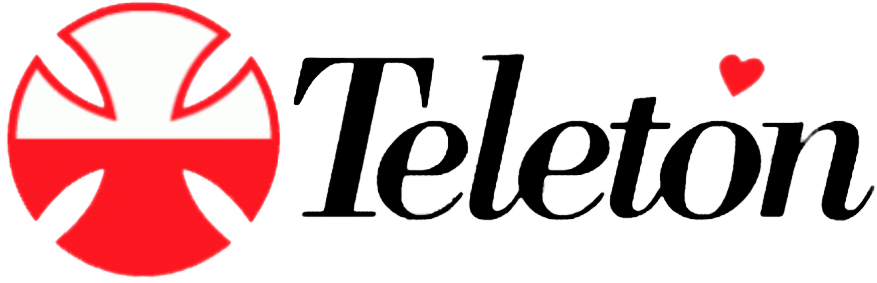
Chilean Telethon's logo

The 2002 Chilean telethon (Spanish: Teletón 2002) was the 17th Telethon charity campaign held in Chile, which took place 29–30 November 2002. The theme was "The Telethon is Yours", (La Teletón es tuya).

The goal was to raise CL$10 billion. In 2001, the Telethon Foundation gave a press conference warning that they had to borrow one billion pesos to cover expenses for the subsequent months. Because of this, part of the official advertising featured the message "The Telethon is at zero pesos, help more than ever". The message also appeared on the official poster of the event featuring Don Francisco with a sad face showing the empty pockets of his trousers.

A final collection of CL$10,532,480,521 was reached, greatly exceeding the goal. The total was publicly given in the Chile's National Stadium on 1 December. The poster girl for the event was Kimberly Cruz.

== Donation totals ==
Time (UTC−3)	Amount in pesos
22.53 (29 Nov.)	$18,921
23.41	$267,669,364
00.40 (30 Nov.)	$580,125,779
02.19	$712,692,221
03.37	$1,010,347,500
04.31	$1,134,475,835
07.57	$1,279,714,652
10.24	$1,587,219,238
12.39	$1,961,092,961
14.06	$2,495,081,318
14.52	$3,077,537,538
16.16	$3,535,977,371
16.54	$4,012,301,701
18.19	$4,464,830,168
18.55	$4,950,351,861
19.35	$5,108,339,626
20.02	$5,468,310,558
20.37	$6,108,670,146
20.56	$6,598,843,607
22.22	$6,843,523,018
23.13	$7,523,440,396
23.35	$8,400,527,116
00.05 (1 Dec.)	$9,037,673,408
00.33	$9,521,707,600
01.14	$10,532,480,521

== First goal ==
Don Francisco predicted that donations were going to exceed Telethon 2000 which collected $6,450,614,205. The last total announced in the theatre was $6,598,843,607, 148 million more than the previous season's goal.

== Controversy ==
=== Threat of boycott ===
One of the controversies was a threat of boycott by supporters of the Communist Party of Chile for alleged misuse of money donated. The party claimed that 25% of the collection was for entertainers and artists, and even said Don Francisco took 5% of donations. The charges were eventually dismissed. For her part, the party leader, Gladys Marin, told the press that the event should not be for entertainment but a task of state, also criticizing the donation of $40,000,000 that was to be given to the then Mayor of Santiago, Joaquin Lavín Infante.

=== Reviews of Los Prisioneros ===
At the close of the Telethon at the National Stadium, the group Los Prisioneros was introduced, who changed the lyrics of the song "Quieren Dinero" (They want money). In the new words, Jorge González Rios criticized both economic groups and various right-wing politicians in the chorus: "Quiero más Luksic, quiero más Angelini; quiero más UDI, quiero más Pinocheques; quiero más Büchi, quiero más Lavín; quiero más libras, quiero más dólares" (I want more Luksic, I want more Angelini, I want more UDI, I want more Pinocheques, I want more Büchi, I want more Lavín, I want more pounds, I want more dollars). The action was criticized by the organizers, decrying the use of the campaign for proselytizing, but it had the support of a significant number of Chileans who understood that the words of Gonzalez Ríos reflected the reality of the campaign:

"How nice! isn't it? How nice that you can transform one thing into another, that of all the giant ego, of all the desire to appear that the artists have, no? it can be transformed into help for children. That all the greed and sense of good business that companies have, that they can raise prices, pay less taxes, advertise themselves, and that what people eat, in quotes, to help, really you can help children. But it is the (?)rooster who puts his hand in his pocket at the end, and the goal is met."

— Jorge González Rios, November 30, 2002

On closing the event, the entertainer Kike Morande found the sayings of the group's vocalist a "very bad thing". Days later, at a conference, Gonzalez reaffirmed the statements he made in the last hours of the event. The executive director of the Telethon, Ximena Casarejos called the words of Gonzalez "like an attack", in an interview given to the Chilean newscast, 24 Horas. Another version circulating about the reason for this criticism was a suspected "personal vengeance" by Jorge Gonzalez against the organizers of the Telethon, for the alleged censorship by TVN during the performance of its group in the 1985's Telethon, since Los Prisioneros was openly opposed to the then military regime of Augusto Pinochet.

== Sponsors ==
188 Telefónica Mundo; Banco de Chile; Cachantún; Cerveza Cristal; Clos de Pirque; Farmacias Salcobrand; Helados Savory; Johnson's Clothes; Juguetes Hasbro; Lan Chile	Leche Soprole; Lucchetti; McDonald's; Nenegloss; Omo; Pampers; Papel higiénico Confort; Pepsodent; Pepsi; Pisco Capel	Quesos Colún; Ripley; Super Pollo; Tapsín; Telefónica Móvil; Té Supremo; Terra; Yoghurt Soprole; Zapatillas Golf; Zuko

== Artists ==
=== National singers ===
- (Chile) (Brazil) Joe Vasconcellos
- (Chile) Myriam Hernández
- (Chile) Mala Junta
- (Chile) Andrés De León
- (Chile) Douglas
- (Chile) Alberto Plaza
- (Chile) (Brazil) Café con Leche
- (Chile) Luis Jara
- (Chile) Ciao
- (Chile) DJ Méndez
- (Chile) Los Jaivas
- (Chile) Los Prisioneros
- (Chile) Yerko Triviño
- (Chile) La Ley
- (Chile) Supernova
- (Chile) Buddy Richard

=== International singers ===
- (Mexico) Emmanuel
- (Mexico) Pedro Fernández
- (Brazil) Axé Bahía
- (Spain) Víctor Manuel
- (Mexico) Yuri
- (Brazil) Porto Seguro
- (Brazil) Carambaxé
- (Puerto Rico) Luis Fonsi
- (Italy) (Switzerland) Paolo Meneguzzi
- (Mexico) Patricia Manterola

=== Comedians ===
- Sandy
- Daniel Vilches
- Bombo Fica
- Coco Legrand
- Álvaro Salas
- Dino Gordillo

=== Magazine ===
- The Politicians danced axé
- Team Mekano
- Bafochi

=== Children's section ===
- Cachureos
- Los Tachuelas
- Zoolo TV

=== Adult's section ===
- Graciela Alfano

== Transmission ==
- Red Televisión
- UCV Televisión
- Televisión Nacional de Chile
- Mega
- Chilevisión
- Canal 13
