= 1990 Chilean telethon =

Charity event

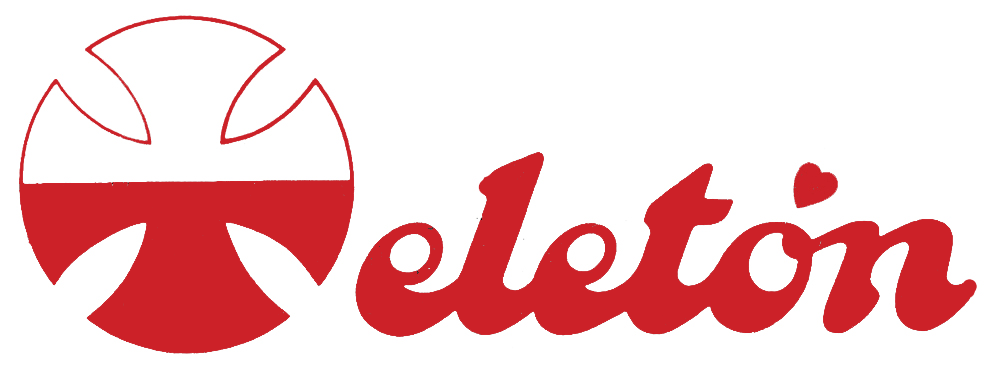
Chilean Telethon's logo

The 1990 Chilean telethon was the ninth version of the solidarity campaign conducted in Chile, which took place on 7 and 8 December 1990. The theme of this version was "No-one Left Out."

The poster girl was Daniela Muñoz. The telethon was held after 24 months as in 1989 the event was suspended by presidential and parliamentary elections.

This was the first telethon to be held in Chile after the return to democracy and under the leadership of President Patricio Aylwin.

The final figure came to CL$1,153,291,010.

== Sponsors ==
Aceite Chef; Agua Mineral Cachantún; Banco de Chile; Cecinas Winter; Chocolates Dos en Uno; Cola Cao; Combustibles Copec; Detergente Ace; Fanta	Galletas Soda Costa; Helados Savory; Jabón Moncler; Johnson's Clothes; Leche Soprole; Nescafé; Odontine; Panadol; Pastas Lucchetti	Pilsener Dorada; Pisco Control; Productos Kodak; Quesos Colún; Refrescos Yupi; Shampoo Dimensión; Té Supremo; Yoghurt Soprole

== Artists ==
=== Nationals ===
- (Chile) Fernando Ubiergo
- (Chile) Illapu
- (Chile) Los Huasos Quincheros
- (Chile) Rumba 8
- (Chile) José Luis Arce
- (Chile) Cecilia Echeñique
- (Chile) Juan Antonio Labra
- (Chile) Alberto Plaza
- (Chile) Giolito y Su Combo
- (Chile) Eduardo Valenzuela
- (Chile) Álvaro Scaramelli
- (Chile) Miguelo
- (Chile) Los Huasos de Algarrobal
- (Chile) Luis Mariano
- (Chile) Los Clásicos
- (Chile) Buddy Richard
- (Chile) Beatlemanía
- (Chile) Carlos Vásquez
- (Chile) Roberto Viking Valdés
- (Chile) Antumapu
- (Chile) Juan Carlos Duque
- (Chile) Síndrome
- (Chile) Inti-Illimani
- (Chile) Gloria Simonetti
- (Chile) Los Prisioneros
- (Chile) *Luis Jara
- (Chile) (Italy) *Andrea Tessa
- (Chile) (Italy) Paolo Salvatore
- (Chile) Myriam Hernández
- * Singers of the official song "No-one Left Out".

=== International Artists ===
- (Spain) Amaya Uranga
- Susy González
- (Cuba) Celia Cruz
- (Spain) Ana Torroja
- María Ovando
- Manny Menito
- (Venezuela) Rudy La Scala
- (Puerto Rico) Yolandita Monge
- (Venezuela) Qué Pasa
- (Brazil) Xuxa
- (Argentina) Juan Ramón
- (Spain) Mocedades
- (Spain) Luz Casal

=== Comedians ===
- Checho Hirane
- El Tufo
- Lucho Arenas Jr.
- Álvaro Salas
- Guiliermo Bruce
- Eduardo Thompson
- Jorge Cruz
- Gilberto Guzmán
- Ricardo Meruane

=== Magazine ===
- Hugo Urrutia's Ballet
- Chamber of Deputies (song)
- BAFOCHI
- Daniel Lencina
- Mago Oli
- Julio Jung (reciter)
- Ballet Ciclodanza
- Trio Allegro

=== In Children's Section ===
- Pipiripao
- Snow White
- Pinocho
- Peter Pan
- La Pintita
- Show de Enza
- Mini Pop
- El Profesor Rossa
- Cachureos

=== In Adult's Section ===
- Tatiana Merino
- Las Corselas
- Rita Riveira
- Bambina
- Bim-Bam-Bum
- Maripepa Nieto

== Transmission ==
- Telenorte
- UCV Televisión
- Televisión Nacional de Chile
- Megavisión (first year under present name, third overall)
- Universidad de Chile Televisión
- Universidad Católica de Chile Televisión
- Univisión
- Canal 8 UCV Televisión
- Canal 10 Universidad Austral de Chile
- Red TV Cable

== Curiosities ==
At 7:45 on Saturday, December 8, 1990, coinciding with the Feast of the Immaculate Conception, Channel 13 and TVN left the live transmission to deliver the mass. For this reason, the News Section was broadcast only by UCV TV, Channel 8 (La Serena), Channel 10 (Valdivia), Telenorte, Megavisión, Channel 11 and Red TV Cable.

On the final block of the event, Univision broadcast the transmission from the theater to the affiliated channels (except for Televisa's channel s), which helped in putting thoughts for a Teletón to be held in the US and Mexico.

The supposed goal was 711,712,019 pesos, but the organization wanted to reach a milestone goal of 1,000,000,000 pesos, which was met at the final tote of 1,106,098,601 pesos causing the tally board to put 1 in the Cash ($) sign as it was only capable of 9 numbers instead of 10.
