= 1998 Chilean telethon =

Charity event

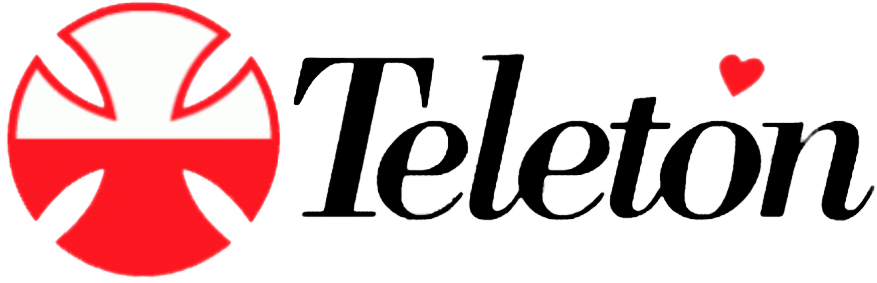
Chilean Telethon's logo

The 1998 Chilean telethon (December 4–5, 1998) was the 15th version of the solidarity campaign conducted in Chile. The theme of this version was "We All Matter." Happily surpassing the target, raising CL$6,029,912,577 (Total at 00:57 on December 6, delivered at the National Stadium of Chile). the poster girl was Scarlett Barrientos. This edition was performed after 24 months without Telethon, because in December 1997 Chilean parliamentary elections were held.

As a curiosity, TVN had a strike during the buildup to the show. It was due to proposed salary reductions affecting all employees of the state channel. The strike caused Channel 13 to send their camera operators to cover the transmission with TVN cameras, otherwise it would have had to suspend nearly half of the show. Mario Kreutzberger, in an interview on Teletrece, thanked Channel 13 for carrying out this action. However, state television reached an agreement at 0:00 on December 6, 1998, almost when the Telethon was finished.

"Let me take this moment to give special thanks to Channel 13, not because I belong to Channel 13, but because Channel 13 at the last minute covered much of the transmission with equipment that if we had not had, we would have had to suspend nearly half the show for reasons everybody knows."

— Don Francisco

It was also the teleton's 20th anniversary year.

For some of the parts during the event, were broadcast from the Hyatt Hotel auditorium in Santiago

== Two countries with the same dream ==
It was a coincidence that year that just as Chile was making the 15th Telethon, in Mexico on the same day the 2nd edition of the Mexican Telethon was being made, with the famous artist and singer Lucero as leading entertainer. This permitted three contacts to be made between the two programs via satellite, these link-ups were made at 03:00, 11:30, and 18:30, Chile Summer Time (GMT-3), on December 5. During these links, both countries mutually dedicated songs of encouragement and sang each other's account numbers of donations to motivate both the Chilean and the Mexican public, in addition, the entertainers exchanged information about the progress of their collections. This would be the first and only time they would communicate together as they have done their Telethons on different dates.

== Computing ==
Time	Total en pesos
22.16 (Dec. 4)	$10,479
23.40	$171,826,314
05.03 (Dec. 5)	$341,940,275
11.00	$600,103,059
13.30	$849,368,110
16.18	$1,299,193,432
19.01	$1,950,774,305
19.37	$2,301,420,662
20.25	$2,743,622,981
21.09	$3,289,421,688
22.29	$3,609,336,438
23.04	$4,045,075,519
23.31	$4,480,670,315
00.08 (Dec. 6)	$4,947,131,908
00.34	$5,420,783,116
00.57	$6,029,912,577

== Sponsors ==
Company	Product	Donation (in pesos)
188 CTC Mundo	Telephone Services	$103,100,188
Arroz Tucapel	Rice	$44,295,920
Babysan de Pampers	Baby's Nappies	$46,195,905
Banco de Chile	Banking	$110,000,000
Bilz y Pap	Beer	$60,225,255
Bon o Bon de Arcor	Cakes	$41,585,400
Cachantun	Mineral Water	$45,336,855
Cerveza Cristal	Beer	$62,416,787
Cocinero Trisol	Cooking Oil	$44,051,579
Colún	Cheese	$43,371,136
Dos en Uno	Biscuits	$57,920,394
Elite	Toilet Paper	$50,470,800
Hasbro	Toys	$37,401,309
Imán de Lotería	Betting	$78,635,926
Johnson's Clothes	Clothing	$40,140,000
Laboratorio Chile	Pharmaceuticals	$73,267,500
Lan Chile	Airline	$107,000,000
Líder (Tarea)	Supermarket	$201,724,403
Lomitón	Fast Food	$142,500,000
Lucchetti	Cakes	$44,000,000
Omo	Detergent	$62,548,650
Pepsodent	Toothpaste	$60,361,791
Ripley	Chainstore	$40,190,825
Savory	Icecreams	$42,300,000
Shampoo Linic	Shampoo	$52,325,470
Soprole	Milk and Yoghurt	$85,149,937
Super Pollo	Chicken Products	$48,504,642
Té Supremo	Tea	$41,931,470
Zuko	Powdered Drinks	$40,570,000
Donación total	-	$1,907,522,742

== Artists ==
=== National singers ===
- (Chile) Illapu
- (Chile) Myriam Hernández
- (Chile) (Argentina) Adrián y los Dados Negros
- (Chile) Mala Junta
- (Chile) Alberto Plaza
- (Chile) Luis Jara
- (Chile) Sexual Democracia
- (Chile) Chancho en Piedra
- (Chile) Nicole
- (Chile) Javiera Parra
- (Chile) Canal Magdalena
- (Chile) La Sociedad
- (Chile) Lucho Gatica
- (Chile) Lorena
- (Chile) Rachel
- (Chile) Douglas
- (Chile) Sonora Palacios
- (Chile) Los Bandoleros de Teno

=== International singers ===
- (Cuba) (United States) Gloria Estefan
- (Italy) (Switzerland) Paolo Meneguzzi
- (Mexico) Vikki Carr
- (Argentina) Pimpinela
- (Colombia) Charlie Zaa
- (Argentina) Antonio Ríos
- (Argentina) El Símbolo
- (Puerto Rico) Carlos Ponce
- (Dominican Republic) Sandy y Papo
- (France) Chris Durán
- (Dominican Republic) Ilegales
- (Argentina) Raul Di Blasio
- (Dominican Republic) Chichí Peralta
- (Argentina) Ataque 77
- (Cuba) Celia Cruz
- (Argentina) (Venezuela) Ricardo Montaner
- (Mexico) Ana Bárbara
- (Mexico) Marco Antonio Solís

=== Comedians ===
- Coco Legrand
- Álvaro Salas
- CNN Carlos Nuñez
- Luciano Bello
- La Vicky y la Gaby
- Jorge "Chino" Navarrete
- Bombo Fica
- Hermogenes Conache
- Checho Hirane
- Ricardo Meruane
- Che Copete

=== Children's section ===
- Cachureos
- Profesor Rossa
- Los Tachuelas
- Mundo Mágico

=== Adult's section ===
- Miss Telethon was held on 98, the candidates were:
  - Andrea Ramírez
  - Gloria Aros
  - Jessica Abudinen
  - Pachi
  - Rocío Ravest
  - Carla Ochoa
  - Ingrid Cruz
  - Helvecia Viera as Rica Evangelista

== Transmission ==
- Telenorte
- Canal 2
- La Red
- UCV Televisión
- Televisión Nacional de Chile
- Megavisión
- Chilevisión
- Universidad Católica de Chile Televisión
