= 1994 Chilean telethon =

Charity event

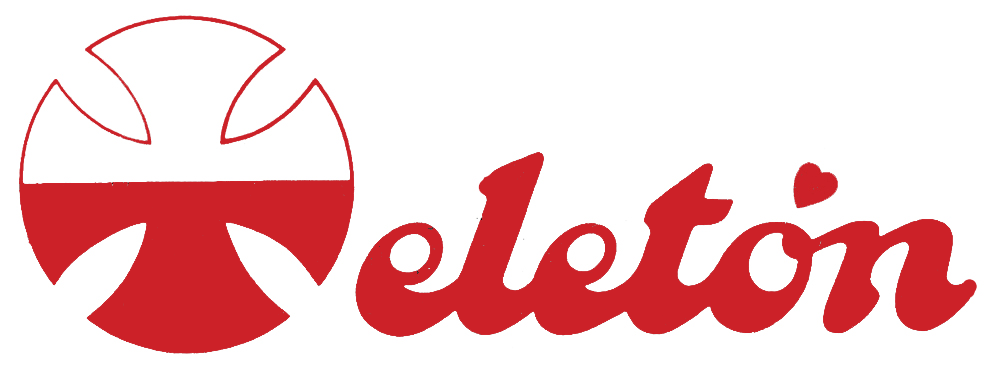
Chilean Telethon's logo

The 1994 Chilean telethon was 12th version of the solidarity campaign conducted in Chile, which took place on the 2nd. and 3 December 1994. The theme of this edition was "Chile's Commitment." The poster boy was Loreto Manzanero. This version was performed 2 years after the previous because in December 1993 parliamentary and presidential elections took place. This was the first telethon to be held during the government of Eduardo Frei Ruiz-Tagle.

The official collection for this campaign was CL$3,640,268,169.

After the final total and a brief interview by Don Francisco of Jane Hermocillas and Valeria Arias, the first two poster girls, to finish the program, artists sang some of the official songs from previous telethons, finishing with all the public entertainers, poster boys and girls, children, and audience singing the "Ode to Joy", marking the first ever telethon for the New Era.

== Totals ==
Time (UTC−3)	Amount in pesos
22.13 (2 Dec. 1994)	$3,500
00.42 (3 Dec. 1994)	$108,243,501
03.01	$191,741,377
06.00	$223,908,655
09.25	$278,534,600
12.10	$430,729,114
12.50	$559,593,379
13.54	$660,848,055
15.24	$803,020,634
16.41	$964,239,633
17.55	$1,304,829,653
19.06	$1,768,369,020
20.12	$1,986,421,501
21.55	$2,112,526,708
23.38	$2,276,592,569
00.27 (4 Dec. 1994)	$2,533,860,427
01.25	$2,952,461,927
02.14	$3,138,513,916
03.01	$3,640,268,169

== Sponsors ==
Company	Product	Donated (in pesos)
Babysan	Baby Nappies	$35.654.000
Banco de Chile	Banking	$48.763.212
Cachantun	Mineral Water	$37.997.180
Cerveza Cristal	Beer	$38.455.658
Coca-Cola	Soft Drinks	$40.000.000
Colún	Cheese	$34.073.989
Confort	Toilet Paper	$40.000.000
Copec	Petroleum	$37.000.000
CTC Mundo	Telephone Services	$80.656.554
Dos en Uno (Privilegio)	Chocolates	$35.000.000
Johnson's Clothes	Clothing	$30.160.000
Lucchetti	Cakes	$34.273.888
Nova	Sanitary Towelss	$33.200.000
Odontine	Toothpaste	$31.112.404
Otto Kraus	Children's Games	$27.867.969
Panadol	Analgesics	$30.500.000
Pisco Control	Fish Products	$34.000.000
Ripley	Chainstore	$30.469.849
Savory	Icecream	$30.652.418
Secret	Deodorants	$29.000.000
Sedal	Shampoo	$31.358.000
Soda Costa	Biscuits	$34.084.698
Soprole	Milk	$40.398.805
Soprole	Yoghurt	$29.205.069
Super Pollo	Chicken Products	$37.396.215
Té Supremo	Tea	$32.030.721
Winter	Meat Products	$34.156.840
Zuko	Powdered Drinks	$34.000.000

== Artists ==
=== National singers ===
- (Chile) Illapu
- (Chile) Keko Yungue
- (Chile) Sexual Democracia
- (Chile) Parkinson
- (Chile) Patricio Renán
- (Chile) Danny Chilean
- (Chile) Susy Becky
- (Chile) Los Tigres
- (Chile) Beatlemanía
- (Chile) Cecilia
- (Chile) Maritza
- (Chile) Carlos González
- (Chile) (Italy) Paolo Salvatore
- (Chile) Los Hermanos Bustos
- (Chile) Eliseo Guevara
- (Chile) Pachuco y la Cubanacán
- (Chile) El Huaso Clavel
- (Chile) Los Chacareros de Paine
- (Chile) El Monteaguilino
- (Chile) Cecilia Echeñique
- (Chile) Sonora Palacios
- (Chile) Andrea Labarca
- (Chile) Fernando Casas
- (Chile) René Inostroza
- (Chile) Zalo Reyes
- (Chile) Álvaro Scaramelli
- (Chile) Los Huasos Quincheros
- (Chile) La Sociedad
- (Chile) Fernando Ubiergo
- (Chile) Alberto Plaza
- (Chile) (Mexico) (Netherlands) Roberto Vander
- (Chile) Sergio Lillo
- (Chile) José Alfredo Fuentes
- (Chile) Wildo
- (Chile) Gloria Benavides
- (Chile) Congreso
- (Chile) Luis Jara

=== International singers ===
- (Spain) Christina y Los Subterráneos
- (Mexico) Los Temerarios
- (Argentina) Los Calzones Rotos
- (Belgium) Technotronic
- (Venezuela) Majo & Co.
- (Italy) Laura Pausini
- (Mexico) Aleks Syntek y la Gente Normal
- (Dominican Republic) Wilfrido Vargas
- Los Kofre
- (Spain) Azúcar Moreno
- (Puerto Rico) Proyecto Uno
- Carolina con K
- (Venezuela) (Argentina) Ricardo Montaner

=== Comedians ===
- José Luis Giogia
- Dino Gordillo
- Daniel Vilches
- Eduardo Thompson
- Guillermo Bruce
- Pepe Tapia
- Bombo Fica
- La Cuatro Dientes
- Pinto, Paredes y Angulo
- Los Indolatinos
- Palta Melendez
- Álvaro Salas

=== Magazine ===
- Bafochi
- Bafona
- Alexandra and her Ballet
- Albert Lucas, juggler
- Martin Lunas
- El Mago Robot
- Raul Di Blasio

=== Children's section ===
- Cachureos
- Pipiripao
- Disney Club

=== Adult's section ===
- Tatiana Merino
- Sandra Callejón
- Paola Volpe

== Transmission ==
- Telenorte
- La Red
- UCV Televisión
- Televisión Nacional de Chile
- Megavisión
- Chilevisión Red de Televisión Universidad de Chile
- Universidad Católica de Chile Televisión
- Red Metrópolis Televisión por Cable
- Red TV Cable Intercom
- Red VTR TV Cable-Cablexpress
