= 1987 Chilean telethon =

Charity event

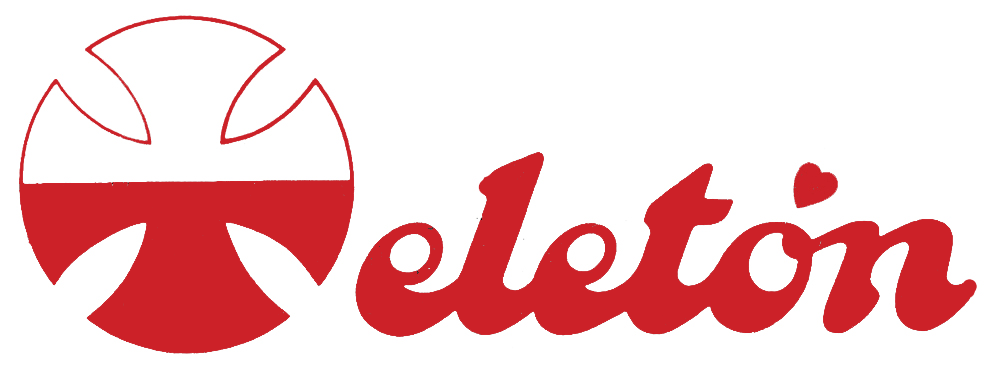
Chilean Telethon's logo

The 1987 Chilean telethon was the seventh version of the solidarity campaign conducted in Chile, which took place on 4 and 5 December 1987. The theme of this version was "To Believe in Life." The poster boy was Victor Torres.

This Telethon came out after a year's absence. The 1986 edition was suspended due to various reasons.

That year also saw disasters: floods and storms in central Chile, as well as attacks and protests, but again that did not stop the exceeding of the target in 1985: $502,293,311.

== Justifications for the suspension of the 1986 edition ==
- First, 1986 saw changes to the Teletón's administration. These included the creation of a new organizing firm, the Fundación Teletón, and the reconstruction and enlargement that took place in the Teatro Casino, which was renamed to Teatro Teletón and given to the foundation.
- The second reason is due to time constraints related to Don Francisco, host of the Chilean Teletón. This was because its main show, Sábado Gigante (which had already 24 years in Canal 13), would be exported to Spanish International Network (later Univision) in the United States, and since 2 editions had to be produced in one week (1 for each network), less time was left for Don Francisco's other projects, the Teletón included.
- The third and final reason is due to the events in that year, which included the disasters mentioned above, and the hosting of the 1986 South American Games.

== Sponsors ==
Aceite Cristal; Agua Mineral Cachantún; Banco de Chile; Cecinas La Preferida; Coca-Cola; Cola Cao; Combustibles Copec; Chocolates Dos en Uno; Detergentes Lever	Galletas Costa; Helados Savory; Jabón Camay; Johnson's Clothes; Leche Soprole; Nescafé; Odontine; Pastas Lucchetti; Pilsener Dorada	Pisco Control; Pre Unic; Productos Kodak; Quesos Colún; Soft; Té Supremo; Vinos Santa Carolina; Yoghurt Soprole

== Artists ==
=== Nationals ===
- (Chile) Los Huasos Quincheros
- (Chile) Irene Llano
- (Chile) Miguel Piñera
- (Chile) Pancho Puelma
- (Chile) Zalo Reyes
- (Chile) Miguelo
- (Chile) Cristóbal
- (Chile) Luis Dimas
- (Chile) Myriam Hernández
- (Chile) Luis Jara
- (Chile) Patricia Maldonado
- (Chile) Eduardo Gatti
- (Chile) Jorge Eduardo
- (Chile) Luz Eliana
- (Chile) Patricio Renán
- (Chile) Santiago Cuatro
- (Chile) Patricia Frías
- (Chile) José Luis Arce
- (Chile) Ginette Acevedo
- (Chile) Roberto Viking Valdés
- (Chile) Sergio Lillo
- (Chile) Maria Inés Naveillán
- (Chile) Soledad Guerrero
- (Chile) Analyo
- (Chile) Mónica De Calixto
- (Chile) Sonora de Tommy Rey
- (Chile) Peter Rock
- (Chile) Gloria Simonetti
- (Chile) Wildo
- (Chile) Las Cuatro Brujas
- (Chile) Alberto Plaza (singer of the 1987 theme Believing in Life (Hands Together)) (Note: Two MTVs of the song were produced, one with Plaza and the nation's leading newsreaders, and another all-star version from the Teleton Theater with Plaza and various artists.)
- (Chile) (Italy) Andrea Tessa
- (Chile) José Alfredo Fuentes
- (Chile) Juan Carlos Duque

=== International Artists ===
- (Argentina) Sandra Mihanovich
- (Spain) Olé Olé
- (Argentina) Celeste Carvallo
- (Argentina) Jairo
- (Argentina) Silvana Di Lorenzo
- (Argentina) Alejandro Lerner
- (Argentina) Alfredo De Angelis
- (Argentina) Rubén Juárez
- (Argentina) Pablito Ruiz
- Oscar De Fontana
- (Argentina) Fito Páez
- (Argentina) Juka Shepp
- (Portugal) Manuela Bravo
- (Spain) Braulio
- Claudio
- (Nicaragua) Hernaldo Zúñiga
- (Venezuela) José Luis Rodríguez "El Puma"
- Pedro Prado
- Mónica Posse

=== Comedians ===
- Coco Legrand
- Jorge "Chino" Navarrete
- Canelo Huanca
- Checho Hirane
- Gigi Martin
- Luis Arenas
- Ernesto Ruiz
- Jappening Con Ja

=== In the Children's Section ===
- The 1987 edition saw a recording of children's TV programmes then airing that year aired.

== Transmission ==
As with previous years, the Teletón was broadcast through all of the TV networks existing back then in Chile.

- Telenorte
- UCV Televisión
- Televisión Nacional de Chile
- Universidad de Chile Televisión
- Universidad Católica de Chile Televisión

However, this edition marked the debut of Canal 9, the secondary channel of Televisión Nacional de Chile, which began its experimental transmissions in 1986.
