= 1982 Chilean telethon =

Charity event

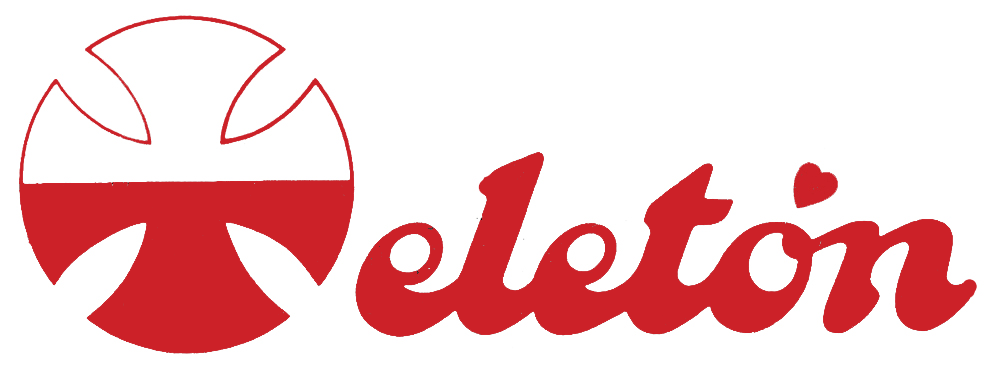
Chilean Telethon's logo

The 1982 Chilean telethon was the fifth version of the solidarity campaign conducted in Chile, which took place on the 10th and 11 December 1982.

The theme of this edition was "The Last Step, The Most Important", as it was supposed to be the last time the telethon would be produced as it was originally estimated that only 5 editions would be needed, but because of economic needs others would follow, after a 3-year gap. The poster boy was Francisco Muñoz. It was performed at the Teatro Casino Las Vegas in Santiago. The goal was achieved with the sum of $263,402,022.

== Sponsors ==
Aceite Chef; AFP Santa María; Agua Mineral Cachantún; Almacenes París; Banco de Chile; Cecinas La Preferida; Coca-Cola; Cola Cao; Chicle Bingo de Dos en Uno	Chocolates Costa; Conservas Doña Clara; Flavor Aid; Helados Bresler; Johnson's Clothes; Jugos y Néctares Watt's; Leche Soprole; Mantequilla Sureña; Multitiendas Din	Nescafé; Odontine; Pilsener Cristal; Productos Kodak; Productos Yely; Té Supremo; Vinos Santa Carolina; Zapatillas North Star

== Transmission ==
- Telenorte
- UCV Televisión
- Televisión Nacional de Chile
- Teleonce Universidad de Chile
- Universidad Católica de Chile Televisión
