= 2008 Chilean telethon =

Charity event

Chilean Telethon's logo

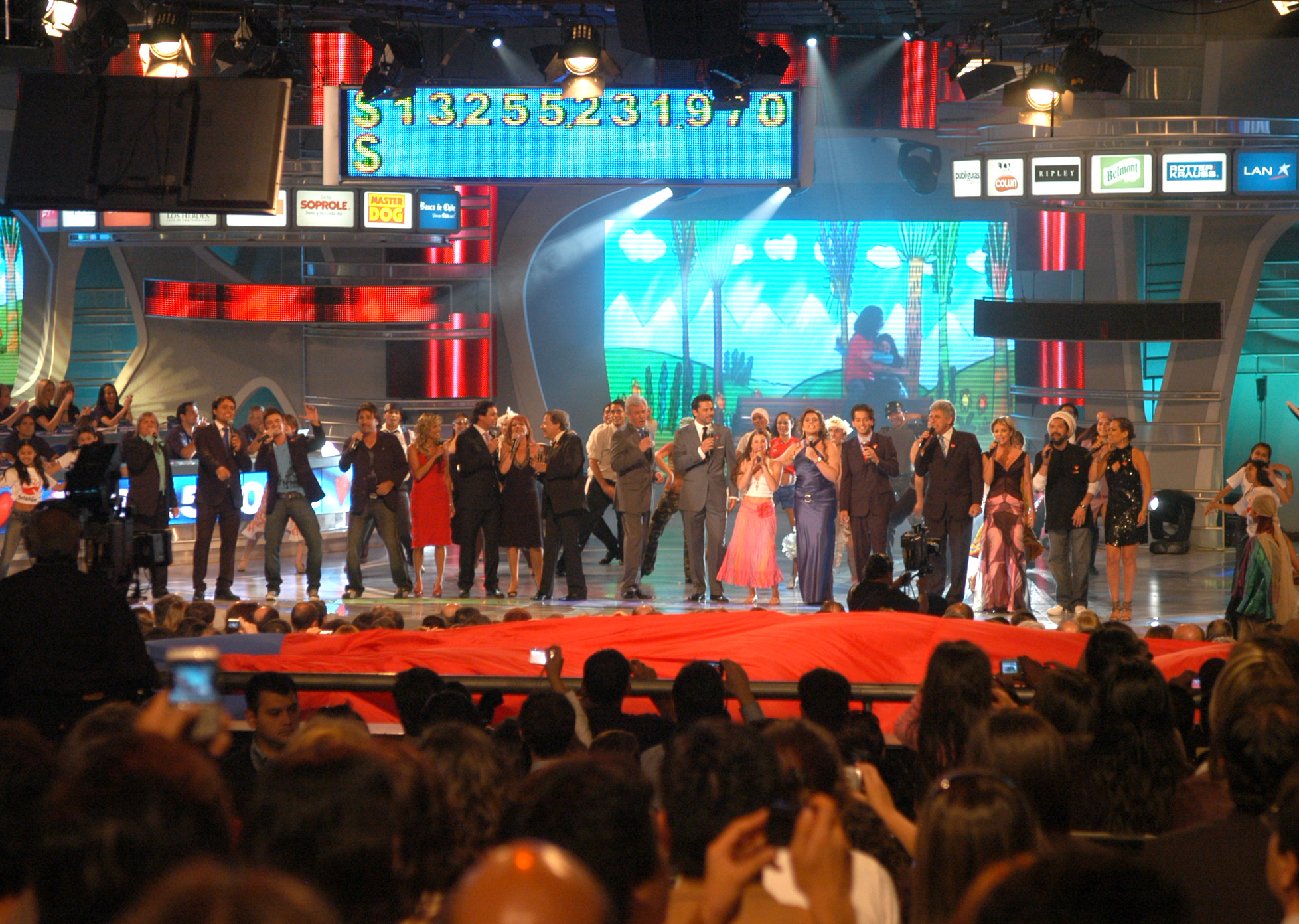
Inauguration of the 2008 telethon with the initial goal displayed

The 2008 Chilean telethon was the 22nd edition of the solidarity event in Chile, produced on 28 and 29 November 2008, which sought to raise funds for the rehabilitation of children with mobility problems.

The event, transmitted on Chilean TV channels grouped into ANATEL, began at 2200 on 28 November at the Teatro Teletón, from which most of the event was transmitted. There were also links to subsidiary events throughout the country. As in the previous 13 years, the closing ceremony of Telethon 2008 took place at the National Stadium of Chile. This ceremony started at 2200 on the next day and took the form of a great show in which Chilean and international artists participated.

The official slogan of this campaign was "Thanks to you, we can continue" and the focus was on commemorating the 30th anniversary of the first telethon, held in 1978. In this edition Catalina Aranda was chosen as the poster girl.

With nearly 29 hours of uninterrupted transmission, ending at 0251 on 30 November, it became the longest version in the history of the Telethon. The final amount raised was CL$ 22,533,294,849 (approx. US$39 million), almost 70% above the original goal of CL$13,255,231,970, making it the most successful Telethon since 1994. Around $8,000,000,000 was collected in only 7 hours.

During the campaign, Luis Haro set a new world record by playing tennis for more than 60 hours to support the cause.

It was the last Telethon under the first governorship of Michelle Bachelet.

== Background ==
After the success achieved during the Telethon 2007 campaign - and after 30 years of existence - the solidarity campaign decided to mark some milestones in the new edition of 2008. Don Francisco (Mario Kreutzberger), the presenter and leader of the event, stated in May 2008 that the principal objective of the campaign would be to show the success achieved during its three decades of existence through the testimonies of health professionals, patients and their families, as well as the artists and all those who had actively participated.

The leaders of the Telethon Foundation urged people to increase donations during the event, since because of the presidential election scheduled for December 2009 no event was scheduled for that year.

In October the Telethon Foundation announced two large projects that it would be bringing together during this campaign. The first would be the enlarging of the Telethon Institute in Santiago, which was in the evaluation stage with the Regional Metropolitan Government. The second would be the renovation of the Telethon Theatre, marking the bicentennial of the founding of Chile. The plans were for the construction of a new area with 1,600 seats, with space and facilities to accommodate any number of artists. In addition there would be an underground area of four floors, an event centre and a nine-storey tower.

The campaign would also seek to collect funds for the construction of four rehabilitation institutes in the cities of Calama, Coihaique, Copiapó and Valdivia. Although Telethon 2007 had provided a considerable sum for the construction of the Telethon Institute in Calama, various problems had delayed the project. Some days before the Telethon event the government, through the Ministry of Social Welfare, donated the land for the centres at Calama and Coihaique.

== The Campaign ==
In early June the Telethon Foundation launched a competition called "Painting the Telethon" under the patronage of the Ministry of Education and the Faculty of Arts in the University of Chile and the sponsorship of various companies. The competition sought bring the campaign closer to young children of pre-school and junior school age, entering the best work into the promotional campaign of Telethon 2008. The last day of entry was 11 July and the prize- giving was on 19 August.

The public launch of Telethon 2008 had been scheduled for 30 May in the "Benjamín Vicuña Mackenna" school in Santiago with Don Francisco. However, the previous day, the Government of Chile announced a period of official mourning for the air accident in Panama that cost the lives of the then Director General of the Carabineros, José Alejandro Bernales, and another 10 people. Therefore the Foundation decided to cancel this event and launch the campaign privately.

During August, when Chile was celebrating "Solidarity Month", Telethon launched an advertising campaign in various media to thank all those who had made possible the development and growth of the institution during its 30 years of existence. The campaign, named "National Pride", extended through the whole of August, delivering the message "Thanks to you" to everyone who had taken part. Members of the Telethon Institute for Children's Rehabilitation travelled Chile from north to south giving thanks to the community, the regional governments and the communications media. Starting that month, advertising spots on television broadcast the phrase "Thanks to you and all Chileans for the gift of these first 30 years of Telethon".

The official launch of Telethon 2008 finally took place on 3 September in the Telethon Theatre. In attendance were the senior authorities of the Institution, government representatives, the communications media, artists, and various people linked to charitable work. During the event Catalina Aranda, a girl of 11, was introduced as the poster girl for the campaign. The anthem "Gracias a tí" (Eng:Thanks to you), composed by Alberto Plaza and Mario Guerrero, was sung by well-known Chilean artists. The publicity campaign that would run during the following weeks in the communications media was developed by the Prolam, Young & Rubicam Publicity Agency; the Chilean film-maker Andrés Wood also took part.

In addition, on 5 September the programme "Telethon Ambassadors" was introduced. This initiative was organised by the Telethon Foundation and sought to make this innovative social marketing project into an inclusive project of corporate social responsibility. The event, put on in the Telethon Theatre, was attended by workers from the campaign's sponsoring companies, who were designated as official representatives of the Foundation within their companies with the goal of actively supporting the creation and development of promotional initiatives for Telethon 2008 in their workplace.

== Final stage ==
Although the solidarity campaign was officially introduced in September, after which advertisements could be seen promoting the event, the Telethon 2008 campaign was relaunched on 27 October from the Hyatt Hotel Santiago, with the presence of Don Francisco and various Chilean artists. The relaunch, which commenced immediately after the municipal elections, marked the final stage of the advertising campaign of this edition.

During that event the structure of the show, to be televised on 28 and 29 November, was made known. It would include numerous Chilean and international artists and the popular sections like "Vedetón" (Cabaret), "Bailetón" (Dance-a-thon), and "Levántate papito" (Get Up, Daddy), as well as comedy acts and a showball match organized by the Chilean ex-footballer Iván Zamorano. Within this plan a huge advertising sign would be inaugurated at midday on 28 October in part of Plaza Baquedano, a traditional meeting place in Santiago, to display the days and seconds until the event was to begin.

During November, the traditional Telethon Tour spread across the country, headed by Don Francisco and largely supported by various entertainers and artists who came along voluntarily. On the tour a number of occurrences filled the front pages of the daily papers. The inauguration of the Rehabilitation Centre in Valdivia for 2010 was announced, and in the city of Puerto Montt a woman made a karate attack by a woman on the guitarist of the group Chancho en Piedra during a song. Hours before the start of the telethon, the businessman Pedro Lizana said that "the telethon is a national disgrace, because disability is a concern of the state and is not a spectacle", similar accusations to those made by the communist leader Gladys Marín in 2002.

== Entertainers ==
=== Comperes ===
As in all previous shows, the event was presented by Don Francisco, accompanied by presenters from the different Chilean television companies transmitting the programme.

The presenters nominated by each station affiliated with ANATEL were:

- Rafael Araneda - Chilean National Television
- Felipe Camiroaga - Chilean National Television
- Leo Caprile - Chilevisión
- Claudia Conserva - RED Televisión
- Julián Elfenbein - Chilevisión
- Eva Gómez - Chilevisión
- Luis Jara - Channel 13
- Vivi Kreutzberger - Channel 13
- Cecilia Bolocco (only in the National Stadium)
- Sergio Lagos - Channel 13
- Kike Morandé - MEGA
- Javier Olivares - UCV Televisión
- Ana María Polo - MEGA
- Andrea Ruoppolo - RED Televisión
- Tonka Tomicic - Chilean National Television
- Juan Carlos Valdivia - RED Televisión
- Daniel Valenzuela - Telecanal
- José Miguel Viñuela - MEGA
- Antonio Vodanovic - at that time did not have a contract with any TV company

Also as in previous editions five entertainers presented live from different cities:

- Soledad Onetto - Channel 13 - from Arica to Copiapó
- Catalina Palacios - Chilevisión - from La Serena to Santiago
- Karen Doggenweiler - Chilean National Television - from Santiago to Concepción
- Magdalena Montes - MEGA - from Concepción to Ancud
- Giancarlo Petaccia - MEGA - from Coihaique to Punta Arenas

=== Artists from Chile and other countries ===
Among the artists participating in Telethon 2008 were:

- (Argentina) Axel
- (Chile) Chancho en Piedra
- (Puerto Rico) Elvis Crespo
- (Chile) Beto Cuevas
- (Chile) Cecilia
- (Puerto Rico) Daddy Yankee
- (Mexico) Pedro Fernández
- (Puerto Rico) Luis Fonsi
- (Chile) Myriam Hernández
- (Chile) La Noche
- (Spain) Enrique Iglesias
- (Chile) Illapu
- (Chile) Stefan Kramer
- (Venezuela) Ricardo Montaner
- (Chile) Natalino
- (Chile) Cristián Henríquez ("Rupertina")
- (Chile) Álvaro Salas
- (Puerto Rico) Tito "El Bambino"

== Running order ==
All times expressed in local (Chile continental) time (UTC-3)

Time	Section	Content and musical acts
22:00 - 01:20	Opening	The event commenced with a tribute to Telethon, marking 30 years since the inauguration of the solidarity campaign. The official theme song was performed by Mario Guerrero, Gloria Simonetti, Quique Neira, and Vanessa Aguilera among other Chilean artists. Then Don Francisco spoke with feeling. After this the President, Michelle Bachelet, spoke, handing over her donation and encouraging Chileans to support the great solidarity cause. The comperes and the call handlers were then introduced, followed by the humour of Stefan Kramer and Alvaro Salas. Before moving on to the next part of the show, Felipe Camiroaga presented the much-loved Cuban-American lawyer Ana Maria Polo, who said she felt very excited about the solidarity cause. Musical acts: Mario Guerrero, Douglas, Juan Carlos Duque, Pollo Fuentes, Gloria Simonneti, Quique Neira - Gracias a tí, podemos seguir; Pedro Fernandez - Solo tu / Me encantas; Natalino - Ángel del Pasado
01:20 - 03:30	30 years of Humour	This section, presented by Leo Caprile, Tomka Tomicic, Pollo Valdivia, Kike Morande and Rafael Araneda, featured 30 years of humour. Álvaro Salas introduced comedy acts that had appeared on previous Telethons such as: Antonio Vodanovic and Patricia Maldonado; "La cuatro dientes"Gloria Benavides; and Professor Salomon and Don Francisco as "Tutu tutu". Also returning to the show was the comedy team of Don Francisco, Luís Jara and Mandolino.
03:30 - 05:40	Dance-a-thon	This section was presented by Vivi Kreutzberger, Jose Miguel Viñuela, Julián Elfenbain, Luís Jara, Sergio Lagos and Rafael Araneda, and was broadcast from Teatro Caupolicán. Vivi Kreutzberger and Rafaela Carrá began the dancing, and then the 30 participants were introduced, including Willy Sabor, Renata Bravo, Alejandro Chávez, Pancho del Sur, and other celebrities. The judging panel consisted of Ricarte Soto, Raquel Argandoña and Italo Pasalaccua. The winning couple was Willy Sabor and Sarita Vazquez.
05:40 - 07:10	Cabaret	This section was led by Kike Morande, Juan Carlos Valdivia and Felipe Camiroaga. It included a tribute to 30 years of the Cabaret, and dance performances by Daniela Campos and Andrea Dellacasa. Comedy performers were Mauricio Flores with Francesca Cigna, Gisela Molineros and Patricia Cofre. Also appearing were the character Checopete The Poet and the model Pamela Diaz. Musical acts: Garras de amor - Gotitas de lluvia
07:10 - 08:00	Chile Sunrise	Led by Rafael Araneda and Kike Morande, this section came from Valparaíso, a "breakfast" to rouse all Chileans, with a "freitón" and donations. There were also reports from branches of the Bank of Chile and stories of fundraising activities. Musical acts: Los Afuerinos - Cuecas
08:00 - 08:30	Telethon News	Juan José Lavin, Karina Alvarez and José Luís Reppening. Round-up of the main news of this solidarity day.
08:30 - 10:55	Chile awakes	The morning section began with music from leading Chilean chefs. It was led by Vivi Kreutzberger, Tomka Tomicic, Sergio Lagos, Claudia Conserva, Eva Gomez and Ana María Polo. Breakfasts and donations were televised from different cities in the country. Pledges from the Líder and Ripley companies were announced (see below, "Pledges"). Musical acts: Los charros de Lumaco - How could I stop loving you
10:55 - 12:30	Get Up, Daddy	This began with tributes to leading children's programmes such as Cachureos and Mundo Magico with the participation of TV celebrities Martin Carcamo, Fernando Godoy, Gianella Marengo and the girls of BKN - Vanessa Aguilera, Camila Lopez, Vesta Lugg and Paulina Prohaska. There was a short presentation with Marcelo Hernandez showing some of the main themes of the Cachureos programme, and the section finished with "Celebra la vida" presented by BKN and Amango. Musical acts: Homenaje a programas infantiles- Cachureos /Mundo Magico /Profesor Rosa; Banda de la Fuerza Aerea de Chile; Amango - Yo quiero volar; BKN - No voy a cambiar /Donde nos van a ganar; Cachureos - Himno de Cachureos /Las chica yeye /La mosca /Congelao; Gabriela Erns, Javier Castillo, Felipe Morales y Magdalena Muller - Celebra la vida
12:30 - 14:26	Futshow	A section led by Fernando Solabarrieta, presented in the Teatro Caupolicán. There were a red team and a white team, composed of ministers and sports players. The commentators were Pedro Carcuro and Aldo Shiappacasse.
14:26 - 15:00	News	Carola Urrejola, Felipe Vidal and Mónica Perez
15:00 - 18:00	Best of the Best	This section began with a musical introduction featuring the jury members - Patricia Maldonado, Julia Vial, Francisca García Huidobro and Fernanda Hansen. The candidates included Pedro Yadsel, Carlos Casseli, Ramón Farías, Fernando Godoy, Guido Vequiola and Carlos Embri. Also taking part were Felipe Camiroaga with his character "Luciano Bello"; the presenter of Buenos dias a todos, Patricio Frez; and Daniel Sagues doing an imitation of Luís Dimas. Musical acts: Ricardo Montaner - The Power of Love
18:00 - 21:59	Stellar	This was the final section from the Teatro Teletón. It began with music from Los Maipucitos and Chilean folk groups. Inspiring stories were told about rehabilitation and the last reports from the regions were transmitted. Musical acts: Maipucitos y grupos folcloricos - mix de cuecas; Nueva Ola - Peter Rock, Luís Dimas, Luz Eliana, Germán Casas; Musical de los 80 - Balija Diplomatica, Juán Antonio Labra and Celeste Carballo; Gloria Benavides - success medley with her characters.; Douglas and Andrés de León with the Telethon Choir - Todo se puede Lograr
News broadcasts on each channel (22:00-23:00)
23:00 - 03:51	Closing	The closing section began with Luís Jara singing Luís Miguel's "Dream Song". The fundraising target was reached at about 01:40, and the final total at 03:47 was $22,533,294,849. Musical acts: Enrique Iglesias - Dónde están corazón / LLoro por tí / Dímelo; Ricardo Montaner - Las cosas son como son / En el último lugar del mundo; Illampú - Candombe para José / Vuelvo; Chancho en piedra Condor; Axel - Tú amor por siempre / Celebra la vida; Tito el Bambino - El Tra / Flow Natural / En la disco; Pedro Fernandez - Perdón / Me encantas; Cecilia - Baño de mar a medianoche; Luís Fonsí - ¿Quién te dijo eso? / No me doy por vencido; Los Jaivas - Mira niñita / Todos juntos; Rupertina; Bafochi; Elvis Crespo - Suavemente / Pintame; Miriam Hernandez - Dónde estará mi primavera / Vuela muy alto; Natalino - Desde que te ví; Ballet Teletón - medley de exitos bailables de todos los tiempos; La Noche - Que nadie se entere / Es el amor; Beto Cuevas - Vuelvo / El duelo; Daddy Yankee - Pasarela / Llamado de emergencia / Ella me levantó

== Transmission Information ==
The event was produced and broadcast by the television companies affiliated to ANATEL:

- Channel 13
- Chilevisión
- Mega
- Red Televisión
- Telecanal
- TVN
- UCV Televisión

To these should be added Más Canal 22, which broadcast the first hours of the event until 01.20 and the final part from 23.00 on 29 November. Chile National Television transmitted the entire event internationally, and it could also be seen live on the official website. The simultaneous transmission was only suspended between 22.00 and 23.00 hours when each channel transmitted its own programmes and/or newscast.

== Financial contributions ==
=== Sponsoring companies ===
As in previous years all the sponsoring companies made their contribution in a single donation. The amount contributed came to CLP$3,243,574,119, equivalent to 24.4% of the final amount.

Company	Product	Amount in pesos
Aceite Belmont	Cooking oils	88,113,457
Banco de Chile	Banking	510,024,503
Cachantún	Mineral water	337,076,449
Campanario	Andean brandy	337,076,449
Cerveza Cristal	Beer	337,076,449
Pepsi	Soft drinks	337,076,449
CEPECH	Educational services	90,998,590
Claro	Mobile telephones	115,152,390
Colún	Dairy products	101.320.510
Confort	Toilet paper	182,000,000
LadySoft	Sanitary towels	182,000,000
Johnson's	Department store	150,264,213
LAN Airlines	Airline	120,000,000
Livean	Powdered drinks	190,000,000
Lucchetti	Pasta products	190,000,000
Los Héroes	Compensation fund	(unclear on Spanish Wikipedia entry)
Loto	Lotteries	(unclear on Spanish Wikipedia entry)
Mabe	Domestic electrical goods	
Master Dog	Dogfood	81,709,656
Omo	Detergents	110,000,000
Pan Ideal	Baked products	104,918,558
Pampers	Babies' nappies	100,000,000
Publiguías	Yellow pages guides	87,777,007
Ripley	Department stores	300,000,000
Rotter & Krauss	Opticians	86,194,986
Sodimac	Retail shops	400,662,626
Soprole	Dairy products	160,288,875
Tapsin	Pharmaceuticals	90,235,540
Té Supremo	Tea	92,000,000
Pinturas Tricolor	Industrial paints	90,381,477

=== Pledges ===
- Líder supermarkets would donate $100 million if 400,000 items were purchased between 09.00 and 16.00 hours. At 15.30 the original goal was passed and it was then announced that the donation would be doubled if there were another 400,000 purchases before the shops closed.
- Ripley would donate a Lokomat gait therapy device to an extra rehabilitation centre if 40,000 purchases were made during Saturday. The goal was reached and then they would donate another machine if 70,000 purchases were made. At 20.00 hours they indicated that their shops would stay open later than normal, and that if the new target was reached they would also donate an extra CLP$50,000,000 to the Foundation. This also was fulfilled.
- Sodimac Homecentre would donate CLP$60 million if more than 2,000 people with tools gathered in the shop in the area of Avenida Vicuña Mackenna and Avenida Circunvalación Américo Vespucio between 14.00 and 17.00 hours on Saturday. The goal was achieved at 18.30 hours and the $60,000,000 was delivered to the Telethon.

=== Auctions ===
As was done every year, the traditional auctions were arranged of objects donated to the Telethon. The results this year were:

Object	Description	Initial price	Final donation
Baseball cap from the Roland Garros Tournament	Autographed by Roger Federer and Rafael Nadal	$500,000	$2,100,000
Stone moai	Carved by the father of Hotuiti Teao	$50,000	$200,000
Sombrero	Donated by Fernando Godoy	$50,000	$60,000
Tennis racket and bag	Donated by Fernando González	$1,000,000	$3,200,000
Poster of the film Driven	Autographed by Cristián de la Fuente	$100,000	$300,000
Picture	Donated by Pablo Millas	$300,000	$360,000
Polo shirt of the programme El último pasajero	Used and donated by Martín Cárcamo	$20,000	$115,000
Beijing Olympic souvenirs	Bought by Soledad Bacarreza in the Beijing Olympics 2008	$15,000	$68,000
Ray Ban sunglasses	Used by Ignacio Gutiérrez	$50,000	$200,000
Metal Jacket	Was used by Raquel Argandoña in the Festival de Viña del Mar, 1981	$1,000,000	$9,500,000
Barbie Doll	Belonged to Andrea Molina	$20,000	$90,000
Superman socks	Used by Jordi Castell	$20,000	$110,000

=== Private contributions ===
The largest donations that day, indeed in the history of the Telethon up to then, were handed over by the businessmen Leonardo Farkas and José Luis Nazar, who each gave CLP$1,000 million (about USD$1.5 million). Both donations were in their own names, not on behalf of their businesses. Nevertheless, the mining entrepreneur (Farkas) admitted in the newspaper Las Últimas Noticias that $50 million of the $1,000 million came from the Santa Fe mining company.

== See also ==
- Teletón Chile
- Chile helps Chile
