= 2016 Chilean telethon =

Charity event

Logo of Teletón (Chilean telethon)

The 2016 Chilean telethon (Spanish: Teletón 2016) is the 28th version of the solidarity campaign to be held in Chile, which wants to raise funds for the rehabilitation of children with motor disabilities. It will be held from the Teatro Teletón from 22:00 on Friday, December 2 until 21:00 on Saturday, December 3 and from Julio Martínez National Stadium from 22:00 in its final stretch. The child symbol or "ambassador" of this edition is Vicente Jopia. Its slogan is El abrazo de Chile (The hug of Chile).

The event ended fulfilling the goal with a final count of CLP32,040,179,848.

== Broadcasting ==
The transmission of the event will be held jointly by all television channels grouped in the National Association of Television of Chile (ANATEL):

- Telecanal
- La Red
- UCV Television
- TVN/TV Chile (international)
- Mega
- Chilevisión
- Canal 13 (Chile)/13i (international)

=== Radios ===
- ADN Radio Chile
- Radioactiva
- Radio Agricultura
- Radio Bio-Bio
- Radio Carolina
- Radio Cooperativa
- Radio Disney
- Radio La Clave
- Play FM
- Radio Pudahuel
- Tele13 Radio
- Radio Digital FM
- Radio Positiva FM
- Radio Portales

== Hosts ==
- Mario Kreutzberger Don Francisco
- Rafael Araneda
- Cecilia Bolocco
- Diana Bolocco
- Martín Cárcamo
- Carolina de Moras
- Karen Doggenweiler
- Julián Elfenbein
- Ignacio Franzani
- Luis Jara
- Kike Morandé
- Katherine Salosny
- Tonka Tomicic
- Juan Carlos Valdivia
- Julia Vial
- José Miguel Viñuela
- Antonio Vodanovic
- Andrés Caniulef
- Jean Philippe Cretton
- María Luisa Godoy
- Eva Gómez
- Amaro Gómez-Pablos
- Cristián Sánchez
- Karen Paola Bejarano
- Jennifer Warner
- Scarleth Cárdenas

== Guest artists ==
- J Balvin
- Prince Royce
- Río Roma
- Toco Para Vos
- Alkilados
- Cali y El Dandee
- Gente de Zona
- Diego Topa
- Luciano Pereyra
- Américo
- Luis Jara
- Valentín Trujillo
- Power Peralta
- C-Funk
- Loreto Canales
- Augusto Schuster
- Consuelo Schuster
- Luis Pedraza
- Denise Rosenthal
- Chancho en Piedra
- Tommy Rey
- Sonora Palacios
- Franco de Vita
- Paty Cantú
- Jorge González
- Orfeón de Carabineros de Chile
- Los del Río
- Daniela Castillo
- Douglas
- Juan David Rodríguez
- Johnny Sky
- Los Viking's 5
- Kudai
- Combo Tortuga
- Tomo como Rey
- Sepamoya
- Garras de Amor
- Mario Guerrero
- Leo Rey
- Cachureos
- Cantando aprendo a hablar
- El circo de Pastelito y Tachuela Chico
- La Otra Fe
- Simoney Romero
- Leandro Martínez
- Carolina Soto
- Álvaro Véliz
- Lucía Covarrubias
- Paloma Soto
- Francisca Sfeir
- Hueso Carrizo
- Bafochi
- Inti-Illimani Histórico
- Madvanna
- María Colores
- Rigeo
- Nahuel Penissi
- Noche de Brujas
- Jordan

== Sponsors ==
- Banco de Chile
- Babysec
- Cotidian
- LadySoft
- Nova
- Belmont
- Bilz y Pap
- Cachantún
- Cerveza Cristal
- Watt's
- Cannes
- Claro
- Colún
- Copec
- Daily Gotas
- LATAM Airlines
- Omo
- Ripley
- Sodimac
- Soprole
- Tapsin
- Superior
- Té Supremo
