= 2015 Chilean telethon =

Charity event

Logo of Teletón (Chilean telethon)

The 2015 Chilean telethon (Spanish: Teletón 2015) is the 27th version of the solidarity campaign to be held in Chile, which sought to raise funds for the rehabilitation of children with motor disabilities. Its slogan was La hacemos todos (We do it all). It was held from the Teatro Teletón from 22:00 on Friday, 27 November until 21:00 on Saturday November 28 and from Julio Martínez National Stadium from 22:00 in its final stretch. The event ended fulfilling the goal with a final count of CLP30,601,978,621.

== Release ==
The official release of the campaign was 1 October at the Teatro Teletón, where it presented the anthem of the campaign, including the slogan Teletón, We do it all (Teletón, la hacemos todos), played by Mario Guerrero, Consuelo Schuster, Tommy Rey, Américo, Shamanes, Zaturno, Naykon, Karnasa, Joe Vasconcellos and Natalino.

== Broadcasting ==
The transmission of the event held jointly by all television channels grouped in the National Association of Television of Chile (ANALTEL):

- Telecanal
- La Red
- UCV Television
- TVN/TV Chile (international)
- Mega
- Chilevisión
- Canal 13 (Chile)/13i (international)

=== Radios ===
- ADN Radio Chile
- Radioactiva
- Radio Agricultura
- Radio Bio-Bio
- Radio Carolina
- Radio Cooperativa
- Radio Disney
- Play FM
- Radio Pudahuel
- Tele13 Radio
- Radio Digital FM
- Radio Positiva FM
- Radio Portales

== Hosts ==
- Mario Kreutzberger (Don Francisco)
- Rafael Araneda
- Cecilia Bolocco
- Diana Bolocco
- Martín Cárcamo
- Carolina de Moras
- Karen Doggenweiler
- Julián Elfenbein
- Ignacio Franzani
- Luis Jara
- Kike Morandé
- Katherine Salosny
- Tonka Tomicic
- Juan Carlos Valdivia
- Julia Vial
- José Miguel Viñuela
- Antonio Vodanovic
- Andrés Caniulef
- Jean Philippe Cretton
- María Luisa Godoy
- Eva Gómez
- Amaro Gómez-Pablos
- Goferk (Youtuber)

== Guest artists ==
- Miguel Bosé
- Diego Torres
- Yuri
- Axel
- Luis Fonsi
- Osmani García
- Noche de Brujas
- Américo
- Carlos Vives
- Stefan Kramer
- Power Peralta
- Los Atletas de la Risa
- Francisca Valenzuela
- Sofía Reyes

== Sponsors ==
- Banco de Chile
- Babysec
- Confort
- LadySoft
- Superior
- Belmont
- Bilz y Pap
- Cachantún
- Cerveza Cristal
- Watt's
- Cannes
- Claro
- Colún
- Copec
- Daily Gotas
- LAN Airlines
- Lucchetti
- Omo
- Ripley
- Sodimac
- Soprole
- Tapsin
- Té Supremo

== Controversy ==
On October 28, the National Economic Prosecutor denounced Empresas CMPC of having colluded with competitor SCA to allocate market shares and fixing prices for the sale of products from the category of tissue paper, which quickly became known as the Confort Cartel (toilet paper being known as confort in Chile). For this reason, this company decided to suspend the advertising of these three brands associated with the campaign; while representatives of the foundation said that CMPC will maintain its contribution, but avoid any public display to prevent harm to the Telethon, given the prestige that the collusion case has caused to its corporate image.
