= 1985 Chilean telethon =

Charity event

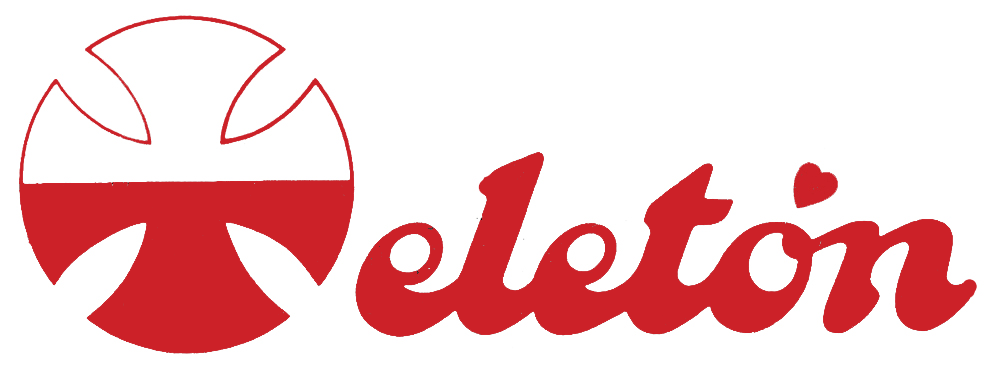
Chilean Telethon's logo

The 1985 Chilean telethon was the sixth version of the solidarity campaign conducted in Chile, which took place on 6 and 7 December 1985. The theme of this version was "The Miracle of All." The poster boy was Victor Munoz.

It was a difficult year for the Telethon's Institute and Foundation, due to the 2-year absence of the Telethon (1983 and 1984) and the earthquake that struck the central region (7.6 on the Richter scale). This was the year when Don Francisco formally launched the spin-off disaster relief telethon Chile helps Chile in response to this, and called on the nation to exert its efforts towards rebuilding Valparaiso Province and the Santiago Metropolitan Region.

Even with these difficulties, the Telethon was performed in the same style, with a surprising result of: $ 368,495,845.

== Sponsors ==
Aceite Chef; Agua Mineral Cachantún; Banco de Chile; Cecinas La Preferida; Coca-Cola; Cola Cao; Combustibles Copec; Conservas Doña Clara; Dos en Uno	Fla Vor Aid; Galletas Costa; Helados Savory; Jabón Camay; Johnson's Clothes; Leche Soprole; Nescafé; Odontine; Pastas Lucchetti; Pilsener Dorada	Pisco Control; Productos Kodak; Pre-Unic; Quesos Dos Álamos; Té Supremo; Uvasal; Vinos Santa Carolina; Yoghurt Soprole; Zapatillas North Star

== Artists ==
=== Nationals ===
Note: Many of these Chilean stars, together with athletes, TV and movie stars and news anchors from the participant radio and TV networks, were also featured as singers in the official theme song "Everyone's Miracle", composed for this year's edition by Marcelo López and Daniel Lencina, and the official music video, directed by Lopez, modeled and patterened after the famous MTVs of the Live Aid charity concert earlier that year, which made its TV premiere on 19 October - the first true ever all star MTV produced for Teleton, following the three prototype MTVs produced from 1980-1982.

- (Chile) Ginette Acevedo
- (Chile) Antonio Prieto
- (Chile) Zalo Reyes
- (Chile) Miguel Piñera
- (Chile) Luis Dimas
- (Chile) Frecuencia Mod
- (Chile) Peter Rock
- (Chile) Pachuco y la Cubanacán
- (Chile) Cristóbal
- (Chile) Claudia Muñoz
- (Chile) Alberto Plaza
- (Chile) Los Prisioneros
- (Chile) Sol y Medianoche
- (Chile) Irene Llano
- (Chile) Miguelo
- (Chile) Giolito y Su Combo
- (Chile) Patricio Renán
- (Chile) Sonora Palacios
- (Chile) Sergio Lillo
- (Chile) Jorge Rigó
- (Chile) Lucho Muñoz
- (Chile) Luz Eliana
- (Chile) Los Huasos Quincheros
- (Chile) José Alfredo Fuentes
- (Chile) Fernando Ubiergo

=== International Artistes ===
- (Italy) Nicola Di Bari
- (Spain) Alejandro Jaén
- (Dominican Republic) Charytin Goyco
- (Spain) Bravo
- (Argentina) Rubén Juárez
- (Nicaragua) Hernaldo Zúñiga
- (Spain) Emilio José
- (Argentina) Orlando Netti
- (Argentina) G.I.T.
- (Argentina) Alejandro Lerner
- (Argentina) Juan Carlos Baglietto
- Aldone
- (Argentina) Leonardo Favio
- (Colombia) Isadora
- (Argentina) Roque Narvaja
- (Argentina) Frank Victory
- (Spain) La Pequeña Compañía
- (Mexico) Armando Manzanero
- (Argentina) León Gieco
- (Uruguay) Gervasio
- (Argentina) Sandra Mihanovich
- (Portugal) Manuela Bravo

=== Comedians ===
- Jorge Romero "Firulete"
- Don Goyo
- La Desideria
- El Fatiga
- Mandolino
- Hermanos Campos
- Mino Valdez and company
- Los Eguiguren
- Checho Hirane
- Ruperto
- Hugo Varela
- Los Jaujarana
- Jappening con Ja
- Coco Legrand

=== Magazine ===
- Maitén Montenegro, showwoman
- Enrique González, magician
- Raúl Di Blasio, pianist
- National Folklorical Dance

=== In Adult Section ===
- Maggie Lay
- Maripepa Nieto
- Beatriz Alegret
- Cristina Tocco

== Transmission ==
- Telenorte
- UCV Televisión
- Televisión Nacional de Chile
- Universidad de Chile Televisión
- Universidad Católica de Chile Televisión
- Spanish International Network (SIN)

== Censorship ==
During the introduction of the singing of La Voz De Los 80's, TVN censored the broadcast and instead went to a commercial break. The other channels, though, continued to show the band as usual. Televisión Nacional de Chile condemned the actions of Los Prisoneros during this telethon, since the group was openly opposed to the Pinochet Regiment. The condemning would continue on to Teleton 2002
