= 2010 Chilean telethon =

Charity event

Chilean Telethon's logo

The 2010 Chilean telethon was the 23rd version of this telethon, the aim this year being to raise funds for the rehabilitation of children with motor disabilities. The event, which aired over 27 consecutive hours through the Chilean television channels grouped in the National Television Association (Anatel), was broadcast live from the Telethon Theatre on December 3 and 4 and from the National Stadium in its final segments, and was produced and directed by Mauricio Correa. The poster child was Cristóbal Galleguillos, born with no upper limbs and malformed legs. It is the second national telethon after the Chile helps Chile, aired in March of that year, to be broadcast in HDTV. This version was performed 2 years after the previous because in December 2009 parliamentary and presidential elections took place. This was the first telethon to be held during the first government of Sebastián Piñera and as 2010 marked the nation's bicentennial year, it marked a historic climax to a year of celebrations and television specials, with the year's edition being a gift to the millions of Chileans who had helped the campaign through the decades.

After almost 28 hours of uninterrupted transmission, the amount collected during was CL$ 18,890,559,347 (USD 39,167,654), beating, a 13.87%, the original goal. On 21 December, the Fundación Teletón's Directorate gave the final figure achieved in this campaign, reaching a total of CL$24,420,293,420 (USD50,632,995), 47.20% above the goal set.

== Sponsors ==
Company	Product/service	Amount in pesos	Amount in dollars	Amount in euros
Aceite Belmont	Oils	$95,000,000	$196,973	€146,863
Banco de Chile	Bank	$1,000,000,000	$2,073,398	€1,545,927
Campanario	Pisco	$331,086,511	$686,474	€511,836
Cerveza Cristal	Beer	$331,086,511	$686,474	€511,836
Pepsi	Soft drinks	$331,086,511	$686,474	€511,836
Nestlé Pure Life	Bottled water	$331,086,511	$686,474	€511,836
Claro	Telecommunications	$205,747,002	$426,595	€318,070
Colún	Dairy products	$108,733,244	$224,981	€168,094
Confort	Toilet paper	$260,000,000	$539,084	€401,941
LadySoft	Sanitary napkins	$260,000,000	$539,084	€401,941
Copec	Gas stations	$227,109,000	$470,887	€351,094
Daily Gotas	Artificial sweeteners	$120,000,000	$248,808	€185,511
IP Chile	Professional institute	$100,699,144	$208,789	€155,674
LAN Airlines	Airline	$210,000,000	$435,414	€324,645
Livean	Juice powder	$212,500,000	$440,597	€328,510
Lucchetti	Pastas	$212,500,000	$440,597	€328,510
Los Héroes	Benefit society	$300,000,000	$622,019	€463,778
Mabe	Home electronics	$85,722,400	$177,737	€132,521
Omo	Detergents	$119,830,000	$248,455	€185,248
Packard Bell	Computers	$100,235,431	$207,828	€154,957
Pampers	Diapers	$100,000,000	$207,340	€154,593
Ripley	Department stores	$335,000,000	$694,588	€517,886
Sodimac	Retail stores	$460,000,000	$957,910	€714,218
Soprole	Dairy products	$255,000,000	$528,717	€394,211
Tapsin	Pharmaceuticals	$100,245,933	$207,850	€154,973
Té Supremo	Tea	$112,000,000	$232,221	€173,144
