= 2004 Chilean telethon =

Charity event

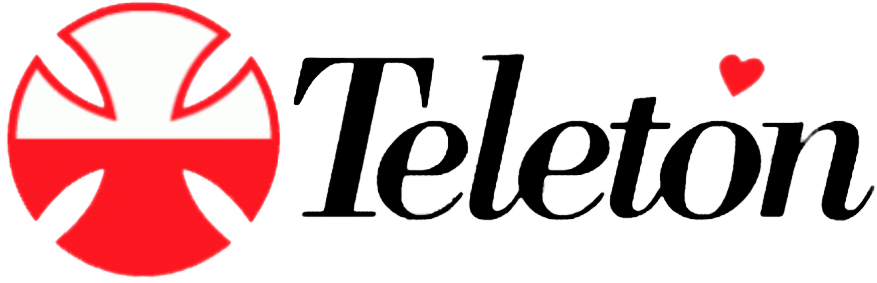
Chilean Telethon's logo

The 2004 Chilean telethon was the 19th Teletón solidarity campaign held in Chile, on 3–4 December 2004.

== News ==
=== A strong group ===
One of the many successes of the telethon was the large participation of a group of 15 well-known figures in Chile (led by former captain of the Chile national football team Iván Zamorano), who spent most of a day receiving donation phone calls from branches of Banco de Chile and from around the world, and during that period were very lively, singing, jumping, and encouraging all Chileans to join in.

== Computing ==
Time (UTC-3)	Amound in CL$
22.35 (Dec. 3)	$ 3.391.500
22.50	$ 2.047.626.430
22.50	$ 2.051.017.930
01.35 (Dec. 4)	$ 2.465.218.747
07.53	$ 2.678.588.815
10.07	$ 2.811.983.865
14.03	$ 3.874.416.811
16.33	$ 4.979.122.248
17.47	$ 5.327.495.842
19.16	$ 5.924.703.519
20.13	$ 6.752.122.008
20.59	$ 7.600.195.577
22.42	$ 7.965.316.060
23.20	$ 8.856.095.975
00.00 (Dec. 5)	$ 9.647.189.677
00.55	$ 10.753.577.401
01.22	$ 11.403.914.256

== Artists ==
=== National singers ===
- (Chile) Pablo Herrera
- (Chile) Alberto Plaza
- (Chile) (Argentina) María Jimena Pereyra
- (Chile) Leandro Martínez
- (Chile) Monserrat Bustamante
- (Chile) Karen Paola
- (Chile) Eure-K
- (Chile) Douglas
- (Chile) Daniela Castillo
- (Chile) Los Hermanos Bustos
- (Chile) Javiera Parra (singer of the 2004 theme Across a Nation)
- (Chile) Gloria Simonetti
- (Chile) Fernando Ubiergo
- (Chile) José Alfredo Fuentes
- (Chile) Azul Caribe
- (Chile) Rigeo
- (Chile) Viking 5
- (Chile) La Cubanacan
- (Chile) Kudai
- (Chile) María José Quintanilla
- (Chile) Tiro de Gracia
- (Chile) Congreso

=== Foreign singers ===
- (Argentina) Diego Torres
- (Colombia) Carlos Vives
- (Puerto Rico) Obie Bermúdez
- (Spain) Ismael Serrano
- (Colombia) Bacilos
- (Colombia) Juanes
- (Mexico) Los Tigres del Norte

=== Comedians ===
- Álvaro Salas
- Salomón y Tutu Tutu
- Sketch of actors

=== Magazine ===
- Clan Rojo
- Team Mekano
- Mauricio Israel sang "Si no te hubieras ido" (Eng: If you had not gone)
- Shrek and Iván Zamorano-Maria Alberó's Musicals.
- Rodrigo Díaz's Ciclo-dance.

=== Children's section ===
- Cachureos
- Zoolo TV
- Christell

=== Adult's section ===
- Silvina Luna
- Álvaro Ballero
- Bond Girls of Passapoga
- Pablo Vargas
- Soledad Pérez
- Lola Melnyck

== Transmission ==
- Red Televisión
- UCV Televisión
- Televisión Nacional de Chile
- Mega
- Chilevisión
- Canal 13
- Canal Regional
