= Teletón (Chile) =

Chilean charity television event

- Logo of Teletón (Chilean telethon)

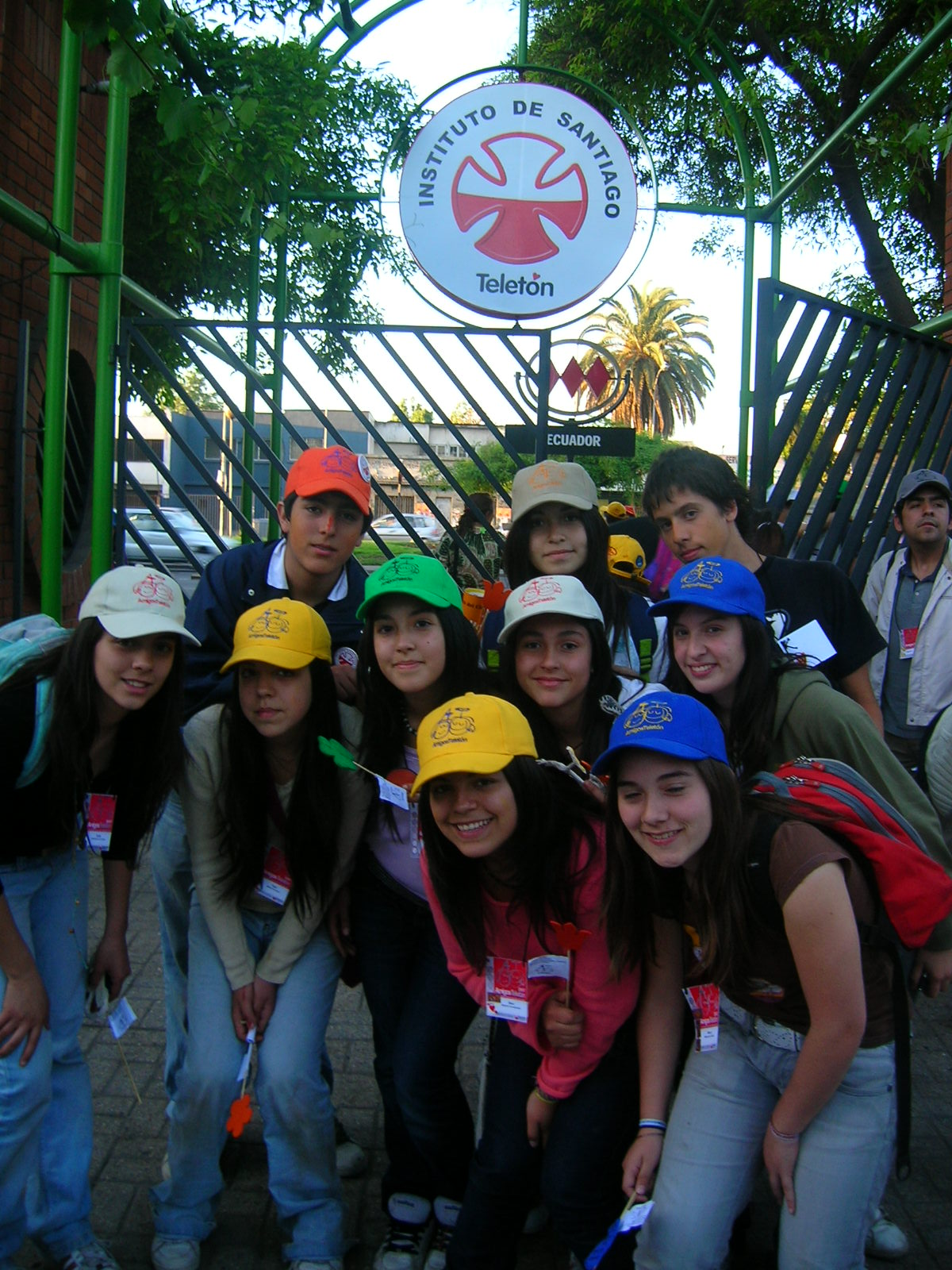
- Volunteers of Teletón in an activity developed within the framework of the charity event in Chile (2007)
- Status: Active
- Genre: Charity
- Frequency: Annually
- Location: Santiago, Chile
- Country: Chile
- Years active: 1978–1982; 1985-present
- Inaugurated: December 8, 1978; 47 years ago
- Founder: Don Francisco, Ernesto Rosenfeld (Chairman of Sociedad Pro-Ayuda al Niño Lisiado)
- Most recent: November 6-7, 2026
- Organizer: Fundación Teletón (1986-present), Sociedad Pro-Ayuda al Niño Lisiado (1978-1986)
- Website: teleton.cl

Teletón is a charity event held in Chile on a yearly basis since 1978. It is usually held during the first week of December, unless a political election occurs at the same time. The major Chilean television networks hold a 27-hour transmission, to raise funds to help children with developmental disabilities (most commonly cerebral palsy) treated at Instituto de Rehabilitación Infantil ("Infant Rehabilitation Institute") centers of the Fundación Teletón. In Chile, the transmission of Teletón is an event of national unity and, proportionately, the most widely watched telethon in the world.

Since the first telethon, over US$286 million has been raised, and 14 rehabilitation centers have been built in the cities of Arica, Iquique, Antofagasta, Calama, Copiapó, Coquimbo, Valparaíso, Santiago, Talca, Concepción, Temuco, Valdivia, Puerto Montt and Coyhaique.

During the annual event, local and worldwide stars participate in live events across the country. Teletón has been hosted by television personality Mario Kreutzberger, best known by his stage name Don Francisco, since the first event, aired in 1978. Each year, a poster child is elected to become the face of the charity.

With the exception of the initial Teletón in 1978, each year's goal is set to be exactly the total amount raised in the previous event, in the spirit of increasing the funds available to the Foundation to account for increased inflation and overall maintenance costs. Up until now, the goal has been reached and surpassed on all Teletón versions with the exception of 1995's, were the final account was roughly 12% short of that year's goal.

The Chilean Teletón model was later adopted in several other countries, where similar fundraising campaigns were established to support organizations serving children with disabilities. Participating countries have included Colombia, Peru, Panama, El Salvador, Paraguay, Ecuador, Guatemala, Honduras, Mexico, Brazil, Nicaragua, Venezuela, The United States, Bolivia, and Argentina. Many of these national telethons cooperate through the Organización Internacional de Teletones (Oritel), although Venezuela and Guatemala are not members.

== Telethons ==
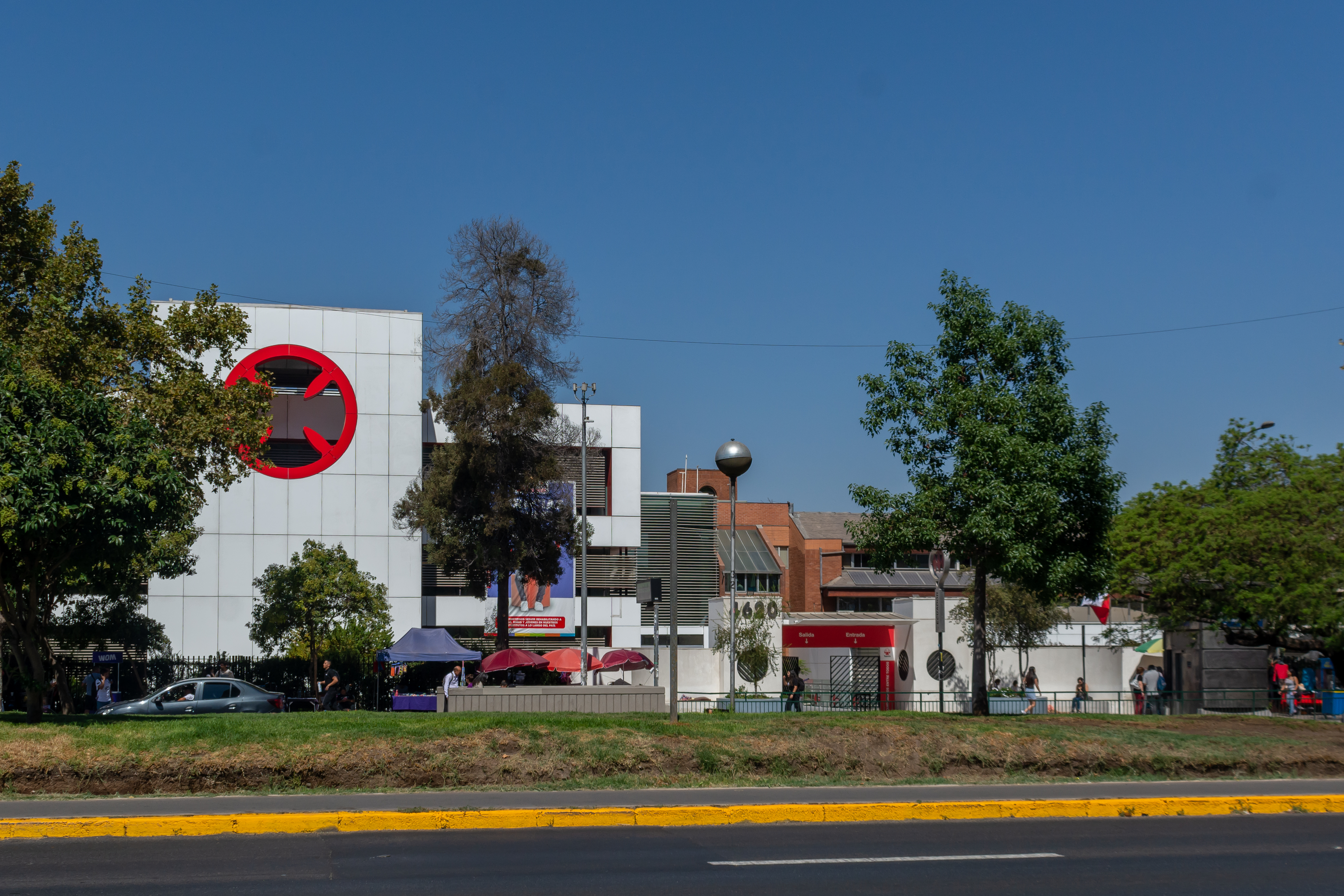
View of the Teletón Santiago rehabilitation institute.

Year	Dates	Slogan	Poster child	Goal	Donations collected^{4}	±%	US$
1978	December 8-9	Let's make the miracle happen (Logremos el milagro)	Jane Hermosilla	CL$30,790,000	CL$84,361,838	173.99	US$5,421,619
1979	November 30 - December 1	Let's repeat the Incredible (Repitamos lo increíble)	Valeria Arias	CL$84,361,838	CL$138,728,450	64.44	US$6,464,132
1980	December 5-6	Standing for hope (De pie la esperanza)	José Morales	CL$138,728,450	CL$176,420,628	27.17	US$6,245,644
1981	December 11-12	Together, everything is possible (Juntos, todo es posible)	Ana María Cortés	CL$176,420,628	CL$202,436,220	14.75	US$6,451,607
1982	December 10-11	The last step, the most important (El último paso, el más importante)	Francisco Muñoz	CL$202,436,220	CL$263,402,022	30.12	US$6,997,535
1985	December 6-7	Everybody's miracle (El milagro de todos)	Víctor Muñoz	CL$263,402,022	CL$368,495,845	39.90	US$5,118,424
1987	December 4-5	To believe in life (Para creer en la vida)	Víctor Torres	CL$368,495,845	CL$502,293,311	36.31	US$4,849,540
1988	December 2-3	It's everyone's task (Es tarea de todos)	Rodrigo Cáceres	CL$502,293,311	CL$711,712,019	41.69	US$6,193,670
1990	December 7-8	Nobody can miss (Nadie puede faltar)	Daniela Muñoz	CL$711,712,019	CL$1,153,291,010	62.04	US$6,404,372
1991	November 29-30	Thanks to you (Gracias a usted)	Ángela Castro	CL$1,153,291,010	CL$1,803,923,485	56.42	US$8,501,810
1992	November 27-28	There is so much to do (Hay tanto por hacer)	Nicolás Sánchez	CL$1,803,923,485	CL$2,874,230,697	59.33	US$11,882,333
1994	December 2-3	The commitment of Chile (El compromiso de Chile)	Loreto Manzanero	CL$2,874,230,697	CL$3,640,286,169	26.65	US$12,333,809
1995	December 1-2	Our great work (Nuestra gran obra)	Marcel Cáceres	CL$6,277,027,832	CL$5,534,774,829	-11.82	US$17,332,596
1996	December 6-7	Another step forward (Otro paso adelante)	Nicole Núñez	CL$5,534,774,829	CL$5,692,426,301	2.85	US$16,730,177
1998	December 4-5	We're all in (Todos contamos)	Scarlett Barrientos	CL$5,692,426,301	CL$6,029,912,577	5.93	US$15,990,236
2000	December 1-2	A challenge for the Chileans (Un desafío para los chilenos)	Ignacio Soto	CL$6,029,912,577	CL$6,772,445,028	12.31	US$16,727,665
2002	November 29-30	Teletón is yours (La Teletón es tuya)	Kimberly Cruz	CL$10,000,000,000	CL$10,532,480,521	5.32	US$24,513,946
2003	November 21-22	Remember, it's yours! (¡Acuérdate, es tuya!)	Camilo Valverde	CL$10,532,480,521	CL$10,600,000,000	0.64	US$24,438,268
2004	December 3-4	They depend on you (Ellos dependen de ti)	Catalina Paillamilla	CL$10,600,000,000	CL$11,403,914,256	7.58	US$25,655,022
2006	December 1-2	With all our heart (Con todo el corazón)	Kelly Rodríguez	CL$11,403,914,256	CL$11,804,425,008	3.51	US$25,094,611
2007	November 30 - December 1	You are in each step (En cada paso estás tú)	Matías Calderón	CL$11,804,425,008	CL$13,255,231,970	12.29	US$26,228,248
2008	November 28-29	Thanks to you, we can keep going (Gracias a ti, podemos seguir)	Catalina Aranda	CL$13,255,231,970	CL$16,589,850,127	25.16	US$32,826,487
2010	December 3-4	Chile, one heart (Chile, un solo corazón)	Cristóbal Galleguillos	CL$16,589,850,127	CL$18,890,559,347	13.87	US$39,205,104
2011	December 2-3	With the strength of heart (Con la fuerza del corazón)	Isidora Guzmán	CL$18,890,559,347	CL$21,735,065,277	15.06	US$42,308,343
2012	November 30 - December 1	Fully heart (Puro corazón)	Sebastián Montalván	CL$21,735,065,277	CL$25,445,520,245	17.07	US$53,017,023
2014	November 28-29	We are all (Somos todos)	Matías Torres	CL$25,445,520,245	CL$28,176,895,804	10.73	US$58,707,982
2015	November 27-28	We do it all (La hacemos todos)	Antonella Alcántara	CL$28,176,895,804	CL$30,601,978,621	8.61	US$42,740,194
2016	December 2-3	The hug of Chile (El abrazo de Chile)	Vicente Jopia	CL$30,601,978,621	CL$32,040,178,848	4.70	US$47,748,585
2017	December 1-2	Everyone's Hug (El abrazo de Todos)	Amylee Olivia	CL$32,040,178,848	CL$32,522,991,111	1,50	US$50,398,238
2018	November 30 - December 1	The Gift of Everyone (El Regalo de Todos)	Florencia Catalán	CL$32,522,991,111	CL$32,851,438,341	1,01	US$41,064,297
2020	April 3–4 (Note: It was going to take place on November 29-30, 2019, but due to the protests in Chile, it was decided to postpone it to April 3-4, 2020.)	#AccompaniesYou (#TeAcompaña)	Bastian Pinto	No goal	CL$34,703,593,204		US$40,096,601
2021	December 3-4	#Everyday (#TodosLosDías)	Ian Vega and Renata Ulloa	CL$34,703,593,204	CL$35,248,655,075		US$44,060,818
2022	November 4-5 (Note: Originally, the 2022 campaign was going to take place on December 2-3, but due to the dates of the 2022 FIFA World Cup matches in Qatar, it was decided that the solidarity campaign would take place on November 4-5.)	It does us all good, every day (Nos Hace bien a todos, Todos los días)	Maithe Ilabaca	CL$35,248,655,075	CL$37,327,475,057	1,06	US$41,806,772
2023	November 10-11 (Note: Originally, the 2023 campaign was going to take place on December 1-2, but due to the preparations for the 2023 Parapan American Games in Santiago, it was decided that the solidarity campaign would take place on November 10 and 11.)	It does us good, Every day (Nos hace bien, Todos los días)	Amanda Meléndez	CL$37,327,475,057	CL$38,044,459,976		US$
2024	November 8-9	Together, Every day (Juntos, Todos los días)	Chris Lindsay Doran	CL$38,044,459,976	CL$40,502,617,946		US$
2025	November 28-29	Your heart is the heart of the Telethon, every day (Tu corazón es el corazón de la Teletón, Todos los días)	Alan García Gaete	CL$40,502,617,946	CL$44,253,268,546		US$
2026	November 6-7	Join what unites us (Súmate a lo que nos une)	Iaán Calderón	CL$44,253,268,546	CL$46,204,313,130		US$

== See also ==
- Chile helps Chile—2010 telethon in response to the 2010 Chile earthquake and a 1985 special about the 1985 Chilean Earthquake
