= 1979 Chilean telethon =

Charity event

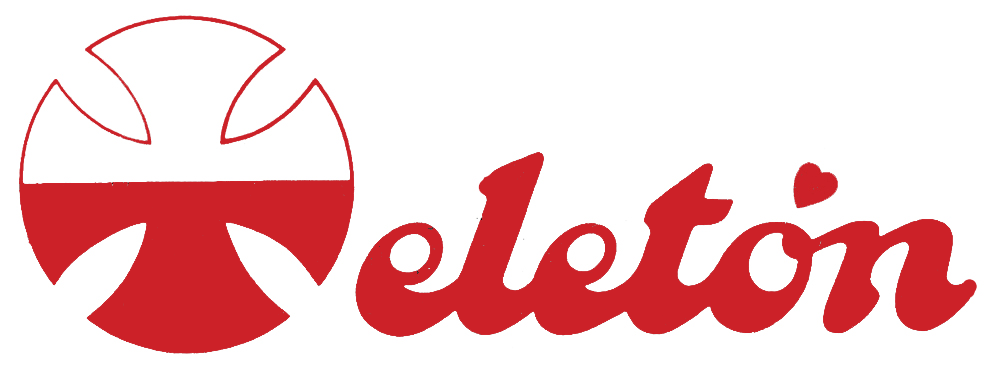
Chilean Telethon's logo

The 1979 Chilean telethon was the second version of the solidarity campaign held in Chile, which took place on November 30 and December 1, 1979. The theme of this version was "Let's repeat the unbelievable." The symbolic girl was Valeria Arias.

It was performed at the Teatro Casino Las Vegas (as was the First Telethon). This time, the goal was to surpass the total in the previous Telethon, and that money would serve to continue building the Teletón's rehabilitation institutes in Santiago, Antofagasta, Valparaíso and Concepcion.

At 21:35 the target was passed with the total of: CL$ 85,427,324. Over the whole event a total of CL$138,728,450 was raised.

== Sponsors ==
Banco de Chile; Coca-Cola; Mantequilla Dos Álamos; Productos Maggi; Pilsener Cristal; Leche Soprole; Johnson's Clothes; Crema Dental Signal; Línea Blanca Fensa	Supermercados Unicoop; Vinos Santa Carolina; Aceite Cristal; Fideos Lucchetti; Farmacias Ahumada; Helados Bresler; Productos Schick; Postres Caricia; Tarjetas de Crédito Visa	Productores de Pollos; Zapatillas North Star; Cecinas La Preferida; Champagne Subercaseaux; Té Supremo; Maco Toyota; Productos de Tocador Kent

== Transmission ==
- 12.10.3.8 TVUN Red del Norte
- 4.5.8 Red UCV Televisión
- Televisión Nacional de Chile
- Teleonce (Universidad de Chile)
- Corporación de Televisión Universidad Católica de Chile
