= 2006 Chilean telethon =

Charity event

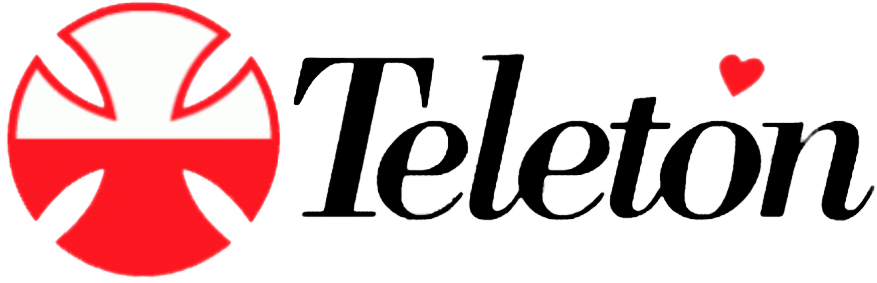
Chilean Telethon's logo

The 2006 Chilean telethon (Spanish: Teletón 2006) was the 20th version of the charity campaign held in Chile since 1978. The theme of this version was "With all my heart" (Con todo el corazón). The event was held during 1–2 December 2006. The poster girl chosen for the campaign was Kelly Rodriguez.

The event, broadcast over twenty seven consecutive hours, took place at the Telethon Theatre, with the closing of the campaign held in the National Stadium of Chile, where the final total was announced at 01:38 on Sunday, 3 December. The goal of CL$11,403,914,216 had been superseded by raising CL$11,804,425,008. On 15 December, Banco de Chile presented the final statement that included the auxiliary boxes unaccounted for during the telecast, which reached a record CL$14.110.203.362.

This version was made after two years without the Telethon event since during 2005 it postponed due to the presidential and parliamentary elections. This was the first Telethon to be held under the leadership of Michelle Bachelet.

== See also ==
- Telethon
