= 2007 Chilean telethon =

Charity event

Chilean Telethon's logo

The 2007 Chilean telethon was the 21st version of the charity campaign held in Chile since 1978. In this edition, which was conducted between November 30 and December 1, 2007, the slogan was "You are in every step" and the poster boy chosen to represent the children helped in the Telethon Foundation was Matías Calderón.

The opening night was marked by a tribute to the 50 years of Chilean television since 1957.

The event, broadcast for over twenty seven consecutive hours, was conducted primarily at the Teatro Teleton while the closure of the campaign took place in the National Stadium of Chile, where the last count was announced. The proposed target for this year was $ 11,804,425,008 (equivalent to U.S. $ 23,357,523)), which was achieved at 00:56 on Sunday 2 December. The event ended with a final tally of $13,255,231,970, slightly higher than U.S. $26 million.

The final statement, that included the auxiliary boxes unaccounted for during the telecast, was released by the directors of the Telethon and the Bank of Chile on December 12, 2007, a total of CL$16.929.371.138.
