= 1978 Chilean telethon =

Charity event

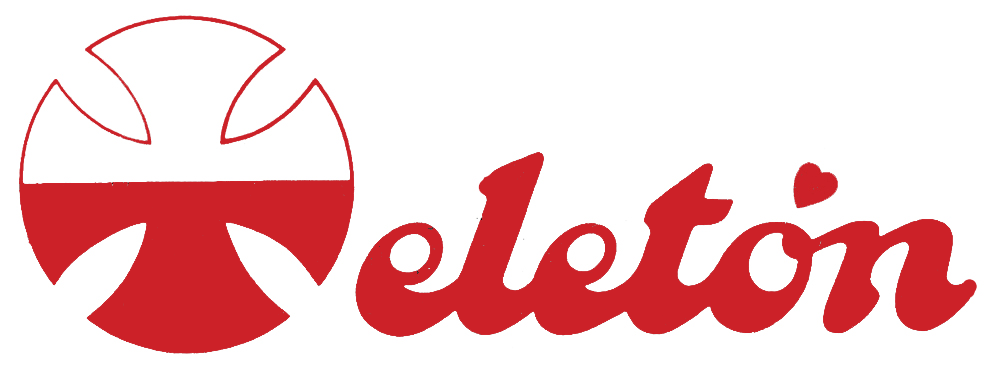
Logo of Teletón (Chilean telethon)

The 1978 Chilean telethon was the first version of the solidarity campaign held in Chile, which took place on December 8 and 9, 1978. The theme of this version was "Accomplish the miracle". The symbol girl for this first edition was Jane Hermosilla, although the strongest face of this campaign was the young Silvia Ceballos, who related how she overcame the effects of a serious car accident that left her in a wheelchair.

The idea for the project was thought up by Mario Kreutzberger, and in 1978, Don Francisco was able to unite all radio and television stations, in order to do a marathon show of 27 hours, linking all entertainers, journalists and artists. At the same time, Mario decided to seek sponsors to support this project.

The first telethon was intended to be aired on Friday December 1 and Saturday December 2, but scheduling problems of programming arose with Channel 13 and TVN transmitting the 1978 OTI Song Contest on that day, so the telethon was pushed back to the following weekend, December 8 and 9. The fundraising goal was $1,000,000 (33.79 million Chilean pesos), which, when achieved, would be used to create rehabilitation facilities for disabled children.

It took a while to reach the finish line but at dusk, in the final section, a total of 35,135,988 Chilean pesos was reached. With this the goal was exceeded, but later the figure doubled to 84,361,838 Chilean pesos. This event was the beginning of a series of yearly telethons in Chile, the next event being the 1979's telethon.
