= 2011 Chilean telethon =

Charity event

Logo of Teletón (Chilean telethon)

The 2011 Chilean telethon (Spanish: Teletón 2011) was the 24th version of this solidarity event in Chile, to raise funds for the rehabilitation of children with motor disabilities. The event, which was aired over 27 consecutive hours through the Chilean television channels grouped in the National Television Association (Anatel), was held from Teletón Theatre on December 2 and December 3 and from the National Stadium in its final stage. The poster child was Isidora Guzmán (aged 6 on 2011), who has cerebral palsy.

After almost 28 hours of uninterrupted transmission, the amount collected during the day of solidarity was CL$21,735,065,277 (USD42,308,343), exceeding the original goal by 15.06%. On 21 December, the Fundación Teletón's Directorate gave the final figure achieved in this campaign, reaching a total of CL$28,457,298,750 (USD55,393,492), 50.64% above the goal set.
