= Carolina de Moras =

Chilean TV host

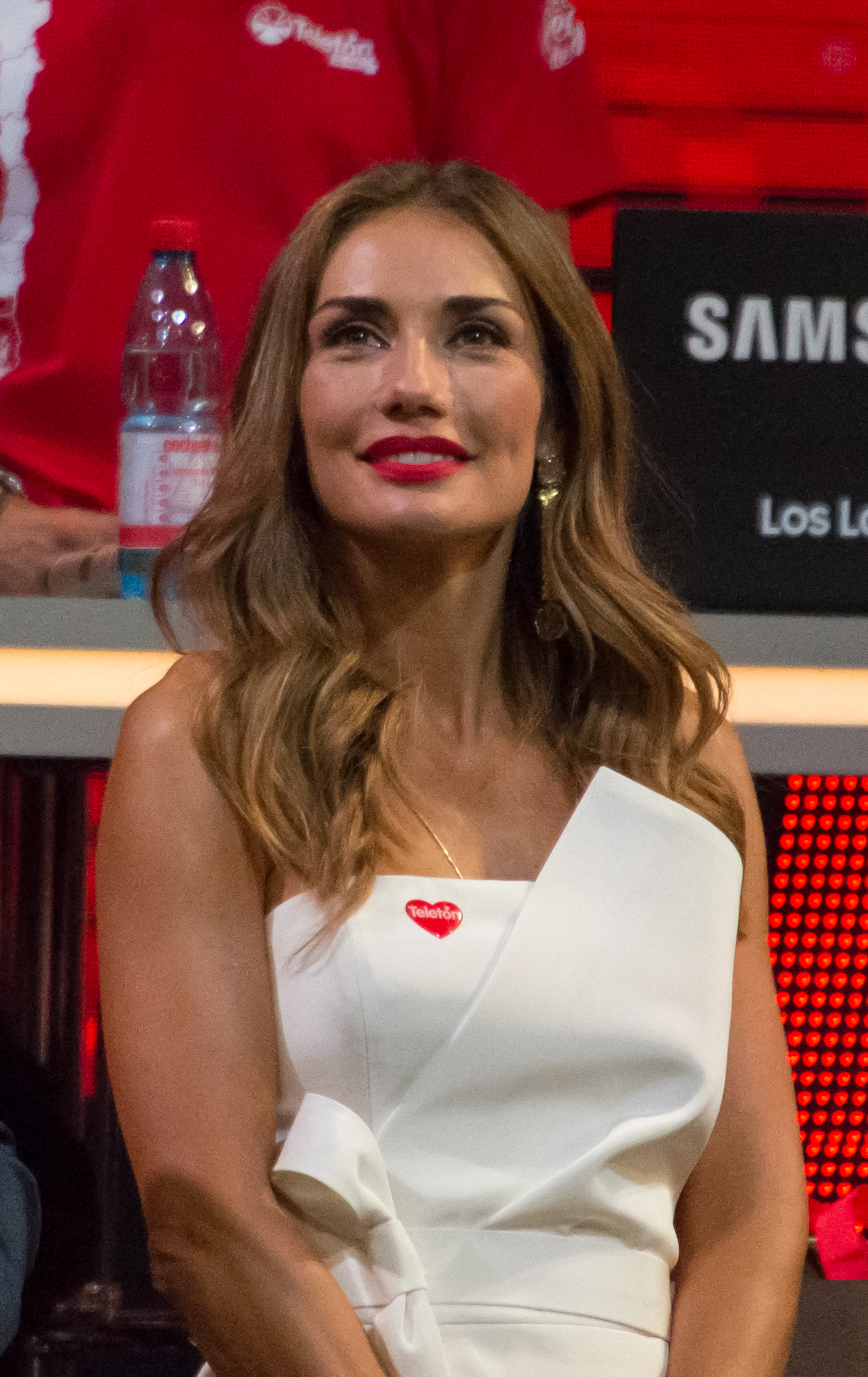
- Born: Carolina Andrea de Moras Alvarado; 24 February 1981 (age 45); Osorno, Chile
- Height: 5 ft 10 in (1.78 m)
- Beauty pageant titleholder
- Hair color: Brown
- Eye color: Green

Carolina Andrea de Moras Alvarado (born 24 February 1981 in Osorno) is a Chilean model, actress and television presenter of French origin.

== Cinema ==
Year	Film	Role	Director
2010	Fuck My Life	María del Pilar Lyon	Nicolás López

== Television ==
=== TV shows ===
Year	Title	Role	Channel
2007	Chocolate	Fashion commentator	Canal 13
2009	Viva la mañana	Fashion commentator	Canal 13
2010–2011	Buenos días a todos	Presenter	TVN
2013	Live from the Red Carpet: 2013 Viña del Mar Festival	Fashion commentator	Chilevisión
2013	Fiebre de Viña	Presenter (with Cristián Sánchez and Américo)	Chilevisión
2013	¡Salta si puedes!	Co-presenter (with Rafael Araneda)	Chilevisión
Since 2013	Talento chileno	Jury	Chilevisión
2014	2014 Viña del Mar International Song Festival	Presenter (with Rafael Araneda)	Chilevision
2015	Pequeños Gigantes (Chile)	Presenter	Chilevision
2015	2015 Viña del Mar International Song Festival	Presenter (with Rafael Araneda)	Chilevision
Since 2015	La mañana de Chilevisión	Presenter (with Ignacio Gutiérrez)	Chilevision

=== Series and unitary ===
Year	Title	Role	Channel
2008	Transantiaguinos	Andrea Valdivieso	Canal 13

=== Specials ===
Year	Title	Role	Channel
2010	2010 Chilean telethon	Presenter	ANATEL
2011	2011 Chilean telethon	Presenter	ANATEL

Awards and achievements
Preceded by Eva Gómez and Rafael Araneda	Viña del Mar International Song Festival presenters (with Rafael Araneda); 2014	Succeeded by TBD
