= Helvecia Viera =

Helvecia Viera (1928 – March 29, 2009) was a Chilean actress and comedian. Viera appeared in Chilean television and theater productions throughout her career, which spanned over three decades. Viera died following a series of strokes at the Hospital Sótero del Río in Santiago, Chile, on March 29, 2009, at the age of 80.

== Television credits ==
Her television credits included Morandé con compañía and Sábados Gigantes. Her other notable roles include Versus (2005), Don Floro (2004) and Jappening con Ja (1978).
