= Chupi =

Chupi چوپي
- Village
- Location within Iran
- Coordinates: 35°50′24″N 47°43′20″E
- Country: Iran
- Province: Kurdistan
- County: Bijar
- Bakhsh: Central
- Rural District: Khvor Khvoreh

Population (2006)
  - Total: 68
- Time zone: UTC+3:30 (IRST)
  - Summer (DST): UTC+4:30 (IRDT)

Chupi (Persian: چوپي, also Romanized as Chūpī; also known as Chūbī) is a village in Khvor Khvoreh Rural District, in the Central District of Bijar County, Kurdistan Province, Iran. At the 2006 census, its population was 68, in 23 families. The village is populated by Kurds.
