= VTR (telecom company) =

Chilean telecommunications company

Coordinates: 33°23′39″S 70°37′06″W

VTR Comunicaciones SpA
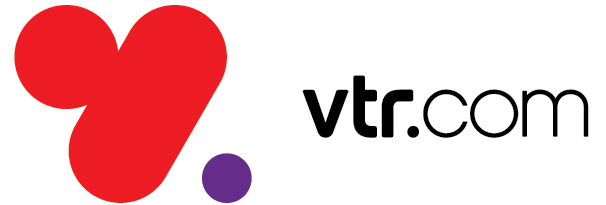
- Type: Subsidiary of Liberty Latin America
- Industry: Telecommunications
- Predecessor: Vía Trans Radio Chilena
- Founded: September 26, 1928; 97 years ago
- Headquarters: Av. Apoquindo Nº4800, Las Condes, Santiago, Chile
- Area served: All regions of Chile
- Key people: Alfredo Parot Donoso (CEO)
- Products: Internet; Cable television Telephony mobile telephony
- Parent: Liberty Latin America
- Website: vtr.com

VTR (Vía Trans Radio Comunicaciones SpA) is a Chilean telecommunications company. It is the country's largest provider of subscription television, with 1,065,675 subscribers (32.8% market share, as of September 2017), and of fixed broadband Internet access (38.0% share, as of September 2017). It is also the second largest provider of fixed telephone service (20.0%, as of September 2017), behind Telefónica. It also has a small but growing market share (0.90%, as of September 2017) in the mobile phone business.

== History ==
The company was founded in 1928 as Vía Trans Radio Chilena Compañía de Radiotelegrafía, as a joint investment in the country made by Radio Corporation of America, the Marconi Wireless Telegraph Company, the Compagnie générale de la télégraphie sans fil (after 1968 Thomson-CSF) and Telefunken. Vía Trans Radio Chilena started off as a provider of domestic and international radiotelegraphy and later a provider of telex services. In the 1980s, VTR started to offer automatic direct dialling, fax and data transmission. In 1986, Thomson-CSF sold its 25% stake in VTR to Antofagasta plc, part of the Grupo Luksic conglomerate. In 1993, VTR launched its pay-television and mobile telephony services with the launch of Telecable Sur SA (cable television), its acquisition of Maxivisión (MMDS wireless cable) and the launch with Compañía de Teléfonos de Chile (CTC) of the mobile network Startel.

Since 2014, VTR is wholly owned by Liberty Latin America following the split of Liberty Latin America from Liberty Global effective December 29, 2017; Grupo Saieh's CorpGroup previously owned 20% until March 2014 when Liberty Global acquired the remaining 20% it did not own.

VTR also owned Bazuca.com, a now-defunct video rental services company, and —together with Turner Broadcasting System— CNN Chile, a 24-hour news channel based in Santiago, until 2016, when it was bought entirely by WarnerMedia Latin America.

== Merger ==
After a massive post-pandemic customer flight due to several high-profile outages, at the end of September 2021, VTR announced the establishment of a joint-venture with Claro Chile in a joint statement from Liberty Latin América and América Móvil, parent companies of both companies; The new joint company was called ClaroVTR. In October 2022, the Fiscalía Nacional Económica (National Economic Prosecutor's Office) authorized the merger, but demanding the sale of the satellite television business operated by Claro, given the historical prohibition of the same FNE that has prevented VTR since 2004 offer such services.
