= Compañía de las Cervecerías Unidas =

Chilean producer of diversified beverages

Compañía Cervecerías Unidas S.A.
- Type: Sociedad Anónima
- Traded as: BCS: CCU; NYSE: CCU
- Industry: Beverages & foods
- Founded: 1902
- Headquarters: Santiago,
- Key people: Andrónico Luksic Craig, (Chairman); Patricio Jottar, (CEO)
- Products: Beer wine soft drinks cider pisco spirits foods
- Revenue: ▲US$2.2 billion (2017)
- Net income: ▼US$232.5 million (2017)
- Number of employees: 8,000
- Website: www.ccu.cl

Compañía Cervecerías Unidas S.A. (commonly abbreviated to CCU) is a Chilean producer of diversified beverages founded in 1902. The company produces both alcoholic and non-alcoholic beverages, also operating in the food sector. They have operations in Chile, Argentina, Bolivia, Colombia, Paraguay, Uruguay and Peru.

CCU is notably far from obscurity in South America and is somewhat diverse. It is Chile's largest brewer, the second largest soft drink producer, the second largest wine producer, the largest bottler of mineral water and fruit-based beverages in Chile, one of the largest pisco producers in the region, and it participates in the candy manufacturing business. CCU is the second-largest brewer in Argentina and also participates in the cider, spirits and wine industries. In Uruguay and Paraguay, the Company is present in the beer, mineral and bottled water, soft drinks and fruit-based beverage categories. In Bolivia, CCU participates in the beer, water, soft drinks and malt beverage categories. In Colombia, the Company participates in the beer industry and in Peru, in the pisco industry.

The CCU product portfolio includes its own brands, as well as licensed and imported brands, maintaining licensing agreements and / or joint ventures with Heineken International N.V., Anheuser-Busch Inc. (now a wholly owned subsidiary of Anheuser-Busch InBev N.V.), PepsiCo Inc., Paulaner Brewery GmbH & Co. KG, (Brau Holding International GmbH & Co. KGaA), Keurig Dr Pepper Inc. (formerly Cadbury Schweppes and Dr Pepper Snapple Group Inc.), Guinness Brewery (a subsidiary of Diageo Plc), and Societe des Produits Nestlé S.A..

In 1957, the first digital computer arrived in Chile after the CCU purchased a Univac to be delivered to Valparaíso. The machine was one of the first documented cases in the history of computer science in South America.

In December 2003, the company commissioned a series of commercials for Cerveza Cristal, which were broadcast at the beginning of each advertising period during the broadcast of films from the Star Wars saga on Canal 13, so that the spots seemed to be continuations of the preceding scenes. The campaign, titled The Force is with Cristal Beer, was awarded at various international events.
