= TV+ (Chile) =

Chilean television channel

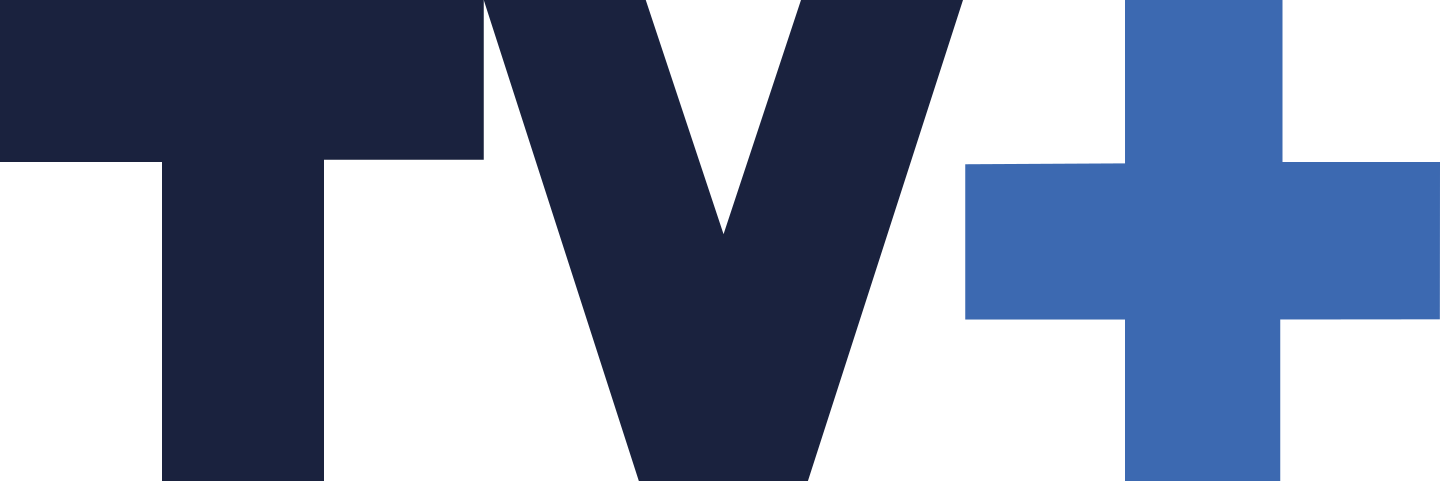
- Country: Chile
- Broadcast area: National
- Headquarters: Vitacura, Santiago, Chile

Programming
- Picture format: 1080i HDTV (downscaled to 480i for the SD feed)

Ownership
- Owner: Media 23 SpA (90%); PUCV (10%)

History
- Launched: October 5, 1957
- Former names: UCV Televisión (1957–2018)

Links
- Website: www.tvmas.tv

Availability

Terrestrial
- Digital UHF: Listings may vary

TV+ (pronounced Te Ve Más or TV Más) is a Chilean free-to-air television channel. which is broadcast from Santiago. Previously known as the Television Corporation of the Pontifical Catholic University of Valparaíso or UCV Televisión, it was the oldest television station in the country and the only regional network outside of Santiago that had nationwide coverage. It started broadcasting on an experimental (but public) level in the Pontifical University of Valparaíso's buildings in 1957 and was officially launched in August 1959. In 2017, it moved its offices to the Agua Santa district in Viña del Mar.

On 21 November 2018 at 5:00pm, the channel was rebranded as "TV+" and premiered a new graphical package. In late-November, the digital-terrestrial-television subchannel UCV 3 (controlled by the PUCV) would be rebranded as UCV Televisión, broadcasting from its original studios in Viña del Mar.

In recent years, the television station's audience share started to plummet. In 2016, the Pontifical Catholic University of Valparaíso started to search a business partner to revamp the network. On 29 December, the university announced that it sold the channel to the TV enterprise «TV+ SpA», composed of PUCV Multimedios SpA, a media company owned by the university with 10% of the network's share, and Media 23 SpA — a joint venture between GCO Entretención, Disney's official licensed commercial partner in the country, and Contempora, owned by Jesús Diez González, a Chilean businessman owner of the "TurBus" transportation business and manager of the agricultural distributor Covepal— which holds the remaining 90% of the station's share.

== History ==
On 5 October 1957, the first regular television broadcast in Chile was outcarried by a group of researchers from the Electronics Faculty of the Pontifical Catholic University of Valparaíso. The broadcast event was the inauguration of a new campus dedicated to laboratories and classrooms. The event was attended by the then-President of Chile, Carlos Ibáñez del Campo, government ministers and other authorities of the State during his administration.

This event was considered to be the first true scheduled television broadcast as the television network also aired a newscast following the event. The TV station was officially launched on 22 August 1959 on VHF channel 8 of Valparaíso. Its first aired television show was El hombre ante el universo (The man in the face of the universe), a cultural programme. From 1957 to 1960, UCV TV used to broadcast from 4:00pm to 10:00pm local time. However, from 1968 to 1970, the station increased its airtime, ranging from 3:00pm to 12:00am midnight. In 1969, the network moved its frequency to VHF channel 4 of Valparaíso.

In 1971, UCV TV built a relay transmitter in La Serena, which was the first city outside the Valparaíso Region that could receive UCV TV. Three years later, in 1974, the network built another relay transmitter in the capital, Santiago. In 1975, UCV purchased portable camcorders that made it easier for the network to record footage in the streets as most television stations at the time were still using cinema-centred camera equipment - it beat the competition in the process. In 1978, UCV TV started colour broadcasts along with Santiago's channel 13, the Television Corporation of the Catholic University of Chile (UCTV for short) and could adapt itself to these new changes in just three months. In that same year, it broadcast the first Teletón event as the "Red UCV Televisión", that could be identified by the channel numbers 4, 5 and 8, which represented the frequencies in which the network was broadcasting in Valparaíso, Santiago and La Serena, respectively. The affiliate in La Serena, known as "Canal 8 UCV Televisión", not only aired UCV TV programmes, but also imported programming from Santiago's channel 13.

An affiliate started in Puerto Montt in 1990, initially on channel 7 before moving to channel 8 in 1998, by then it became a relay broadcaster. That same year, to give way to La Red, UCV switched frequencies to Channel 5.

== High-definition feed ==
The channel launched its own HD feed on 25 June 2010, back when it was still named UCV Televisión (the feed was distributed as UCV TV HD) with the broadcast of the football match between Chile and Spain during the 2010 FIFA World Cup in South Africa, in association with TVN. It was launched on the digital terrestrial television platform on virtual channel 29.1 in Greater Valparaíso and virtual channel 5.1 in Greater Santiago. It broadcasts at 1920x1080 interlaced lines at 60 fields per second.
