= Soprole =

Chilean dairy company

- Company type: Subsidiary
- Industry: Food processing
- Founded: 1949; 77 years ago
- Headquarters: Santiago, Chile
- Area served: Chile
- Products: Dairy products
- Parent: Grupo Gloria
- Website: www.soprole.cl

Soprole or Sociedad Productores de Leche is a Chilean maker of dairy products. Under the Soprole brand, the company markets yogurt, milk, desserts, Jelly and butter. It was part of Fonterra until 2022, since March 2023, it is a subsidiary of Grupo Gloria.

== History ==
Soprole was created in 1948, initially as a milk, cheese and butter producer. In the 1970s, it diversified its production into more value-added products like juices, pastries and yogurt. Juan Luis Undurraga Aninat, one of the founders, acquired the shares of other investors allowing him to control more than 40 percent of the company. In 1986, the New Zealand Dairy Board, now part of Fonterra, acquired more than 50 percent of Soprole's shares, giving it majority control. That same year, Juan Luis Undurraga Aninat transferred his shares of the company to create the Fundación Isabel Aninat. Under the control of the New Zealand Dairy Board, Soprole bought out some of its competitors like Lácteos Pirque in 1994 and Dos Álamos in 1997. Today, 76 percent of the Chilean dairy market is controlled by four companies: Nestlé, Soprole, Loncoleche and Colún.

In November 2022, the Grupo Gloria Inc, a Peruvian corporation of foods, buys Soprole's supply in its entirety for USD 210 million. On March 30, 2023, after approval by the Chilean authorities, the company Gloria Foods (subsidiary of Grupo Gloria S.A) takes full control of Soprole.
