= Banco de Chile =

Chilean bank

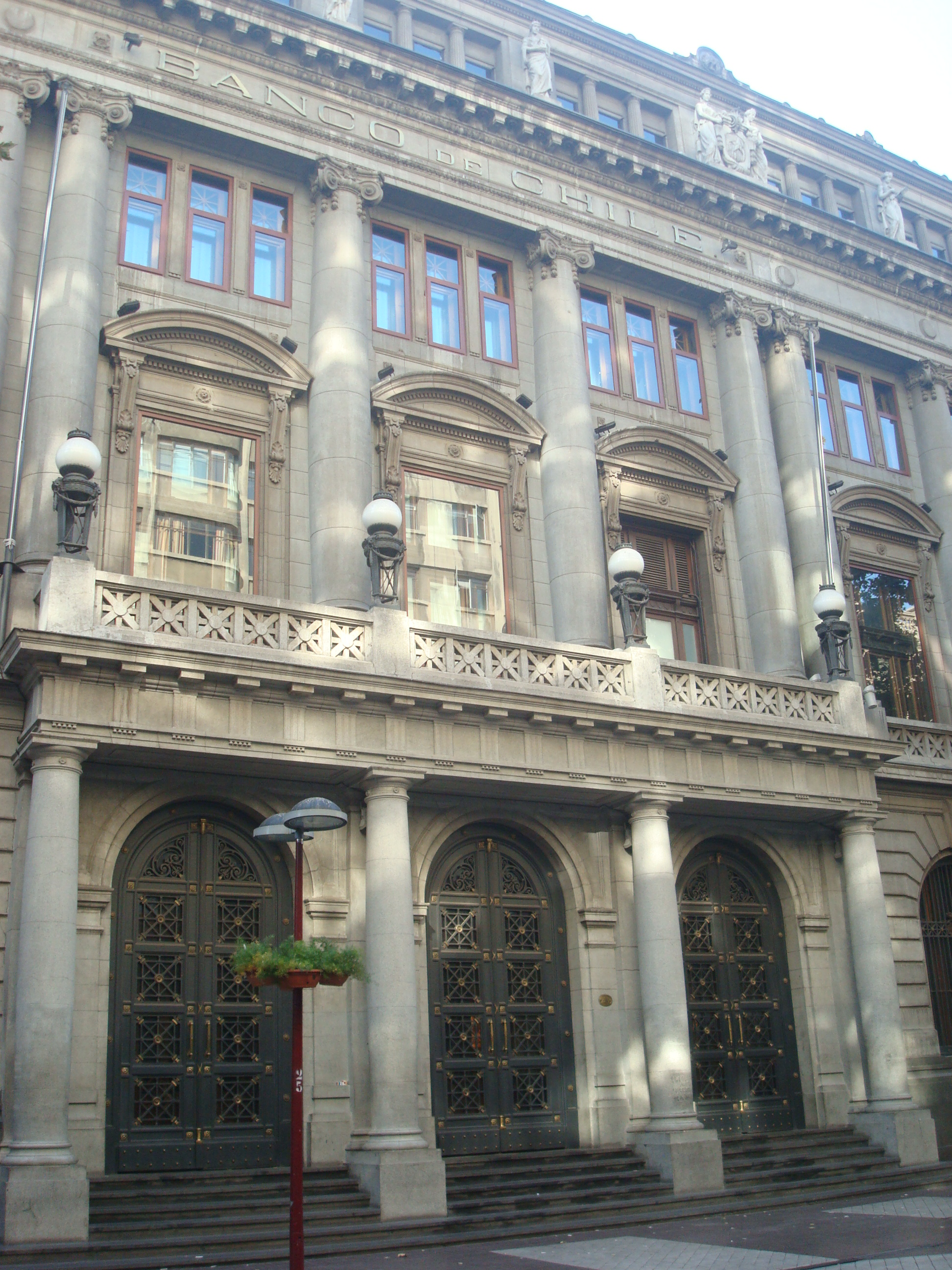
- Company type: Sociedad Anónima
- Traded as: BCS: CHILE; NYSE: BCH; BMAD: XBCH
- Industry: Banking
- Founded: October 1893
- Headquarters: Santiago, Chile
- Key people: Pablo Granifo Lavín (Chairman); Arturo Tagle Quiroz (CEO); Andrónico Luksic Craig (Vice President); Francisco Aristeguieta Silva (Vice President)
- Revenue: ▲US$ 3.8 billion (2017)
- Net income: ▲US$ 888.4 million (2017)
- Total assets: ▲US$ 55.0 billion (2018)
- Owner: Quiñenco (29%); Citigroup (29%)
- Number of employees: 14,581
- Subsidiaries: SM-Chile
- Website: bancochile.cl

Banco de Chile (English: Bank of Chile) is a Chilean bank and financial services company with headquarters in the city of Santiago de Chile. It's a commercial bank that provides a range of financial services to clients. As of December 31, 2012, Banco de Chile has a national network of 434 branches, 1,915 ATMs and other electronic channels of distribution.

Since 2008, it has been jointly controlled by the Chilean conglomerate Quiñenco group and US bank Citigroup.

Operations are organized around six main commercial divisions: large corporations, SMEs, private clients, consumer finance, international banking and capital markets. Additionally, subsidiaries offer securitization, securities brokerage, mutual investment and bottomry, insurance and factoring, among others. Outside Chile, the bank has had a branch in New York City for more than 20 years and has branches in Miami, São Paulo, Buenos Aires, Mexico City and Hong Kong providing international services.

== History ==
Founded on 28 October 1893 by the merger of the Valparaíso Bank (1855), National Bank of Chile (1865) and Agriculturist Bank (1869). Banco de Chile has traditionally led the Chilean financial market as one of the largest banks in terms of turnover and deposits.

In 2001, the Chile conglomerate Quiñenco group bought 59.3% share of the company through the subsidiary company LQIF and took control of the bank.

In 2008, Citigroup agreed with Quiñenco to take a 32.96% stake in LQIF and merged Citigroup Chile operations with Banco de Chile.

In April 2010, Citigroup exercised its two outstanding options and increased its share in LQIF to 50%.

On December 9, 2004, Banco de Chile became the first Chilean financial institution to operate in the Asian markets, after closing a co-operation agreement with Standard Chartered Bank.

== Controversies ==
=== US money laundering ===
In 2005, the US Office of the Comptroller of the Currency (OCC) removed the General Manager of Banco de Chile - New York from the United States banking industry and imposed a $200,000 civil money penalty against the individual for engaging in unsafe banking practices, related to his involvement in accounts owned or controlled by the prominent politically exposed person and his associates. In addition, Banco de Chile-New York and Banco de Chile-Miami failed to timely respond to widely publicized reports of alleged criminal activity by this high-profile Chilean politically exposed person (PEP) and failed to gather and analyze information from applicable accounts in order to assess the potential for suspicious activity. The OCC issued a Cease and desist against Banco de Chile for Bank Secrecy Act violations. The US Financial Crimes Enforcement Network also levied a $3 million penalty on Banco de Chile for not identifying, monitoring and reporting suspicious activity related to a Chilean politically exposed person, his family and associates doing business in its New York and Miami branches. The high-profile Chilean PEP was confirmed to be Augusto Pinochet, the retired former dictator of the country who came to power in a military coup.

=== Pinochet funds ===
In 2009, Banco de Chile was one of four banks sued by the Chilean government for negligently or deliberately helping former dictator Augusto Pinochet hide $26 million in stolen funds. The other banks were PNC Financial Services Group Inc., Banco Santander, Espirito Santo Bank. "The Chilean government may have chosen to go after the four banks specifically because the documented evidence of negligence or willful blindness was stronger," said Michael Díaz, managing partner with law firm Díaz Reus & Targ LLP in Miami, adding that the other institutions may be "on the periphery of liability."

== Divisions ==
The divisions of the Bank of Chile Group are:

- BanChile Corredores de Bolsa
- Banco CrediChile
- Banco Edwards - Citi
- BanChile Seguros

== See also ==
- Money laundering
