= Poster child =

Person who represents a cause or ideal

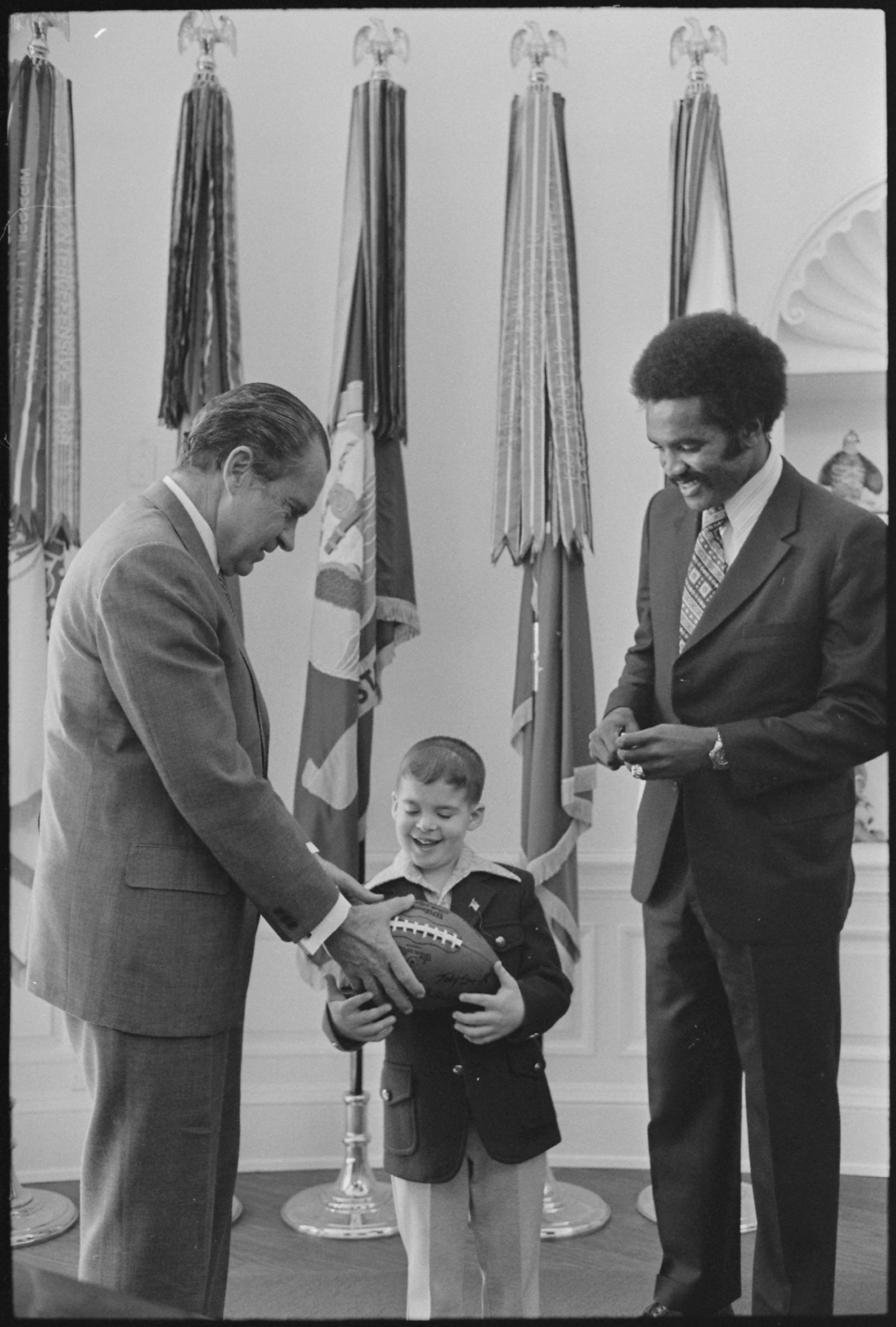
Richard Nixon, Kevin Heald, 1972 Poster Child of the Arc of the United States

A poster child (sometimes poster boy or poster girl) is, according to the original meaning of the term, a child who had some disease or deformity whose picture is used on posters or other media as part of a campaign to raise money or enlist volunteers for a cause or organization. Such campaigns may be part of an annual effort or event, and may include the name and age of a specific child along with other personally identifiable attributes.

"Poster child" has become a metaphor for a person of any age whose attributes or behavior are emblematic of a known cause, movement, circumstance or ideal. The person in question is thought of as an embodiment or archetype. This signifies that the subject's identity is synonymous with or at least representative of the associated ideal in its most favorable or least favorable aspects.

== Examples ==
- Bobbi Campbell was a self-professed "AIDS poster boy" in the earliest years of the epidemic.
- Emily Susan Rapp was a poster child for the March of Dimes in the US, following the amputation of her leg at age four, due to a congenital birth defect.
- Aziz Shavershian was described as the poster boy of a subculture of amateur bodybuilding in Australia, dubbed "aesthetics", and gained a large cult following of admirers.
- Ryan White was considered a poster child for social acceptance of people with AIDS, after he contracted the disease from a blood transfusion and was expelled from his school.

== See also ==
- Archetype
- Epitome
- Mascot
