= El monstruo (audience) =

Chilean festival audience

"El Monstruo" (English: "The Monster") is the popular designation given in Chile to the audience attending Viña del Mar International Song Festival. The name is due to the great authority of the audience in each day of the event. From pressing to lengthen presentations favorite artists to interruptions with catcalls to singers and comedians who are not talented or funny, booing to prevent them to complete their show and force them to step off from the stage. In that case, in Chile it is said that "El Monstruo ate the artist".

The audience at Viña del Mar International Song Festival is the only one in the world that has received a special name. This creates an expectation in people attending the show, waiting for the slightest opportunity to show their intolerance. Most artists booed by El Monstruo have been comedians, both for being unfunny or by the misfortune to get on the stage right between performances of singers or bands of renown.

Sometimes, however, the public has manifested catcalls to protest the presenters of the event. This happened in the 2007 edition, when the hosts, Tonka Tomicic and Sergio Lagos, dismissed the artist Ana Torroja to the crowd surprise, it wanted her to keep singing. The spectators booing to Lagos and Tomicic lasted nearly an hour. The same happened in 2009 when El Monstruo was in favor of Simply Red, booing for an hour for the group to return, and incidentally interrupting the Folk Competition, the singer Paolo Meneguzzi, a humorous routine performed by the trio Manpoval until they partially calmed their minds with the presentation of Rakim and Ken-Y.

A memorable occasion happened when El Monstruo asked the Gaviota de Plata for José Luis Rodríguez in 1988; the refusal of the mayor of Viña del Mar, Eugenia Garrido, who in the 1980s was who corroborated the awards, the singer said: "Sometimes the people's voice must be heard!", a phrase which some thought that had a political background in relation to the military regime that was ruling the country; the artist has said that his sentence was not thought out or had a direct political intention.

The most recent manifestation of this phenomenon was in the edition of 2017, during the presentation of the Chilean singer Mon Laferte, who was nicknamed "the woman who woke El Monstruo". She achieved one of the greatest ovations of Quinta Vergara for a Chilean artist living in another country, as well as causing chaos and booing towards the animators and the organization of the event, due to the denial of these to award her the Gaviota de Platino. This award recognizes the career of great artists; and only had been granted to the Mexican singer Luis Miguel in 2012 and to the Spanish singer Isabel Pantoja in the same version of the contest. Given the situation, the host of the festival Carolina de Moras commented in an interview: "She took a much bigger prize, she took the real ovation of La Quinta Vergara and the Platino can not pay that". The general director of the show, Alex Hernández, also commented, "At that moment I felt that El Monstruo was something wonderful, I found a wonderful television moment in which it was happening". Hernandez also explained the reason why it was decided not to deliver a second Gaviota de Oro to the artist to replace the Gaviota de Platino: "We did not deliver it simply because we did not wanted to set a precedent that later could cost us double Gaviotas with many artists".

== Explanation of the phenomenon ==
The possible reason for the existence of El Monstruo is over-dimensioned quality public festival to voice their catcalls heavily and for a long time. This is because the place and time of its completion, the Quinta Vergara Amphitheater (located on top of a small hill) and at night, provides a level of noise from the stands to the very large stage, even the whistling of a single person can be heard.

In addition, the gallery is very high in relation to the orchestra, which makes the audience look like a huge mountain of people from stage, simulating to be a semi-coliseum capable of holding 15,000 people in it.

== List of ousted artists ==
Some of the artists that the public of Viña del Mar International Song Festival has prevented from completing their stage show, but there are others that have been split by El Monstruo, that is, some people were booing and other cheering, and others amazingly have managed to silence them.

Version			Artist/Group	Show	Explanation
1968	IX	(Chile)	Gloria Simonetti	Singer	It was catcalling in its two presentations on stage, what she said was due to a campaign against him by the daughter of a businessman. The following year win the festival with the song "Mira mira".
1972	XIII	(South Africa)	Miriam Makeba	Singer	The South African, who was also an activist against racism was booed for several minutes. Finally, singing her famous song "Pata-Pata" managed to quell public blunders.
1977	XVIII	(Chile)	Los Muleros	Humorists	After a successful presentation in the year 1976, this group was presented with a brand new show, which was not to the taste of the public, which demanded the old songs.
1977	XVIII	(Uruguay)	Juan Verdaguer	Humorist	Its elegant jokes failed to captivate the people of the Quinta, causing their quick exit from the stage in one of his two presentations.
1980	XXI	(Brazil)	José Vasconcelos	Humorist	Brazilian bored the audience with jokes known until the catcalls would not let him continue.
1984	XXV	(Chile)	Ronco Retes	Humorist	After preparing a show in a couple of days, Ronco Retes took the stage with a routine that almost no one laughed at, which failed to last more than a few minutes.
1984	XXV	(Chile)	Checho Hirane	Humorist	After failing to tame the public, he believed that jumping into a trampoline could make him laugh. By now, the catcalls grew and his show ended abruptly.
1985	XXVI	(Spain)	Miguel Gallardo	Singer	In his first presentation it was catcalled up from the beginning by the public, so it could not go beyond a few minutes.
1985	XXVI	(Spain)	Dyango	Singer	Despite having had a successful run last year, its own fans at what catcalling on 1985.
1985	XXVI	(Cuba) (Venezuela)	María Conchita Alonso	Singer	The jury and Queen of the Festival received the hostility of the people, which hardly left her perform her songs.
1990	XXXI	(Chile)	Sergio Feito and son	Humorists	Feito and his son Mario suffered one of the worst catcalls in the history of the festival. Because of poor, poorly structured routine with vintage jokes for the time, the boos were so strong that the environmental microphones (placed among the audience) had to be turned off; the catcalls heard on television were audible through the microphones of artists and the orchestra.
1992	XXXIII	(Chile)	Lucho Gatica	Singer	
1992	XXXIII	(Chile)	Florcita Motuda	Singer	The artist had acted in Competition 1987 wearing a presidential sash, which was interpreted at the time as a veiled protest against the military regime, which it was later recalled by the audience.
1993	XXXIV	(Chile)	Marcos "Charola" Pizarro	Humorist	
1993	XXXIV	(Argentina)	Luis Pescetti	Humorist	With a child and loosely structured routine, Pecetti bored the audience, which dropped him from the stage with his own game, lasting only seven minutes of presentation
1993	XXXIV	(Chile)	Piña Colada	Humorist	
1993	XXXIV	(French Polynesia)	Vaitiare	Singer	
1994	XXXV	(Mexico)	Onda Vaselina	Musical Band	The youth group was not known in Chile and had been brought to the festival only by agreement of Megavisión with Televisa to make Mexican artists. That caused them to be catcalled in his presentation.
1997	XXXVIII	(Chile)	Jorge Pérez	Humorist	Unknown to the public and the media, and the result predicted by the press was a strong booing from the audience, which was fulfilled to get this with a routine shown one month before in the Festival del Huaso de Olmué.
1998	XXXIX	(Chile)	Óscar Gangas	Humorist	He won the contempt for El Monstruo then began their routine making a critique of humor with double meaning, being that in an earlier day of the Festival of that year, the duo Melón y Melame won a Gaviota de Plata with that style routines, and when he did, too, at one of his jokes, a comparison with the prototype of Argentinean and Chilean people, thereby obtaining further catcalls in his ailing presentation.
1998	XXXIX	(Spain)	Sarah Sanders	Humorist	The Spanish failed to position themselves quickly with her show and after 7 minutes had to get off the stage.
2000	XLI	(Brazil)	Xuxa	Singer	Brazilian singer suffered an embarrassment, when the audience responded with an obscenity to the chorus of her song "Ilarié". Xuxa did not understand for several minutes and thought it was a game from El Monstruo. Finally when told who word the audience chanted, she entered into tears and went to her daughter on stage; the public took pity and gave the Gaviota de Plata.
2000	XLI	(Spain)	Enrique Iglesias	Singer	He earned the hatred of El Monstruo course, when was given the Gaviota de Plata, he launched it to the public as a sign, as he said, from gratitude. However, the gesture was not interpreted that way by the audience, and perceived as an insult and disrespect, so the last songs he had prepared for his repertoire were boos, until the end of his show.
2001	XLII	(Chile)	Daniel Muñoz	Comedian	His routine with the character El Carmelo failed to make the audience laugh as when in 2000 acted as El Malo.
2003	XLIV	(Chile)	Vanessa Miller	Comedian	The character La Nana Argentina was never liked by the audience, which responded negatively to any question Miller about their routine, despite the help the animator, Antonio Vodanovic, had given him.
2004	XLV	(Chile)	Natalia Cuevas	Comedian	Despite previously carried on the same stage, in 2004 was booed.
2005	XLVI	(Mexico)	Fey	Singer	Although it was not entirely booed, the audience would not let her finish her presentation because before she, was presented with great success his compatriot Marco Antonio Solis, whom El Monstruo wanted back.
2006	XLVII	(Mexico)	Los Tigres del Norte	Musical Band	They were booed because much of the audience demanded that the previous band (A-ha) continue the show. This caused trouble to the other side of the public who did want to hear, which caused protest in the same way.
2008	XLIX	(Chile)	Professor Salomón y Tutu-Tutu	Humorists	The routine of the characters failed to captivate El Monstruo.
2009	L	(Italy)	Paolo Meneguzzi	Singer	It was catcalled up by El Monstruo because this required to the Simply Red band, lived a confusing and difficult situation to handle for animators, who watched part of the public to catcall and another part to scream for the singer.
2009	L	(Chile)	Manpoval	Humorists	Although they were not strongly catcalled, retired from the stage early because the public was demanded the return of Simply Red, in addition to the old jokes used in their routine (very similar to what they had done in the Festival del Huaso de Olmué a month before).
2010	LI	(Mexico)	Anahí	Singer	The Chilean public not only criticized the ex RBD to sing with playback, but booed and did not let her finish her show, in addition to being accused of wanting to emulate with little success the singer Lady Gaga.
2011	LII	(Chile)	Ricardo Meruane	Humorist	Catcalled because the public wanted Sting to return to the stage. After some mistakes in the beginning, even alluding Sting and the public of the festival, as well as an ineffective routine, the comedian was booed. His act lasted only 19 minutes. His performance in the Festival by the following sentence is remembered: Gracias, gracias, no se molesten (English: "Thank you very much, do not bother"), that he repeated several times in his short minutes.
2013	LIV	(Chile)	Jorge González	Singer	The public was divided against when he alluded to big businessmen, such as Horst Paulmann, Andronico Luksic, the owners of Time Warner (owners from Chilevisión, organizer channel), calling them scoundrels and even to politicians like Michelle Bachelet and Sebastián Piñera, which made that part of the audience strongly catcalled him and other ovationed him in the same way, but to sing one of the songs of his ex group Los Prisioneros got that the side booed him to shut up and chanted their songs, to finish his show smoothly.
2014	LV	(Chile)	Ruddy Rey	Humorist	It was catcalled up by the public because this would keep listening to Ana Gabriel, so early in his routine received the boo. Also, his mood through music don't managed the impact he expected.
2015	LVI	(Chile)	Arturo Ruiz-Tagle	Humorist	It was catcalled up by the public when he start his presentation, not just for doing their boy character named Arturito, but it also because much of the audience wanted to return to the songwriter Yusuf Cat Stevens, but after leaving his character and make his routine classic style, he managed to silence the boos and provoke laughter in the audience.
2016	LVII	(Chile)	Pedro Ruminot	Humorist	During his routine, a part of the public began to catcall to a joke related to epileptics and the Catholic religion, forcing him to change the course of his routine. Although he received the Gaviota de Plata, Ruminot was carried away by nerves and continued an accelerated presentation without a logical story, which bored the Monster, who booed him tightly until he left the stage.
2016	LVII	(Chile)	Ricardo Meruane	Humorist	While he had a good start routine, the catcalls of the public who remembered his poor performance in the 2011 he played a trick and caused nervousness, so his show began to decline, forcing him to leave the stage. The TV hosts tried to give a new opportunity to Meruane, highlighting the courage of comedian for continue their routine to adversity, which was applauded by El Monstruo; however, although he ended up accepting the challenge, the humorist finished boring the audience, forcing him to leave the stage after 45 minutes presentation. He is also remembered by his phrase: ¡Apaga la luz, loco! (English: Turn off the light, loony!) while he was being booed.
2016	LVII	(Chile)	Javiera Mena	Singer	The Chilean artist who also officiated jury, was booed by a part of the public during certain times in her presentation, because of their participation days ago during the show of Spanish singer Alejandro Sanz. Mena was invited by Sanz for to make a duet musical in the song Corazón parti'o. Unfortunately, Mena could not remember the lyrics of the chorus, improvising a confused hum and causing both catcalls of public and strong criticism on social networks. However, she managed to silence the boos and emerged victorious with Gaviota de Plata and Gaviota de Oro.
2017	LVIII	(Chile)	Rodrigo Villegas	Humorist	The humorist had to temporarily interrupt his routine in half due to the boos that came from the gallery, due to a security problem with some people from the audience. Before this and the confusion of Villegas, the hosts had to leave to clarify that the boos were due to this procedure and they were not for him. Despite this setback, he managed to finish with honors his routine, taking the two Gaviotas.
2018	LVIV	(Chile)	Bombo Fica	Humorist	The musical intervention of former reality girl Mariela Montero during the routine of humorist generated strong boos, which ended up bothering Montero and forcing the comedian to continue alone, reversing the discomfort of El Monstruo. In addition, the public did not want on stage the Chilean humorist Willy Benítez, who was invited by Bombo Fica in a part of his show for his long career; nevertheless, when Bombo gives his Gaviota to Benítez, El Monstruo was more understanding and relaxed towards the presentation of the comedian.
2018	LVIV	(Chile)	Jenny Cavallo	Humorist	While the comedian was finalizing her routine, she was interrupted by boos that came from the gallery due to a security procedure, because a woman in the audience had fainted during the show. Before the confusion of Cavallo, the animators had to go out to clarify to her that the boos were due to this procedure and they were not for her. Despite this setback, she managed to finish his routine by taking the Gaviota de Plata.
2025	LXIV	(Venezuela)	George Harris	Humorist	The comedian was not able to convince the audience. He was telling long stories about daily things, but seems like that type of humor was not well received by the Chilean audience. The boos started and the comedian was not able to control them, and the pressure make him to start attacking the audience with arrogance. This has caused that 3 times the presenters tried to help him to start his presentation, but again he failed 3 times until he dropped the mic and left.
