= 2020 Viña del Mar International Song Festival =

Viña del Mar International Song Festival 2020

Date and venue
- Final: 28 February 2020
- Venue: Quinta Vergara; Viña del Mar, Chile

Organisation
- Host broadcaster: Televisión Nacional de Chile, Canal 13 and Fox Channel Latin America
- Presenters: Martín Cárcamo; María Luisa Godoy

Vote
- Winning song: Chile, Vicente Cifuentes «Chillán» Argentina, Nahuel Pennisi «Avanzar»

The LXI Edition of the Viña del Mar International Song Festival, also known Viña 2020, took between 23 and 28 February 2020, having being conducted by Maria Luisa Godoy and Martin Cárcamo. It was organized by Televisión Nacional de Chile, Canal 13 and Fox Channel Latin America.

That year's edition is distinguished from others because it was held, despite the tense social and political environment experienced in Chile since October 2019, so the event was fully marked by the 2019 Chilean Crisis.

== Artists ==
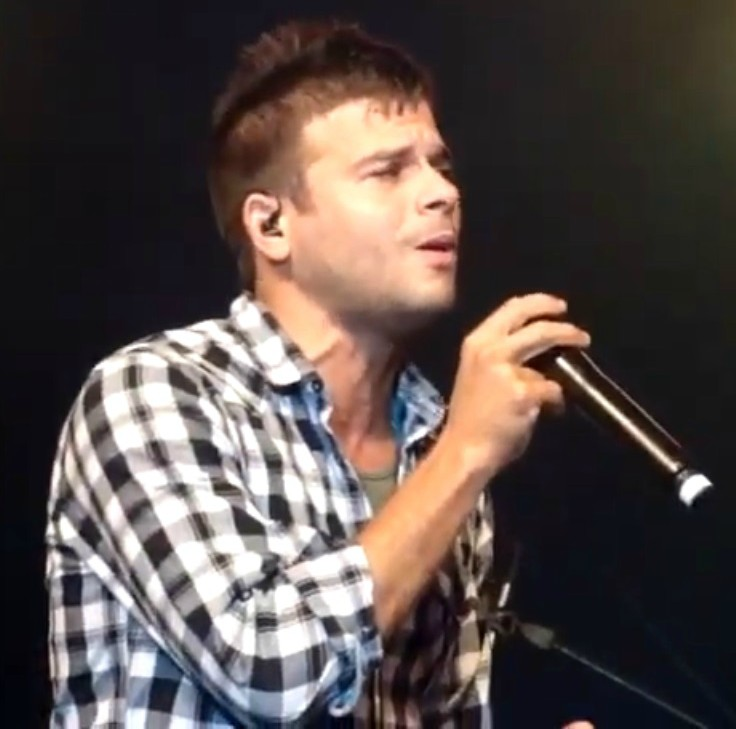
Pedro Capó was the debut singer in this edition of the festival.

As usual, the routines were divided into two types of entertainment: singing and comedy.

=== Singers ===
- (Puerto Rico) Ricky Martin.
- (Puerto Rico) Pedro Capó.
- (Chile) Mon Laferte.
- (Chile) Francisca Valenzuela.
- (Mexico) Ana Gabriel.
- (Argentina) Pimpinela.
- (Spain) Pablo Alborán.
- (Argentina) Luciano Pereyra.
- (United States) Maroon 5
- (Brazil) Alexandre Pires.
- (Puerto Rico) (Dominican Republic) Ozuna.
- (Chile) Denise Rosenthal.
- (Chile) Noche de Brujas.

=== Comedians ===
- (Chile) Stefan Kramer.
- (Chile) Javiera Contador.
- (Chile) Ernesto Belloni.
- (Chile) Fusión Humor.
- (Chile) Paul Vásquez.
- (Chile) Pedro Ruminot.

== Competitions ==
As every year, there is an international song competition, an international one, aimed at various musical themes of each country, and a folkloric competition, with a song typical of the folklore of the country represented. The winner is awarded with the most recognized prize of the contest: "La Gaviota de Plata".

This year, the results were as follows:

=== International ===
- 1st place:: Chile, Vicente Cifuentes «Chillán».
- 2nd place:: Ecuador, Johann Vera: «Perdón».
- 3rd place:: Argentina, Fran Vázquez: «Bailo con mi sombra».

=== Folkloric ===
- 1st place:: Argentina, Nahuel Pennisi: «Avanzar».
- 2nd place:: Chile, Soledad del Río: «Somos el Paraíso».
- 3rd place:: Colombia, Paula Arenas: «Buena para nada» .

== Controversies ==
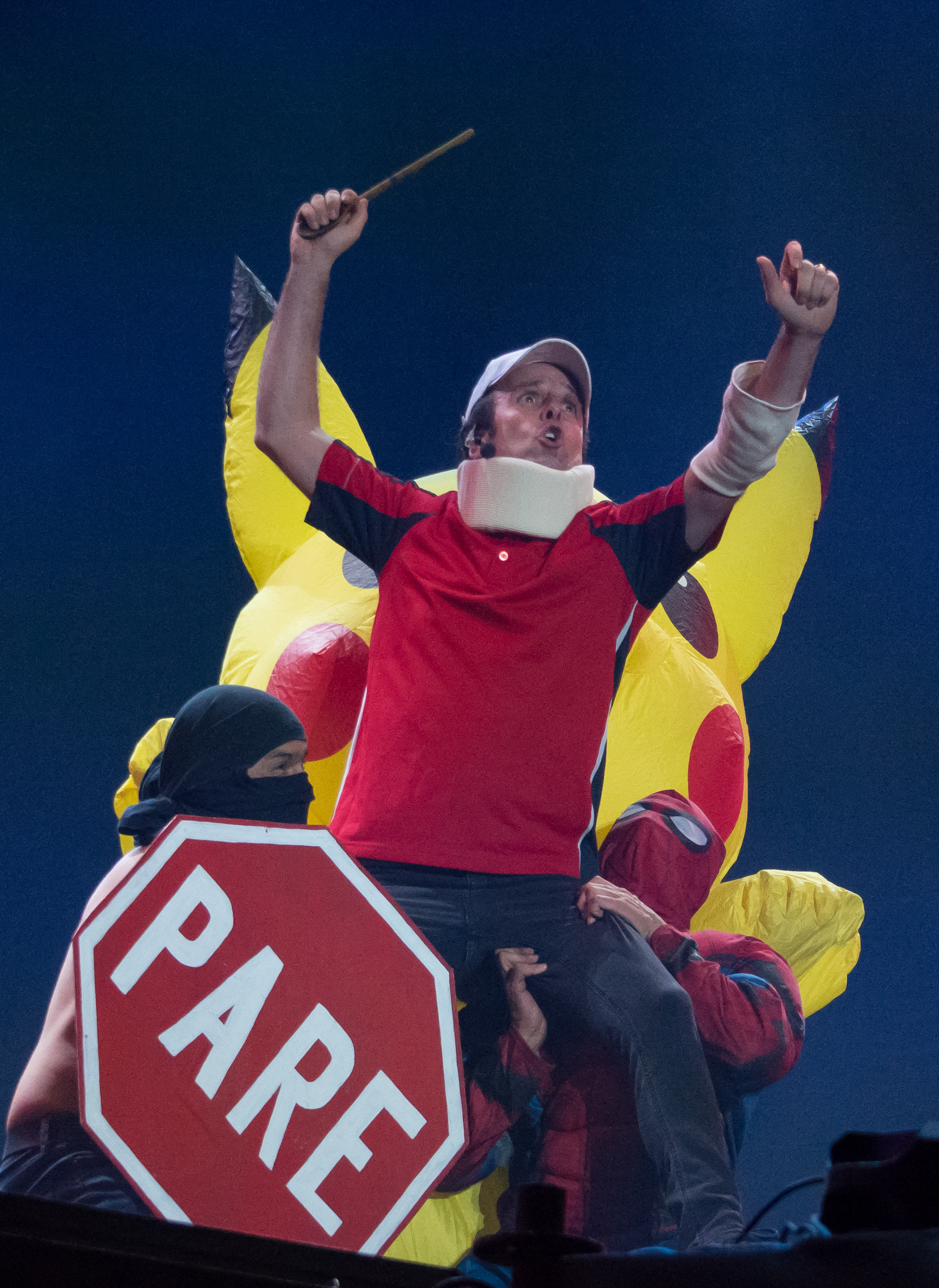
Comedian Stefan Kramer did a routine with many jokes and jokes directed against the Chilean "political class".

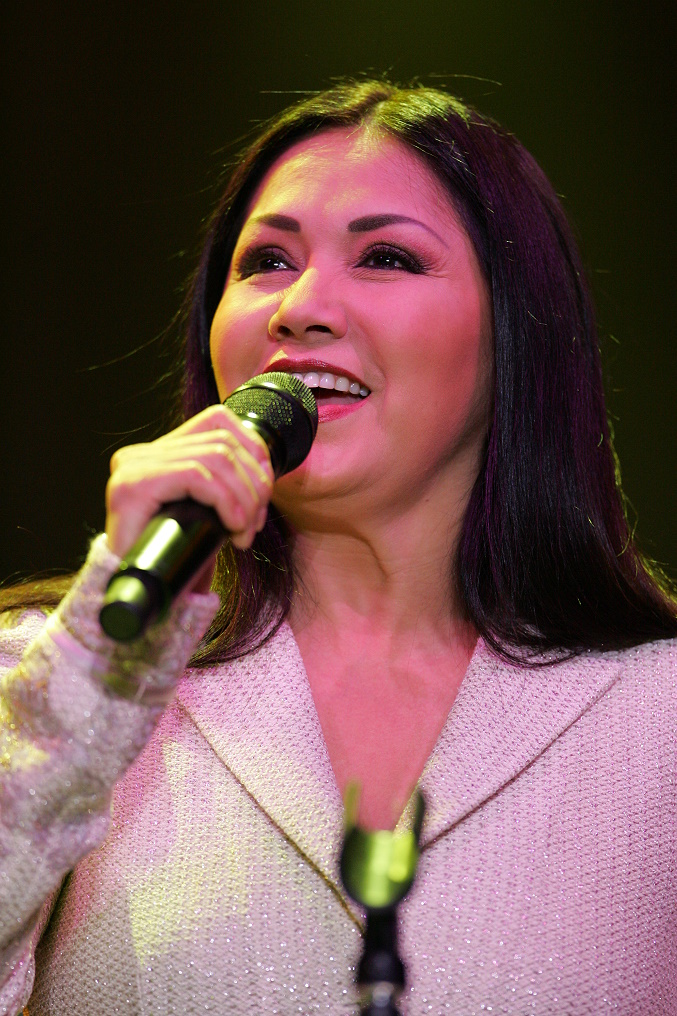
Ana Gabriel gave her opinion on the current situation in Chile, which had mixed responses from the public.

=== Political humor ===
Chilean comedians such as the "Fusión Humor" quartet or the humorist and imitator Stefan Kramer made comic routines laughing at controversial situations within the political-social landscape lived in Chile at the end of 2019, and early 2020. The organization was accused of censorship of humorous routines that made fun of politicians and the Government of Chile, mainly of the current president Sebastián Piñera.

=== Singer declarations ===
Popular Mexican singer-songwriter Ana Gabriel and Chilean singer Mon Laferte made political statements during their presentations. The Mon Laferte spoke about a police request for her to clarify her previous and severe accusation made against police in Chile during the protests. For its part, the Mexican singer acknowledged that she was not interested in politics, but that she was sorry that the people were harmed, comparing the situation in Chile with countries such as Nicaragua, Mexico or Venezuela.

=== Maroon 5 ===
On 27 February 2020, the American rock band Maroon 5 performed. The presentation, which began 29 minutes late, was listed as "mediocre" by the specialized press, inside and outside Chile. The BBC said that Adam Levine performed the songs with "lack of energy and out of tune", adding that the disappointment of the fans increased when videos were leaked, when he was leaving the stage, showing him angry and saying that "they were deceived", that it was a concert for television, and that Viña del Mar is a "shitty city". That created an atmosphere of rejection inside and outside of his fans who were very upset by the words of disrespect from the band's leader. Levine later posted on Instagram to apologized for the incident and the band said it had experienced technical difficulties with the audio feed to Levine's ear pieces. Nevertheless, many Chilean citizens have since retaliated against Levine by posting recipes of traditional Chilean dishes on his Instagram account's comment section.
