= Stefan Kramer (impressionist) =

Chilean entertainer

Stefan Kramer Solé
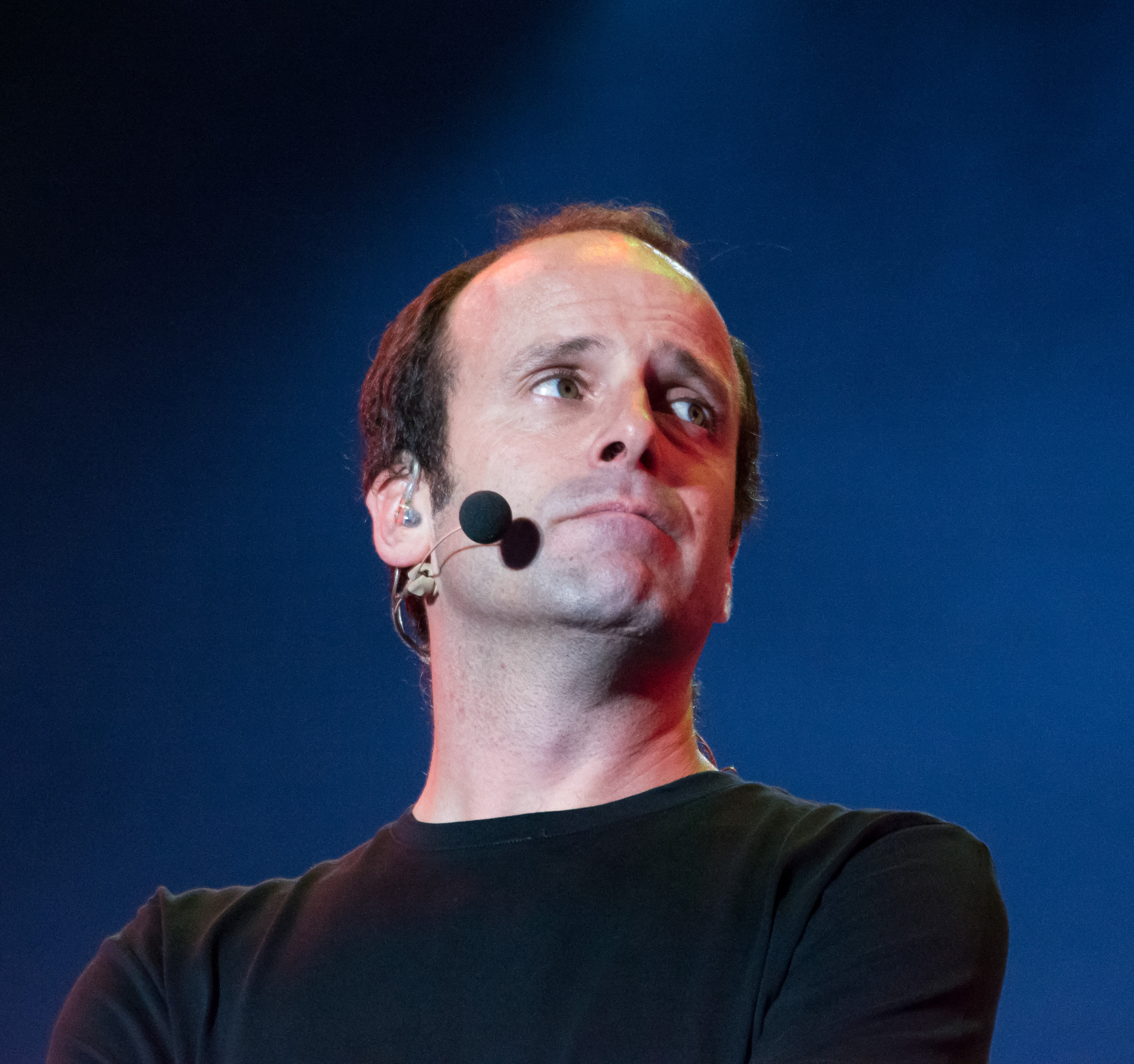
- Kramer in 2020
- Born: Stefan Kramer Solé; 19 February 1982 (age 43); Santiago, Chile
- Occupation(s): Impressionist, actor, announcer
- Years active: 1997–present
- Spouse: Paloma Soto (2005–present)
- Children: María Jesús (b. 2006); Santiago (b. 2009); Celeste (b.2010); Bruno (b.2017)
- Awards: Viña del Mar International Song Festival, 2008; *Gaviota de Plata; *Antorcha de Plata; *Antorcha de Oro; Copihue de Oro 2008; Best comedian Copihue de Oro 2010; Best comedian Copihue de Oro 2011; Best comedian Copihue de Oro 2012; Best movie (Stefan v/s Kramer); Copihue de Oro 2013; Best comedian
- Website: stefankramer.cl kramer.tv

Stefan Kramer Solé (born 19 February 1982) is a Chilean impressionist, actor, comedian and announcer. He is known in Chile for his ability to mimic accents, gestures and expressions of dozens of famous people in Chile, such as TV hosts, singers, politicians, sports players, sportscasters, and celebrities.

== Biography ==
Kramer comes from a German Swiss family in the Araucanía Region of southern Chile. He is married to singer Paloma Soto.

Kramer's first television appearance was as a contestant on ¿Cuánto vale el show? on Chilevisión. His debut as an impressionist was in the TVN television show Noche de Juegos, during the comedy section of Ponce Candidato, a character performed by Julián Elfenbein.

Kramer has participated in various television shows, such as Mekano (Mega), Amenaza Real (Canal 13) (performing Polimorphicuz, a man who suffers from multiple personality disorder), De Pe a Pá (TVN), REC and ¿Cuánto vale el show?, both programs from Chilevisión and hosted by Leo Caprile. In 2006 Kramer had a great success in the Huaso de Olmué Festival.

Kramer took part successfully in the second night of the Viña de Mar Festival in 2008. In a comedy routine that lasted almost 90 minutes, Kramer impersonated around 33 characters. The audience acclaimed and awarded him with two Antorchas (Oro and Plata – English: Gold and Silver Torchs) and a Gaviota de Plata (English: Silver Seagull). Many Chilean TV shows have taken advantage of the good rating that produces Kramer's routine and they have repeated it in uncountable occasions, without the comedian receives some money remuneration.

On 12 July 2009, Kramer appeared on TVN's Animal Nocturno, where he personified several presidential candidates, such as Marco Enríquez-Ominami, Eduardo Frei Ruiz-Tagle, and Sebastián Piñera. He also imitated football manager Marcelo Bielsa, which was met with praise.

In 2010, Kramer co-hosted with Felipe Camiroaga the TV show Halcón y Camaleón in TVN, where he achieved great success. During one of the shows, Kramer personified Bielsa, where he explained the alleged reasons for the impasse that he lived in La Moneda with the Chilean President Sebastián Piñera. Kramer previously taped a personification of Piñera, which caused displeasure within the Chilean Government, as it was held just when the former President Michelle Bachelet was invited.

On 2 December 2011, Kramer was again invited to the Telethon Theater, as the opening artist for that year's Teletón, where he imitated Miguel "Negro" Piñera, the brother of President Sebastián Piñera. For the 30th Anniversary of the Chilean Telethon, he performed at the closing ceremony at the National Stadium, where he imitated politicians and Teletón host Mario Kreutzberger (Don Francisco), of "Sábado Gigante" fame. Kramer was praised by Don Francisco himself. He repeated at the closures of the 2014, 2015, and 2016 editions.

On 26 May 2016, Kramer became the announcer of his own television show, called Kamaleón, el show de Kramer, and broadcast by TVN. Also, he was invited by Chilevisión in the new version of the El Club de la Comedia stand-up comedy show.

== Filmography ==
Year	Film	Characters	Director
2012	Stefan v/s Kramer	Himself – Various characters imitated	Stefan Kramer, Sebastián Freund and Eduardo Prieto
2013	El Ciudadano Kramer	Himself – Various characters imitated	Stefan Kramer and Javier Estévez
2014	Penguins of Madagascar	Short Fuse (Latin Spanish voice doubler)	Simon J. Smith and Eric Darnell

== List of personified characters ==
Sport
Country	Soccer Player	Nickname
Chile	Alexis Sánchez	Alerxi Sánchez / The Wonder Boy
Chile	Arturo Vidal	Artulo Vidall
Chile	Gary Medel	The Pitbull
Chile	Carlos Caszely	Cazely
Chile	Claudio Bravo	Captain Bravo
Chile	Jorge Valdivia	The Magician
Argentina	Lionel Messi	Lío
Chile	Marcelo Salas	Madselo Sadas
Portugal	Cristiano Ronaldo	
Chile	Mauricio Pinilla	
Chile	Iván Zamorano	
Uruguay	Luis Suarez	
Country	Tennis Player	Nickname
Chile	Fernando González	
Argentina	Horacio de la Peña	
Chile	Marcelo Ríos	Marcelo "Chinese" Líos
Chile	Nicolás Massú	Nico
Country	Technical Director	Nickname
Chile	Jorge Garcés	
Argentina	Marcelo Bielsa	Marcelo Piensa (Marcelo Thinks)
Chile	Eduardo Bonvallet	El Bomba (The Bomb)
Argentina	Diego Maradona	Diego Maradruga
Argentina	Jorge Sampaoli	
Chile	Manuel Pellegrini	
Portugal	José Mourinho	
Argentina	Juan Antonio Pizzi	Juan Antonio Pizzim
Country	Leader	Nickname
Chile	René Orozco	The Dr. Horoscope
Chile	Sergio Jadue	Sergio Jague
Country	Athlete	Nickname
Chile	Tomás González	

Politics
Country	Politician	Nickname
Chile	Eduardo Frei Ruiz-Tagle	Don Lalo
Chile	Francisco Vidal	Francisco Vinal
Chile	Jorge Arrate	Jorge a Ratos (Jorge At-Intervals)
Chile	Marcelo Trivelli	Marchelo Trivelli
Chile	Marco Enriquez Ominami	MEO (wordgame in Chilean Spanish meaning I piss)
Chile	Franco Parisi	France Parece (France Look like)
Chile	Pablo Longueira	Pablo Corteira
Chile	Pablo Zalaquett	Zazalaquett / The Mayor / Hablo Zalaquett (I speak Zalaquett)
Chile	Sebastián Piñera	Segastián Piñata / The President / Seba
Chile	José Piñera	
Chile	Rodrigo Hinzpeter	Hinzminator
Chile	Claudio Orrego	
Chile	Andrés Velasco	
Chile	José Antonio Gómez	Gómez
Chile	Nelson Ávila	Nelson Águila
Chile	Carlos Larraín	Don Carlos
Chile	Camilo Escalona	Don Camilo
Chile	Iván Fuentes	
Chile	Evelyn Matthei	
Chile	Michelle Bachelet	
Chile	Virginia Reginato	Virginia Rellenato / Tía Coty (Rellenato is a wordgame meaning pad and calf)
Bolivia	Evo Morales	
United States	Donald Trump	

Music
Country	Artist	Nickname
Spain	Alejandro Sanz	Alejandro Sinz Sed (Alejandro Without Thirst)
Chile	Alberto Plaza	Alberto Plaza de Armas (Alberto Barrack Square)
Puerto Rico	Chayanne	Chiyonne
United States	Eddie Vedder	
Argentina	Fito Páez	Fried Páez
Chile	Jorge González	J.G.
Colombia	Juanes	Juanos
Chile	Leo Rey	Leo Rey
United States	Limp Bizkit	
Chile	Luis Jara	Much Jara
Chile	Pablo Herrera	
Austria	Peter Rock	Old Rock
Chile	Raquel Calderón	Kel Calderón
Guatemala	Ricardo Arjona	RicArto Arjona (wordgame meaning very delicious Arjona)
Chile	Negro Piñera	El Negro (The Black) / Brown Piñera
Chile	Willy Sabor	Willy Savor
Argentina	Jorge Rojas	Jorge Colorado (Jorge Scarlet)
Argentina	Gustavo Cerati	Gustacho Cerity
Argentina	Vicentico	
United Kingdom	Ozzy Osbourne	Ozzo Bucco
Spain	Enrique Iglesias	
United States	Romeo Santos	

TV
Country	Announcer	Nickname
Chile	Kike Morandé	El Kike
Chile	Leo Caprile	
Chile	Felipe Camiroaga	
Chile	Martín Cárcamo	
Chile	José Miguel Villouta	
Chile	Sebastián Jiménez	Lindorfo
Chile	Gonzalo Feito	
Chile	Julio César Rodríguez	
Chile	Don Francisco	Don Francis
Chile	Rafael Araneda	El Rafa
Chile	Diana Bolocco	Dyana Bolloco
Cuba	Ana María Polo	
Chile	Francisco Saavedra	
Country	Reporter	Nickname
Chile	Amaro Gómez-Pablos	Amaro Pérez Pablos Gómez Silva
Chile	Fernando Paulsen	Paulsem
Chile	Fernando Solabarrieta	
Chile	Matías del Río	
Chile	Julio Martínez	
Chile	Italo Passalacqua	
Chile	Claudio Palma	Claudio Calm
Chile	Emilio Sutherland	
Country	Actor	Nickname
Chile	Héctor Noguera	Tito Noguera
Canada	Jim Carrey	
Chile	Marisela Santibáñez	Maribeer Santibáñez
Chile	Gonzalo Valenzuela	Valenzuela
Chile	Daniel Alcaíno (Yerko Puchento and Peter Veneno)	
Chile	Fernando Farías	

Others
Country	Personified	Nickname
Chile	Leonardo Farkas	Leonardo Parkas / The pianist
Chile	Roberto Dueñas	Teddy Dueñas
Chile	Jordi Castell	Flordi Pastel
Chile	Arturo Longton	Arturo Pichi / The Producer / Arturo London
Chile	Rafael Garay	
