= 2016 Viña del Mar International Song Festival =

- Presented by: Rafael Araneda; Carolina de Moras

Production
- Production locations: Quinta Vergara Amphitheater, Viña del Mar, Chile

Original release
- Network: Chilevisión
- Release: February 22 – February 27, 2016

The LVII Edition of the Viña del Mar International Song Festival, also known as Viña 2016, took place from February 22 to 27, 2016 at Quinta Vergara Amphitheater, in the Chilean city of Viña del Mar.

== Development ==
	Overture
	Folk Competition
	International Competition
G / G	Gaviota de Plata / Oro
UTC -3	Chile Time

=== Day 1 - Monday 22 ===
N°	Name	Description	Show	Tuning	Awards	Theme List / Routine
O	(Chile) | Power Peralta	Festival Overture	21:58 - 22:05		—	
1	(Mexico) | Marco Antonio Solís	Latin singer of ballads.	22:26 - 23:58	42	G - G	List: 1. Sin pensarlo; 2. Cuando te acuerdes de mí; 3. Si te pudiera mentir; 4. Morenita; 5. La venia bendita; 6. De mil amores; 7. Tú me vuelves loco; 8. Dónde estará mi primavera; 9. Tu cárcel (Los Bukis); 10. A que me quedo contigo; 11. Viva el amor; 12. O me voy o te vas; 13. Sigue sin mí; 14. Yo vendo unos ojos negros (cover Los Huasos Quincheros); 15. El perdedor; 16. Mi eterno amor secreto; 17. Si no te hubieras ido; 18. Más que tu amigo
2	(Chile) | Edo Caroe	Humorist.	00:21 - 01:33	41	G - G	
3	(Venezuela) | Ricardo Montaner	Latine pop singer	02:38 - 04:29		G - G	List: 1. Lo mejor está por venir; 2. A dónde va el amor; 3. Será; 4. El poder de tu amor; 5. Solo con un beso; 6. Castillo azul; 7. Resumiendo; 8. Se desesperaba; 9. Soy feliz; 10. Vamos pa' la Conga; 11. Tan enamorados; 12. Bésame la boca; 13. Me va extrañar; 14. En el último lugar del mundo; 15. Déjame llorar; 16. La cima del cielo

=== Day 2 - Tuesday 23 ===
N°	Name	Description	Show	Tuning	Awards	Theme List / Routine
1	(Italy) | Eros Ramazzotti	Italian pop and ballads singer	21:57 - 22:40	39,7	G - G	List: 1. La sombra del gigante; 2. Donde hay música; 3. Tierra prometida; 4. Estrella gemela; 5. Flor nacida ayer; 6. Più che puoi; 7. Si bastasen un par de canciones; 8. Una historia importante / Ahora tú / Aurora; 9. Una idea especial; 10. Otra como tú; 11. Por ti me cansaré; 12. Fábula; 13. Una emoción para siempre; 14. Cosas de la vida; 15. Fuoco nel fuoco (Fuego en el fuego); 16. La cosa más bella
2	(Chile) | Rodrigo González	Stand-up comedy humorist	22:59 - 00:40	39,6	G - G	
3	(Spain) | Ana Torroja	Ballads singer	01:33 - 03:21		G - G	List: 1. La fuerza del destino; 2. Hoy no me puedo levantar; 3. A contratiempo; 4. Cruz de navajas; 5. Ya no te quiero; 6. Los amantes; 7. Maquillaje; 8. Mujer contra mujer (fear Paty Cantú); 9. El 7 de Septiembre; 10. Duele el amor (fear Gepe); 11. Ay qué pesado; 12. Un año más; 13. Hijo de la luna; 14. Corazones; 15. Barco a Venus; 16. Me cuesta tanto olvidarte

=== Day 3 - Wednesday 24 ===
N°	Name	Description	Show	Tuning	Awards	Theme List / Routine
1	(Spain) | Alejandro Sanz	Latin pop and ballads singer	22:13 - 23:41		G - G	List: 1. Quisiera Ser; 2. Desde Cuando ft. Paty Cantú; 3. No Me Compares; 4. La Música No Se Toca; 5. Amiga Mía/Mi Soledad y Yo/Y Si Fuera Ella; 6. Corazón Partío ft. Javiera Mena; 7. Un Zombie A la Intemperie ft. Ana Torroja; 8. Looking For Paradise; 9. No Es Lo Mismo; 10. ¿Lo Ves?; 11. A Que No Me Dejas; 12. Viviendo Deprisa/Pisando Fuerte
2	(Chile) | Natalia Valdebenito	Stand-up comedy humorist	23:51 - 01:01	43	G - G	
3	(Chile) | Luis Jara	Singer and TV presenter	02:04 - 03:10		G - G	List: 1. Cerca; 2. No se olvidarte; 3. Amor prohibido; 4. ¿Qué puedo hacer?; 5. Quiero amanecerte lentamente; 6. Que no daría; 7. Envidia; 8. Las cosas cambian; 9. Ámame; 10. Mañana; 11. Un golpe de suerte

=== Day 4 - Thursday 25 ===
N°	Name	Description	Show	Tuning	Awards	Theme List / Routine
1	(United States) | Lionel Richie	Singer	22:08 - 23:43		G - G	List: 1. Running With the Night; 2. Penny Lover; 3. Easy/My Love; 4. Ballerina Girl; 5. You Are; 6. Stuck on You; 7. Brick House/Fire; 8. Three Times a Lady; 9. Lady (You Bring Me Up); 10. Endless Love; 11. Say You, Say Me; 12. Dancing On The Ceiling; 13. Hello; 14. All Night Long (All Night); 15. We Are The World
2	(Chile) | Pedro Ruminot	Stand-up comedy Humorist	23:58 - 0:52		G	
3	(United Kingdom) | Rick Astley	Singer	01:50 - 03:10		G - G	List: 1. Together Forever; 2. It Would Take a Strong Man; 3. She Wants to Dance With Me; 4. Keep Singing; 5. When I Fall in Love; 6. Take Me to Your Heart; 7. Hold Me in Your Arms; 8. Ain’t Too Proud to Beg; 9. Uptown Funk; 10. Cry For Help; 11. Pry With Me; 12. Whenever You Need Somebody; 13. Never Gonna Give You Up

=== Day 5 - Friday 26 ===
N°	Name	Description	Show	Tuning	Awards	Theme List / Routine
1	(Spain) | Pablo Alborán	Singer	22:12 - 23:40		G - G	
2	(Chile) | Los Locos del Humor	Comedians	00:01 - 01:18		G - G	
3	(United States) | Nicky Jam	Singer	02:23 - 03:32		G - G	

=== Day 6 - Saturday 27 ===
N°	Name	Description	Show	Tuning	Awards	Theme List / Routine
1	(Puerto Rico) | Wisin	Singer			G - G	
2	(Chile) | Ricardo Meruane	Comedian				
3	(Chile) | Javiera Mena	Singer			G - G	
4	(Puerto Rico) | Don Omar	Singer			G - G	

== Jury ==
- (Chile) | Luis Jara
- (Argentina) / (Venezuela) | Ricardo Montaner (Foreman)
- (Chile) | Javiera Mena
- (Spain) | Ana Torroja
- (United Kingdom) | Rick Astley
- (Chile) | Humberto Sichel
- (Cuba) / (United States) | Ismael Cala
- (Chile) | Renata Ruiz
- (Chile) | Julio César Rodríguez
- (Chile) | Sandra Ossandón (Jury of the people)

== Competition ==
=== International Competition ===
Country	Title	Performer	Authors	Position
(Chile)	«Te quiero»	Cristián and Lucía Covarrubias		Winner
(Australia)	«Move on»	Allison Elgueta		Finalist - Winner of The Best Performer
(Mexico)	«Vas a ver»	Alexander Acha		Finalist
(Colombia)	«Noche de bodas»	Salo		Deleted
(El Salvador)	«Todo para ti»	Paty Menéndez		Deleted
(United States)	«Inesperadamente»	Tom Lowe		Deleted

=== Folk Competition ===
Country	Title	Performer	Authors	Position
(Panama)	«Viene de Panamá»	Afrodisiaco	Miroslava Herrera; Tatiana Ríos	Winner
(United States)	«Canoita»	Paulina Aguirre	Paulina Aguirre and Benjamín Venegas	Finalist - Winner of The Best Performer
(Peru)	«Sandunguera»	Maribel Chira	Maribel Chira	Finalist
(Argentina)	«Soy chacarera»	Martín Bravo and Lucas Ibáñez	Martín Bravo and Lucas Ibáñez	Deleted
(Chile)	«Invicto»	Alexis Venegas	Alexis Venegas	Deleted
(Colombia)	«Por el norte y por el sur»	Alé Kumá	Leonardo Gómez; Luis Díaz	Deleted

== Queen of the Festival ==
=== Candidates for Queen of the Festival ===
#	Country	Candidate	Occupation	Participate in	Channel	Results
1°	Chile	Nicole "Luli" Moreno	Dancer and model	Bienvenidos	Canal 13	144 Votes; 49,49%
2°	Argentina / Chile	Vanesa Borghi	Model and TV presenter	Mucho gusto and Morandé con compañía	Mega	122 Votes; 41,92%
3°	Argentina	Giselle Gómez Rolón	Model, vedette and panelist			25 Votes; 8,59%
Total Votes						291 Votos
