= Ricardo Meruane =

Chilean humorist and wood worker

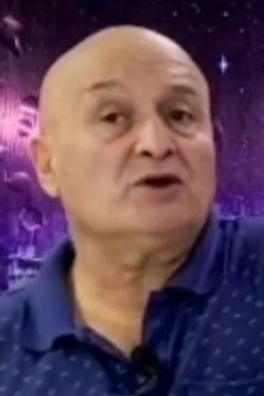
- Born: 7 December 1956 (age 69); Santiago, Chile
- Education: Universidad Técnica Federico Santa María
- Occupations: Humorist and wood worker
- Family: Nelly Meruane (aunt); Lina Meruane (niece)

César Ricardo Meruane Meruane (Santiago de Chile, December 7, 1956) is a Chilean humorist and wood worker of Palestinian origin. His 2016 "noctule" joke went viral in 2024.

== Biography ==
He was born in 1956, being one of the nine children of the immigrant Palestinian Chucre Meruane, merchant dedicated to the sale of fabrics. He is nephew of the actress Nelly Meruane and uncle of the writer Lina Meruane. He studied as a technician in tool and die making at the Universidad Técnica Federico Santa María, from which he graduated in 1981. That same year, while doing his professional practice in a plastics company, he competed in the program ¿Cuánto vale el show?, being this his first television appearance.

A year later, he decided to devote himself entirely to humor, working in different nightclubs in Santiago, until he was discovered by producer Emilio Rojas, who in 1983 took him to the programs Sábados gigantes and Noche de gigantes, both hosted by Don Francisco, where he gained national notoriety. Parallel to this, he ventured into the café concert format, presenting his shows Fotocopia feliz del Edén (1984) and La Viroca (1988).

In the late 1980s he returned for a stint on the international version of Sábado gigante, now broadcast from Miami, United States, where he reached the peak of his comedy career and managed to be seen by millions of viewers around the world. During the 1990s he participated in several television programs, including several editions of the Teletón and the International Festival of Humor 1995, where he shared the stage with Juan Verdaguer and Raúl Vale, among other international comedians. In 1998 he premiered his café concert Prejuicio final.

In February 2011 he performed for the first time at the Viña del Mar International Song Festival, appearing behind singer Sting, which provoked boos from the audience, known as El monstruo. After his failure he was away from the stage for several months, and in 2012 he starred in a reality show called Gracias no se molesten in Vía X, whose title comes from a phrase that Meruane mentioned repeatedly during his presentation in Viña del Mar. That same year he performed at the Festival Viva Dichato 2012, where his failure was repeated.

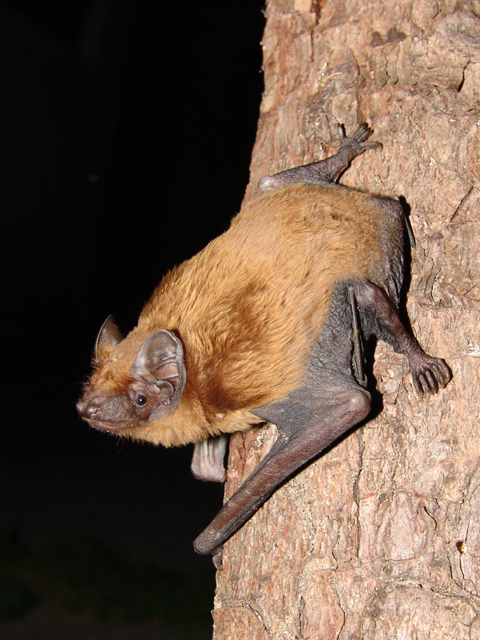
In 2016, during the LVII Edition of the Viña del Mar International Song Festival, the humorist Ricardo Meruane performed a routine where he included the "noctule" joke, achieving great popularity later on.

In 2015 he returned to the stage presenting his show Lucrania... el deber nos llama. Part of that routine is the one he presented in his second appearance at the Viña del Mar Festival in February 2016, where he was again booed by "El Monstruo", however, the routine would be revalued years later with several jokes of it reaching great popularity; in particular, the "noctule" joke (related to the possession of exotic pets), which became a cult joke in Chile as well with the "chlorine" joke relating the country code top-level domain for Chile, ".cl" with the symbol of the chemical element present in the periodic table of the elements.

He currently has a wood carving business.

In 2021, he appeared in the world's first film made with "Deepfake" titled "Una película de zombies".

== See also ==
- Noctule
