= 2009 Viña del Mar International Song Festival =

- Date: February 23, 2009 - February 28, 2009
- Location: Quinta Vergara, Viña del Mar, Chile
- Hosted by: Soledad Onetto, Felipe Camiroaga

Television/radio coverage
- Network: Canal 13, TVN

The 2009 Viña del Mar International Song Festival was held from Monday 23 February until Saturday 28 February. This festival was the number 50, and had a special award for the 50 years, the "Gold Song", elected between the winner songs from 2001 to 2008 versions of Festival. Finally, "Gold song" in the folk contest was "Cuecas Al Sol" (2005 winner), and in the international contest was "Ayer te vi" (2001 winner).

The television channels from the festival this year is "Canal 13" and "TVN", and was held in Viña del Mar, Chile

== Hosts ==
- Soledad Onetto
- Felipe Camiroaga

== Acts ==
=== Monday 23 ===
Artist	Awards
Joan Manuel Serrat	"Silver Torch"
Contest Folk	—
Camila	"Silver Torch", "Golden Torch" & "Silver Seagull"
Contest International	—
La Noche	"Silver Torch", "Golden Torch" & "Silver Seagull"

=== Tuesday 24 ===
Artist	Awards
Verónica Villarroel	"Silver Torch", "Golden Torch" & "Silver Seagull"
Juanes	"Silver Torch", "Golden Torch" & "Silver Seagull"
Contest Folk	—
Fernando Ubiergo	"Silver Torch", "Golden Torch" & "Silver Seagull"
Contest International	—
KC and the Sunshine Band	"Silver Torch", "Golden Torch" & "Silver Seagull"

=== Wednesday 25 ===
Artist	Awards
Carlos Santana	"Silver Torch", "Golden Torch" & "Silver Seagull"
Contest Folk	—
Leonardo Farkas	"Silver Torch"
Contest International	—
Dinamita Show	"Silver Torch", "Golden Torch" & "Silver Seagull"
Roger Hodgson	"Silver Torch", "Golden Torch" & "Silver Seagull"

=== Thursday 26 ===
Artist	Awards
Folkloric Ballet	—
Simply Red	"Silver Torch", "Golden Torch" & "Silver Seagull"
Contest Folk	—
Paolo Meneguzzi	—
Contest International	—
Manpoval	—
R.K.M & Ken-Y	"Silver Torch", "Golden Torch" & "Silver Seagull"

=== Friday 27 ===
Artist	Awards
Luis Fonsi	"Silver Torch", "Golden Torch" & "Silver Seagull"
Folk Competition Final	—
International Competition Semifinal	—
Daddy Yankee	"Silver Torch", "Golden Torch" & "Silver Seagull"

=== Saturday 28 ===
Artist	Awards
Natalino	"Silver Torch" & "Golden Torch"
Marc Anthony	"Silver Torch", "Golden Torch" & "Silver Seagull"

== Appearances ==
- Antonio Vodanovic did a special appearance at the opening of the festival to say goodbye to the audience, taking the "Silver Torch", after leaving the animation of the festival in 2004.
- Verónica Villarroel appeared at the opening of the second day as a surprise for the 50 years of the festival.
- On the third night, the Chilean businessman Leonardo Farkas did a surprise appearance, which lasted 15 minutes approximately.

== Trivia ==
- The singer of KC and the Sunshine Band, Harry Wayne Casey, suffered a drop in the presentation of the band.
- The Italian-Swiss singer Paolo Meneguzzi suffered failures of sound at the start of his presentation after to the annoyance of the public by the end of the presentation of Simply Red.

== Gold Song ==
=== International ===
Country	Artist	Song	Year
Argentina	Víctor Heredia	"Ayer Te Vi"	2001
Argentina	Ricardo Pald & Valeria Lynch	"Soy Tu Angel"	2002
Spain	Chema Purón	"Este Amor Es Tuyo"	2003
Chile	Alexis Venegas	"Tus Ojos"	2004
Peru	Jessica Sarango	"Mi Alma Entre Tus Manos"	2005
Costa Rica	Humberto Vargas	"Dilo De Una Vez"	2006
Spain	Pedro Fernández	"Cuando Quieras Volver"	2007
Italy	Doménico Protino	"La Guerra De Los 30 Años"	2008

- Winner: Argentina — Victor Heredia — "Ayer te ví"
- Awards: "Golden Lyre"

=== Folk ===
Country	Artist	Song	Year
Chile	Danny Rodríguez	"Whipala"	2001
Peru	Carlos Rincón	"Juramento"	2002
Argentina	Fernando Barrientos	"Pintadita"	2003
Argentina	Víctor Heredia	"Bailando Con Tu Sombra"	2004
Chile	Isabel Parra	"Cueca Al Sol"	2005
Chile	Elizabeth Morris	"Canción De Agua y Viento"	2006
Colombia	Leonardo Gómez & Diana Hernández	"Me Duele El Alma"	2007
Peru	Damaris Mallma	"Tusuy Kusum"	2008

- Winner: Chile — Camila Méndez & Isabel Parra — "Cuecas Al Sol"
- Awards: "Golden Lyre" (Contest Folk), "Silver Seagull" (Best Interpreted)

== Jury ==
=== International ===
- Juanita Parra
- Paolo Meneguzzi
- Catherine Fulop
- Martín Cárcamo
- Fernando Ubiergo
- Bastián Bodenhöfer
- Leonardo Farkas

=== Folk ===
- Rafael Zamarripa
- Katherine Salosny
- Fernanda Hansen
- Piero
- Sergio Campos

== Queen of the Festival ==
Catherine Fulop (Jury)	181 votes
Nicole Pérez (as Jennifer's)	15 votes
Lucila Vit	40 votes
Lucía Pérez (Contest International)	29 votes

- Winner: Catherine Fulop

== Ugly King ==
Leonardo Farkas (Jury)
Paolo Meneguzzi (Jury)
Leo Rey (Singer of "La Noche")
Augusto Schuster (Singer of "Amango")

- Winner: Leo Rey

== International Coverage ==
- (United States) A&E Latin America
- (Colombia) CMI Televisión
- (Bolivia) ATB Red Nacional
- (Dominican Republic) Telesistema Dominicano
- Televicentro Nicaragua
- (Mexico) Televisa
- Televicentro Honduras
- (El Salvador) Canal 2
- (Argentina) Telefé
- (Panama) Canal 11 SERTV
- (Canada) Tlñ
- (Costa Rica) Repretel
- Canal 13 Guatemala
- (Paraguay) TV Cerro Corá
