= Lira de Oro =

Song award

The Lira de Oro (English: Golden Lyre) was the award that originally given to the winners in International - between 1961 and 1968 - and Folk Competitions — between 1961 and 1964 -; in the Viña del Mar International Song Festival. From 1965 to 1968, this competition was awarded with the Arpa de Oro—. In 1969, the Lira de Oro was replaced by the Gaviota de Plata.
