= Gervasio =

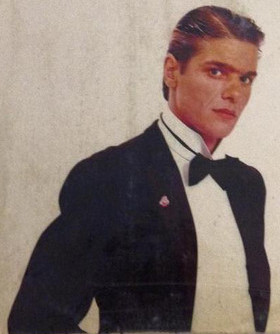
- Gervasio in the 1980s.

Background information
- Also known as: Gervasio
- Born: José Gervasio Viera Rodríguez; 27 February 1948; Cerro Largo, Uruguay
- Died: 28 October 1990 (aged 42) Talagante, Santiago Metropolitan Region, Chile
- Genres: New wave
- Occupations: Singer-songwriter, musician
- Instruments: Vocals, guitar
- Years active: 1965–1990
- Labels: RCA, BMG, Alerce

José Gervasio Viera Rodríguez (27 February 1948 – 28 October 1990), also simply known as Gervasio, was an Uruguayan singer who achieved popularity in Chile in 1983, when he won the international competition of the Viña del Mar International Song Festival, with the song "Alma, Corazón y Pan". One of Gervasio's most famous compositions is "Con Una Pala y Un Sombrero", which he wrote in honour of his father, who died of lung cancer.

== Life ==
José Gervasio was born in Cerro Largo, Uruguay, on 27 February 1948. During his first years of life, he stayed in a children's home, and left school at 9 years old. His first public appearance as singer was in 1965, and "he did not leave music anymore, because through it he could interact with people from the upper class of Uruguay," Canal 13 reported.

Gervasio emigrated to Santiago de Chile in 1967, participating in Mario Kreutzberger's TV show Sábados Gigantes. Shortly afterwards, he already had some radio hits in Chile: "La Mujer Esdrújula" (which he performed in Sábados Gigantes), and "La Azafata". Gervasio left Chile for some time, and in Argentina he formed the band Los Náufragos, with which he had hits such as "Linda Chiquilina."

He married for the first time in Buenos Aires, Argentina, in the mid-1970s, and left music temporarily. He shortly broke up, and formed a duet with Helda Rozas, with whom he had his second children, and worked for about a year. Gervasio broke up with Rozas, and then returned to Chile, in 1982.

In February 1983, he participated in the Viña del Mar International Song Festival, representing Uruguay in the international competition, with his song "Alma, Corazón y Pan." Gervasio eventually won.

Gervasio got engaged with the Chilean model Mónica Aguirre, with whom he had four children: Yanara, Nahuel, Millaray, and Lincoyán.

In May 1984, Gervasio was accused of attempted rape by a twenty-year-old woman. The case was dismissed ten months later for lack of merit. In September 1988, he was accused for the third time of the same crime, but he was dismissed on every occasion for lack of evidence. Due to a sexual abuse allegation against him, in early 1990, Gervasio had to perform himself a psychological examination that revealed abnormal characteristics in his personality. He was arrested on 5 March of that year, and stayed fifty-two days in the Penitenciaría de Santiago prison, until he was released on bail.

His economic problems, and lack of employment, forced him to begin working in a Maipú restaurant.

== Death ==
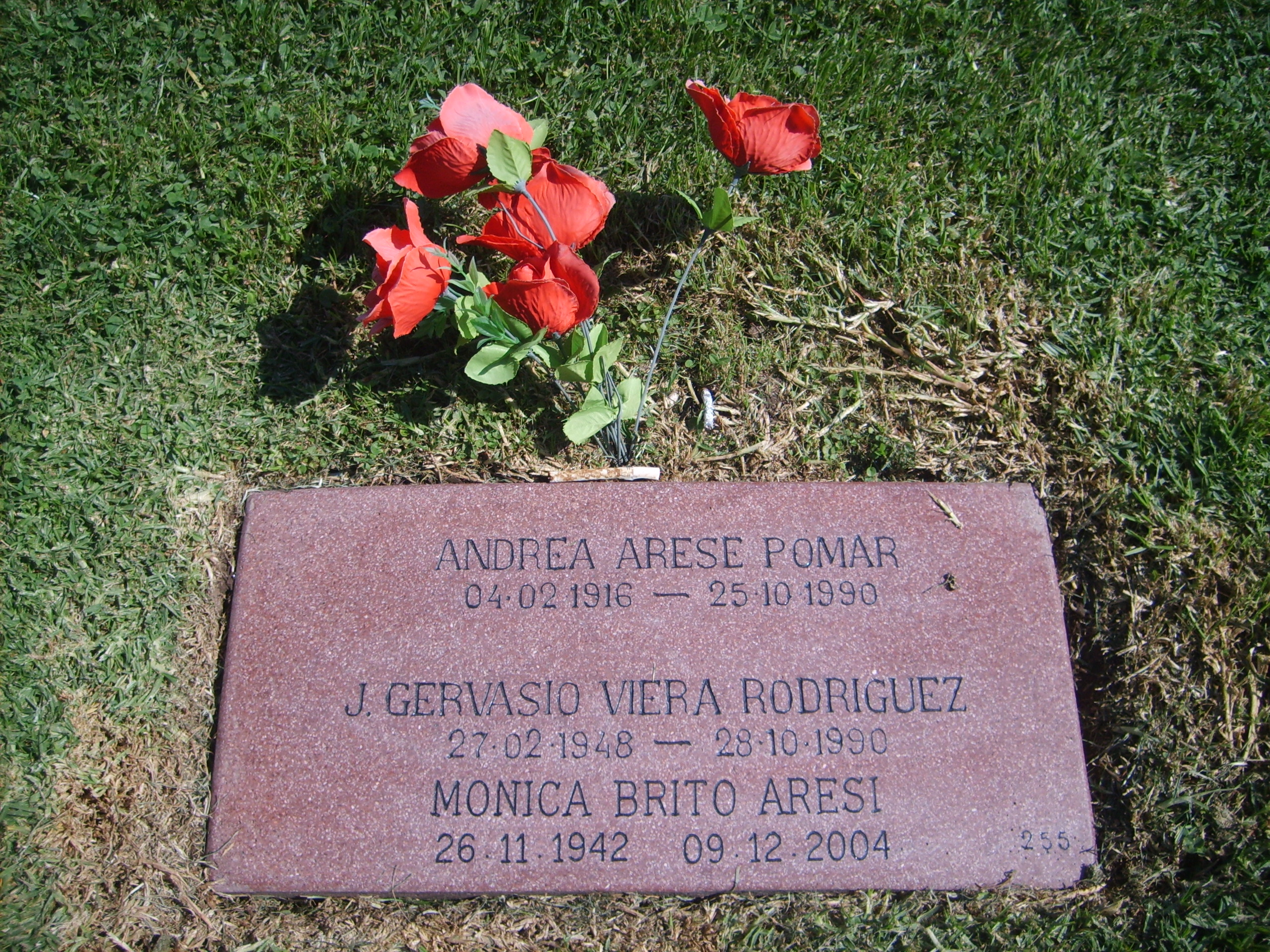
Gervasio's gravestone in the Parque del Sendero cemetery Parque del Sendero (Maipú), in Maipú, Santiago de Chile.

Gervasio was due to appear before the Appeals Court on 28 October 1990 in order to confront the woman who had accused him of sexual abuse; however, two days before, his body was found hanging, in an abandoned house of Talagante, Santiago Metropolitan Region.

It was reported he had committed suicide, but Gervasio's sister, Blanca Viera, managed to prompt an investigation on the matter. In 1996, a case was opened, but it was dismissed two years later because evidence could not be found to prove the involvement of third parties. At the day, the actual cause of death remains unknown.

In 2013, another investigation claimed that Gervasio did not take his own life but might have been murdered.

== Discography ==
As solo artist

- Gervasio (1968 – RCA Victor / Arci Music)
- Alma, corazón y pan (1983 – RCA Argentina / BMG Chile)
- Tiempo de muñecas (1985 – BMG)
- Gervasio (1989 – Alerce)

Compilation albums (with other artists)

- Voces sin fronteras (1987 – EMI Odeon)
- La Nueva Ola en 30 grandes éxitos (1997 – Warner Music)
