= Giselle Gómez Rolón =

Argentine model, showgirl and panelist

- Born: October 30, 1988 (age 37); Recoleta, Argentina
- Occupation(s): Model, showgirl and panelist
- Modeling information
- Hair color: Blonde
- Eye color: Brown

Giselle Gómez Rolón is an Argentinian-born television star, model, and former beauty pageant winner formerly based in Chile. She has appeared on television programs including Toc Show, Fox Fit, Morandé con Compañîa, and Golazo Pop. In 2016, she won the Miss Reef and Queen of the Festival of Viña del Mar. In 2014, she appeared in a minor role in the film Arrebato. As of 2023, she was living in Miami, Florida.

== Biography ==
Gomez Rolón began her modeling career at the age of 19. She also had small theatrical roles. Gómez Rolón was panelist of the programmes Tiempo Extra of TyC Sports and Uno más uno tres of Canal 26 In January 2016 she went to Chile where she was a panelist on the Toc Show programme on UCV Television. She won in the Miss Reef beauty contest and was a candidate for Queen of the Festival of Viña del Mar.

== Television ==
- 2012-2014 Tiempo Extra TyC Sports
- 2013 Animales Sueltos América
- 2013-2015 Uno más uno tres Canal 26
- 2016 Toc Show UCV Television
- 2016 Todos juegan UCV Television
- 2016 El show después del late Vive
- 2016 Primer Plano Chilevisión
- 2016 Morandé con Compañía Mega
