= Arpa de Oro =

The Arpa de Oro (English: Golden Harp) was the award given to those who were winners of the Folk Competition of Viña del Mar International Song Festival among 1965 y 1968 replacing the Lira de Oro, original award of this competition from 1961 to 1964, that was reserved as an exclusive prize for the International Competition. In 1969, the Arpa de Oro was replaced by the Gaviota de Plata.
