= Mucho Gusto =

Song composed by Percy Faith

"Mucho gusto"

Song by Percy Faith

from the album Mucho Gusto! More Music of Mexico
- Released: October 1, 1961
- Recorded: March 1961, Los Angeles
- Genre: Instrumental, Orchestral
- Length: 2:10
- Label: CBS Records
- Composer: Percy Faith

"Mucho gusto" is an instrumental piece originally recorded by Percy Faith for the 1961 album Mucho Gusto! More Music of Mexico. The piece is, like the rest of the album, influenced by Mexican music. It has a high, galloping tempo and an advanced arrangement, where the melody is played by alternating strings, brass and percussion. The piece is known for its use of whistles and whips, as well as instruments that are typical of Mexican music, like guitars, maracas and trumpets.

Mucho gusto is Spanish for "very nice (to meet you)".

== Appearances in other media ==
- In Sweden it is best known as the theme music to the radio show program Sportextra almost since it started in 1961.
- In 1982 a cover in Swedish was made where Swedish actor and comedian Claes Eriksson wrote lyrics to the song, which was sung by members of the comedy group Galenskaparna och After Shave under the name "Bara sport" ("Just sports") for the revue Skruven är lös (The screw is loose). The song's title refers to the Sportextra theme song.

== See also ==
- Percy Faith and His Orchestra – Mucho Gusto, official fan site.
