= Gaviota (award) =

Viña del Mar International Song Festival award

The Gaviota (English: Seagull) is an award that is given to those who are winners of International and Folk Competitions of Viña del Mar International Song Festival, and also to the artists who participate in it by popular demand asking loudly be delivered.

The award have seagull-shaped and the tail has a lyre, inherited icon from first award was delivered at the Quinta Vergara, the Lira de Oro. The seagull is bathed in silver or gold and inserted into a wooden base, except the Gaviota de Platino, which is inserted into a translucent base.

The trophy was designed in 1968 by Carlos Ansaldo and Claudio di Girólamo, and developed by the company Broncerias Chile. There are three types of Gaviotas: Gaviota de Plata, Gaviota de Oro (first awarded in 1999 to Ricardo Arjona, Guatemalan singer) and Gaviota de Platino (first awarded in 2012 to Mexican singer Luis Miguel). A fourth prize, Gaviota de la Paz (first awarded in 1991 to Puerto Rican singer Chayanne) was given in some events.

Manufacturing base award is worth approximately $250,000 CLP, some US$500.

== Gaviota de Plata ==
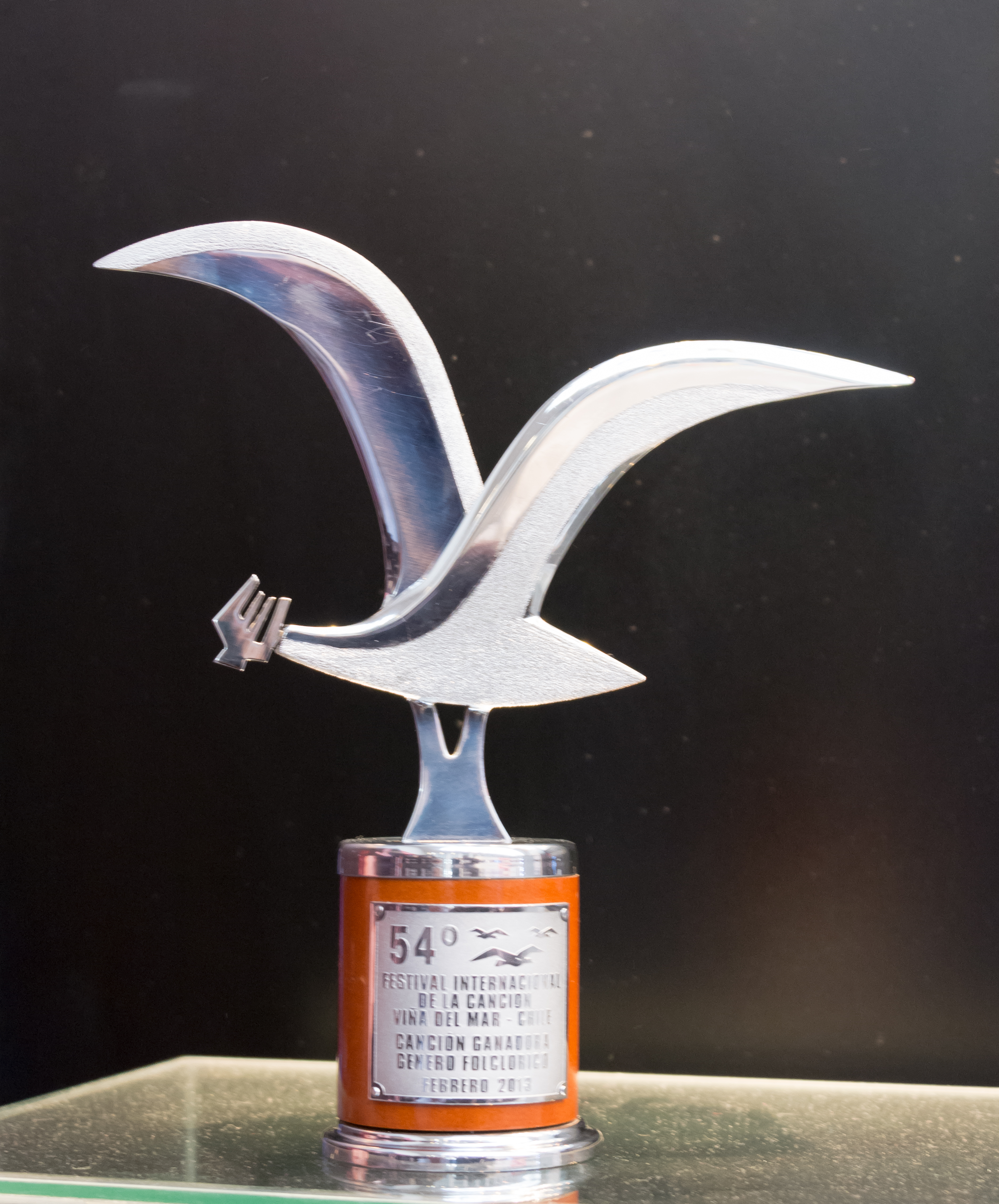
The Gaviota de Plata

The Gaviota de Plata (English: Silver Seagull) is usually the first prize given to an artist at the request of the public during his presentation. The award is plated in silver, and hence its name.

In 1969, this award replaces both the Lira de Oro -the original prize for International Competition between 1961 and 1968 and for the Folk Competition from 1961 to 1964— and the Arpa de Oro -the prize for Folk Competition between 1965 and 1968—. The first time the award was given to an artist who did not participate in the International Competition was at the 1972 Festival Internacional de la Canción de Viña del Mar, when the comedian Bigote Arrocet was granted. At first delivery, this it was exceptional, but it was subsequently more frequent, until it becomes a tradition.

At the 2000 Viña del Mar International Song Festival, the Spanish singer Enrique Iglesias threw his Gaviota de Plata he had won to the audience, sparking a controversy and repudiation by the public of the "Quinta", known as "El Monstruo", to the singer for this fact.

== Gaviota de Oro ==
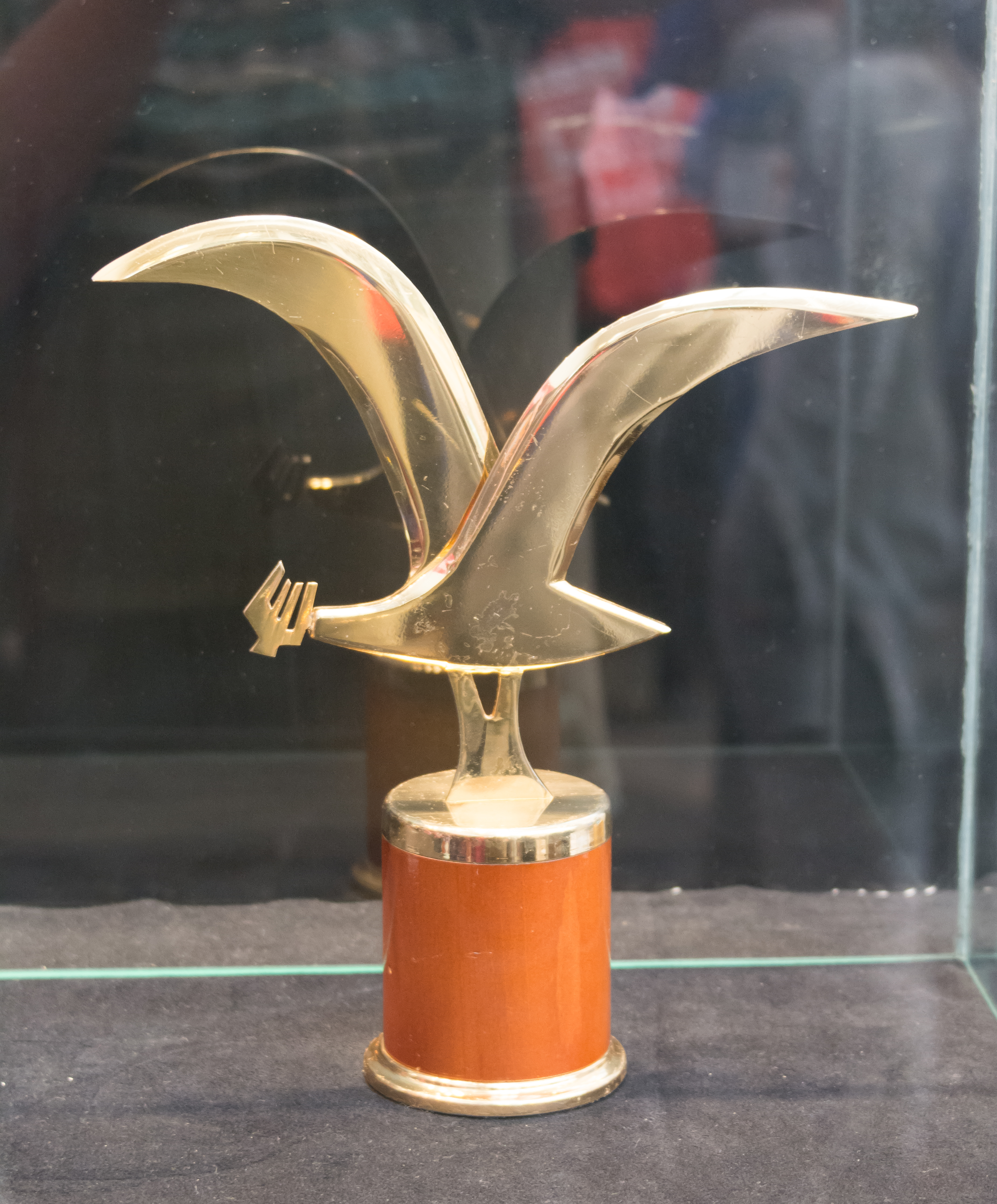
The Gaviota de Oro

The Gaviota de Oro (English: Golden Seagull) is usually the maximum prize given to an artist at the request of the public during his presentation. The award is plated in gold, and hence its name.

This award was to be established at the 1999 Viña del Mar International Song Festival to be given to Juan Gabriel in recognition of his successful career; however, Gabriel retired a few days before his presentation at the Festival. In its place, Ricardo Arjona received the award.

At the 2000 Viña del Mar International Song Festival, the next year, tried that this award was reserved only for the winner of the International Competition, since in that event the best song in the history of the Festival was chosen, but eventually it began to be delivered indiscriminately. As an attempt to regulate the delivery of Gaviotas de Oro, the Antorcha de Oro emerged. The Gaviota de Oro was not delivered at the 2002 Viña del Mar International Song Festival, but was restored at the 2011 Viña del Mar International Song Festival.

== Gaviota de Platino ==
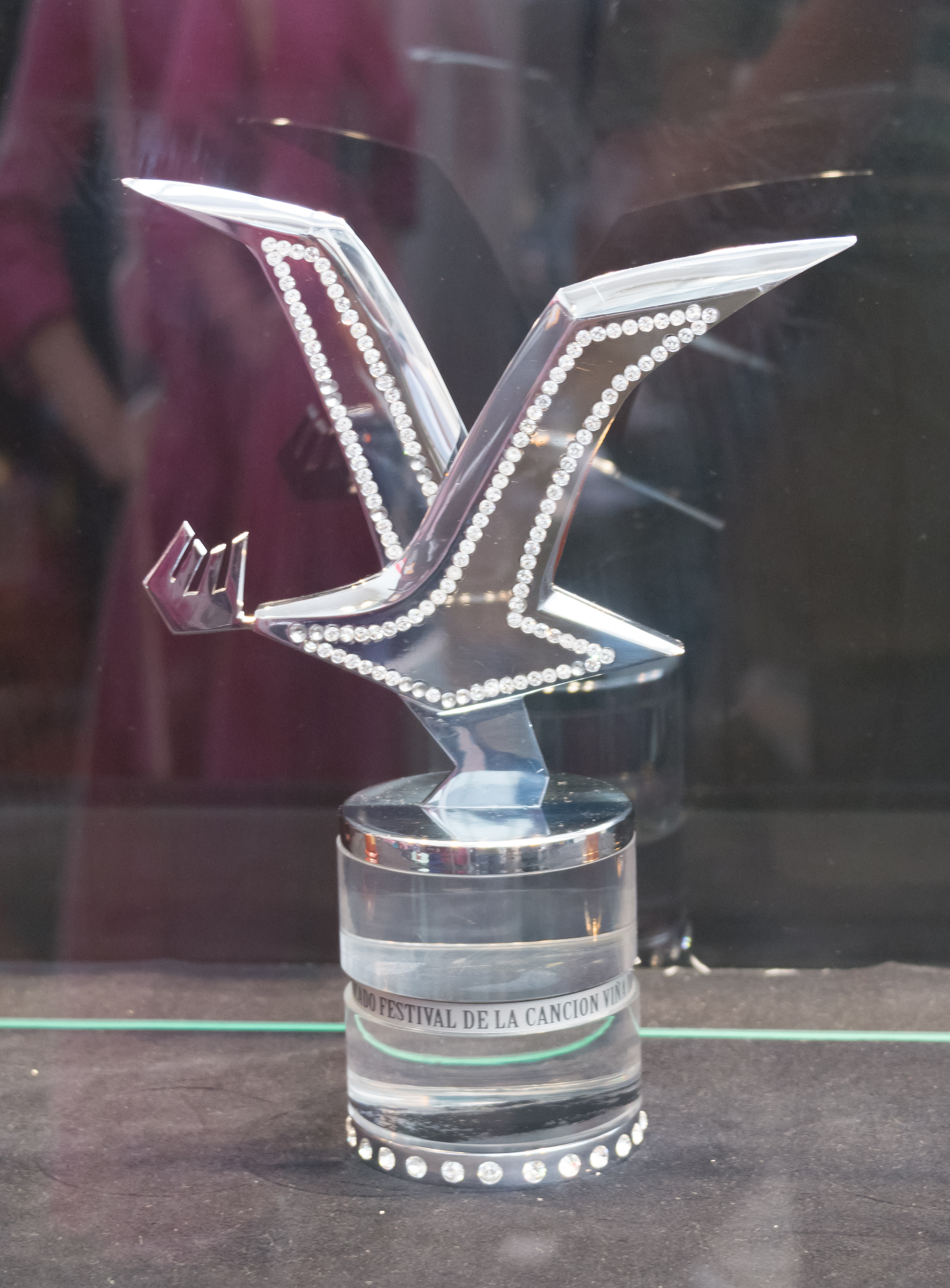
The Gaviota de Platino

The Gaviota de Platino (English: Platinum Seagull) is currently considered the most important award that can be delivered at the festival; is manufactured and delivered exclusively for artists who have had an outstanding musical career, prior determination of the organizers.

As of 2026, this award has been given six times. The inaugural Gaviota de Platino was granted to Luis Miguel, in recognition of his 30-year career at the 2012 Viña del Mar International Song Festival. The second time to Isabel Pantoja at the 2017 Viña del Mar International Song Festival, in appreciation of both her career and deceased Mexican singer Juan Gabriel, friend of the singer and composer of a good part of her artistic work. In this time, the award was destined for Juan Gabriel due to the large number of presentations at the festival; however, his visit was interrupted due to his death in August 2016.

The award is made from rhodium chromium, platinum group element, and has 85 insets of Swarovski crystal. The bottom holding the trophy also has blue- and white insets. The prize has an estimated value of CLP 500 000, a US$1000.

== Gaviota de la Paz ==
The Gaviota de la Paz (English: Peace Seagull) was first given in 1991 with Puerto Rican singer Chayanne as the first recipient.
