= 2006 Viña del Mar International Song Festival =

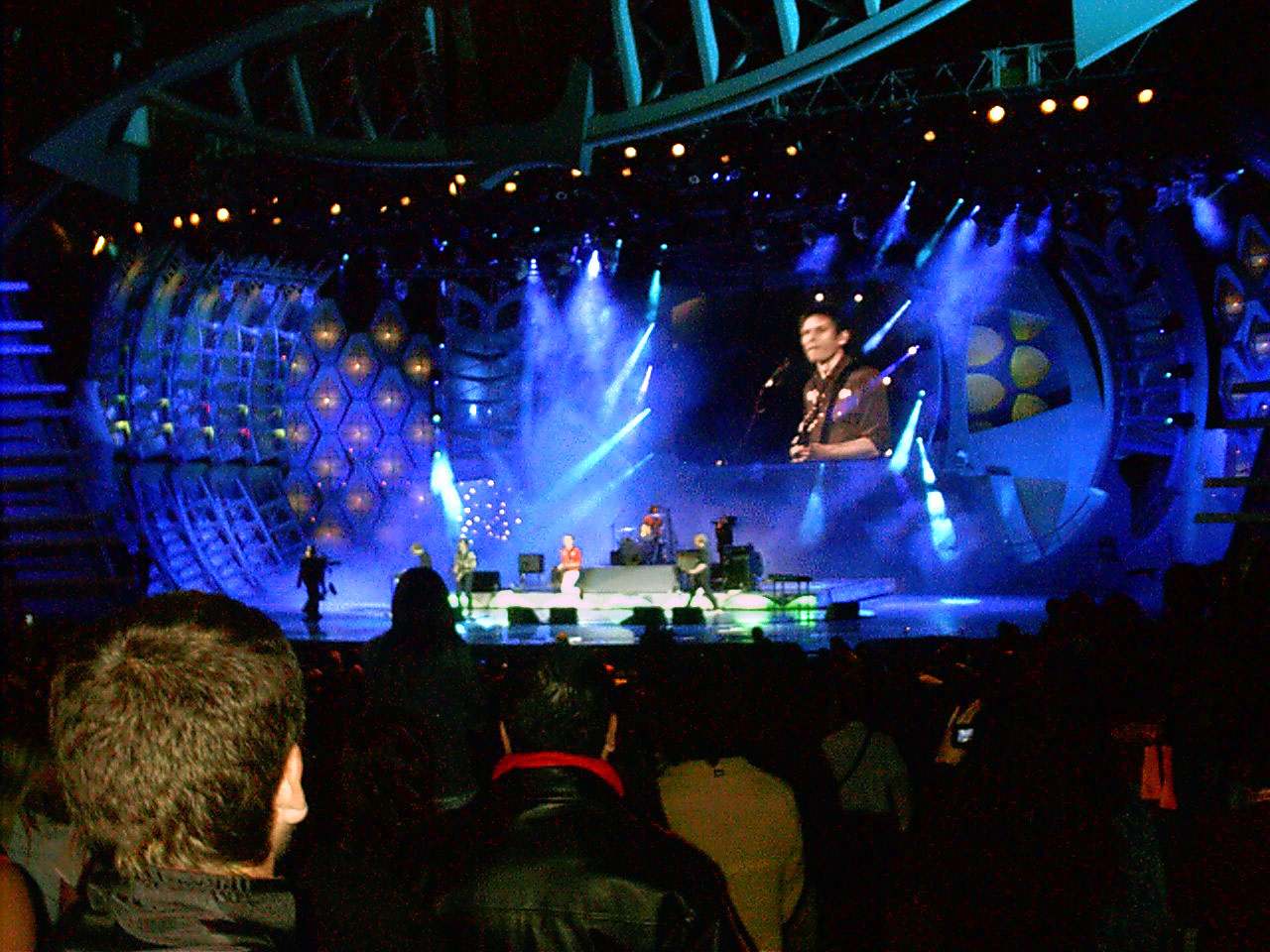
- Franz Ferdinand at Viña del Mar International Song Festival 2006
- Presented by: Sergio Lagos; Myriam Hernández

Production
- Production locations: Quinta Vergara Amphitheater, Viña del Mar, Chile

Original release
- Network: Canal 13
- Release: 22 February – 27 February 2006

The 2006 Viña del Mar International Song Festival, or simply 2006 Viña del Mar Festival, was held from 22 to 27 February 2006, in the Quinta Vergara Amphitheater, Viña del Mar, Chile. Transmitted and organized by Canal 13, it was led by Ricardo de la Fuente and presented by Sergio Lagos and Myriam Hernández.
