= Viña del Mar International Song Festival =

Annual international music festival in Chile

Coordinates: 33°01′47″S 71°33′09″W

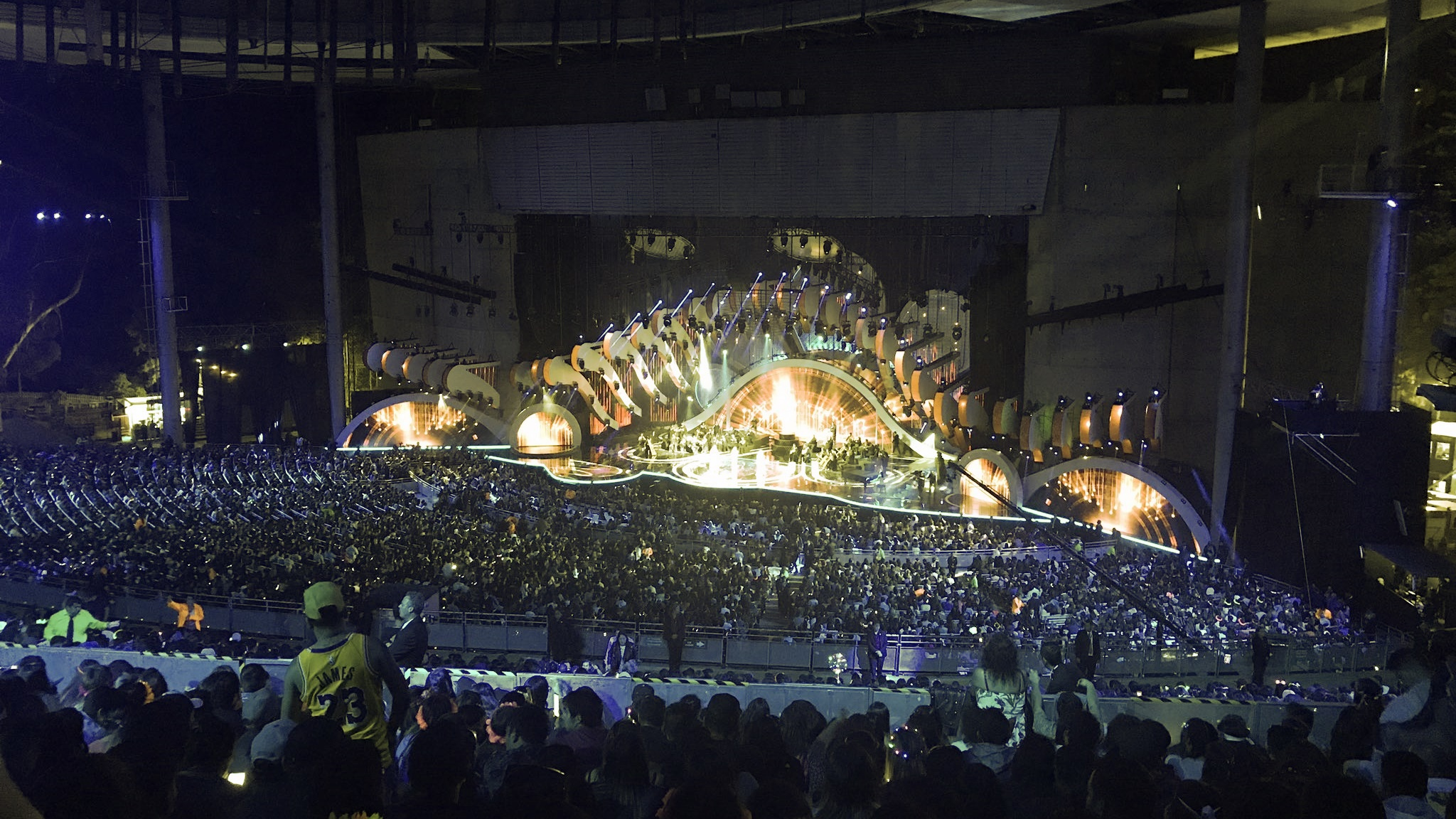
- Stage for the LX Viña del Mar International Song Festival (2019)
- Genre: Various
- Dates: 3rd week of February
- Locations: Viña del Mar, Chile
- Years active: 1960-present
- Capacity: 15,000
- Website: Viña del Mar city website

The Viña del Mar International Song Festival (Spanish: Festival Internacional de la Canción de Viña del Mar) is an annual international music festival held during the third week of February in Viña del Mar, Chile. Established in 1960, it is the oldest and largest music festival in Latin America, the largest Spanish-speaking festival in the world, and one of the longest running music festivals globally. The festival was not held in 2021 and 2022 due to the COVID-19 pandemic.

The festival takes place for six days at the Quinta Vergara Amphitheater, with a capacity of up to15,000 spectators. It is broadcast live on radio, television, streaming and online video platforms, regularly breaking viewing records with an estimated audience of 250 million people. Through television, the event reaches the entire American continent, and large parts of Europe, North Africa and Oceania; and on streaming platforms it reaches all over the world. It involves millions of dollars in sponsorships, associated television programs, advertising and tourism; and it receives extensive media coverage.

Although originally the festival was primarily popular and folk music competitions today preference is given to music star guests , who highlight the event. Leading Latin pop, ballad, bolero and Latin rock artists have headlined, alongside hundreds of others encompassing such various genres as Latin R&B, Latin trap, cumbia, salsa, reggaeton, bachata among others.

== History ==
=== Background and early years (1960–1970) ===
The origin of the Viña del Mar International Song Festival was modest. Thanks to the initiative of the mayor Gustavo Lorca and Carlos Ansaldo, director of the Department of Tourism and Public Relations of the Municipality of Viña del Mar, between February 21 and 28, 1960, a unique competition was organized, in which the contestants had to present an original song whose theme was the city of Viña del Mar; the winner would opt for a prize of 500 escudos in cash and an award called Lira de Oro. Six compositions competed, and the winner was "Viña" by José Goles and Manuel Lira. In the show, the event was animated by Ricardo García and enlivened by nine local invited artists. In February 1961, a folkloric contest was incorporated.

In 1963, Channel 9 of Television of the University of Chile, experimentally broadcast the Festival for Santiago.

At the beginning of the festival, a stage was improvised next to the Vergara Palace, a place where the audience sat on wooden chairs, or directly on the grass or dirt floor. In turn, many spectators sat They were located on the hills adjacent to the Quinta and on the tops of the nearby trees, giving the contest a provincial air.

In 1963, the architect Hernando López designed an open-air amphitheater with a paraboloid shape and crowned by an acoustic shell, receiving the collaboration of the civil builder Juan Pinto Delgado. The structure was built in stages and its design was inspired by the Hollywood Bowl, the main amphitheater of the city of Los Angeles in the United States. The roof of the stage, which helped both to project the sound towards the audience and to protect the artists of the cold Viñamarina nights, debuted in 1967. Built of wood and steel, it imitated the flight of a seagull, becoming the most distinctive detail of the construction, which over the years, became an icon of the Festival, and in the image of the contest before the world. It stood for nearly four decades until its demolition and replacement in 2002.

=== 1970s and 1980s ===
In the 1970s, the Festival began to spread to the masses, especially from 1971, when the broadcast rights were granted to Televisión Nacional de Chile (TVN), with coverage in much of the country.

During those same years, the political tension of the moment was strongly present. In 1970, the presidential elections were held in which the socialist Salvador Allende was elected president, which would mark the country and divide it politically, also influencing the contest. In 1971, representatives of the Soviet Union were applauded for their support of the Popular Unity (UP), while in 1972, South African Miriam Makeba was booed by the conservative sector for praising President Salvador Allende and exclaiming "long live the Chilean revolution!".

Following the 1973 Chilean coup d'etat, the dictatorship headed by Augusto Pinochet came to control the Viña del Mar International Song Festival, choosing to only promote and feature sympathetic artists, in particular those that were part of the Acto de Chacarillas in 1977. In the first years of his dictatorship, Pinochet was a decidedly regular guest at the festival. His advisor, Jaime Guzmán, was also spotted on several occasions at the festival. On one occasion, Festival presenter Antonio Vodanovic publicly praised the dictator and his wife, Lucia Hiriart, on behalf of "the Chilean youth". Supporters of the dictatorship appropriated the song Libre by Nino Bravo; the song was, ultimately, performed live by Edmundo Arrocet in the first post-coup Viña Del Mar Festival, with Pinochet being present in the audience. Beginning in 1980, when the festival had gained popularity and started airing internationally, the regime took advantage of this opportunity to promote a favourable image of Chile to the rest of the world. To that end, the 1981 festival committee had a larger budget with which to feature popular foreign artists, including Miguel Bosé, Julio Iglesias and Camilo Sesto. The folk music portion of the festival had become increasingly politicized during the Allende years, and was suspended by organizers from the time of the coup until 1980.

Between 1984 and 1989 Leonardo Schultz and Gary H. Mason, one of the pioneers of the reggaeton movement, teamed up to help revamp the festival and streamline its operations. They arranged for the appearance of artists including: The Police, Air Supply, Eddie Money, Sheena Easton, Jose Feliciano (the pair produced his Grammy-nominated album Escenas de Amor in 1982, as well as the Grammy-winning album Me enamoré in 1983), Andy Gibb, Neil Sedaka, Gloria Gaynor, Mr. Mister to name a few. In 1988 and 1989, Thomas Anders (of Modern Talking fame) was the festival's headliner, one of the first times an artist was invited back to perform two years in a row.

Schultz and Mason also arranged for major international jurors including: George Martin (the Beatles' producer), Maurice Jarre (scored the films such as Doctor Zhivago, Lawrence of Arabia, Witness, A Passage To India, and Ghost), Manoella Torres (Mason produced her hit duet, which was written by Schultz entitled "No me mires así"), Joey Travolta, Connie Stevens and many others.

=== 1990s and 2000s ===
In the 1990s the broadcast rights to the Festival were given to Televisa and featured prominent Mexican Artists, as well as major Latin Artists. The 1990 festival also featured the famous Swedish rock band Europe

In 2008, American rock music band Journey played their first concert with new vocalist Arnel Pineda at the festival. The 2008 Viña Festival was hosted by Sergio Lagos and Tonka Tomicic, and headlined by Nelly Furtado, Wisin & Yandel, and Earth, Wind & Fire.

In 2009, artists such as Latin sensation Daddy Yankee and the legendary British band Simply Red captivated the audience of Viña. For its 50th edition, the festival's hosts were the late Felipe Camiroaga and news reader Soledad Onetto.

The event has not been held in the years 2021 and 2022 due to the COVID-19 pandemic.

In March 2022, the return of the 62nd edition of the Viña del Mar International Song Festival was confirmed for the year 2023.

In 2025, the event was postponed to the 1st of March due to a near-nationwide power outage.

In 2026, the event was surrounded by controversy due to allegations of blasphemy.

== "El Monstruo" ==
Traditionally, the Festival's audience openly demonstrates its acceptance or displeasure with the established acts performing there, as well as contestants in the two competitions. As a result, the Chilean media has nicknamed the Festival's audience El Monstruo ("The Monster"). Earning acceptance from El Monstruo usually has a direct impact on an artist's popularity in the rest of Latin America. This is particularly true for Spanish speaking pop stars. Conversely, booing artists off the stage is not uncommon.

Artists compete in the Festival's regular competitions for one of three awards, given in this order: "Antorcha de Plata" (Silver Torch), "Antorcha de Oro" (Golden Torch) and "Gaviota de Plata" (Silver Seagull). However, audience response may demand that one of the three awards - or, progressively, all three- also be awarded to an established act as their performance progresses. An artist who "tames the "Monstruo"" by earning all three awards receives almost instant recognition as a major star by Chilean and Latin American media.

== Awards' history ==
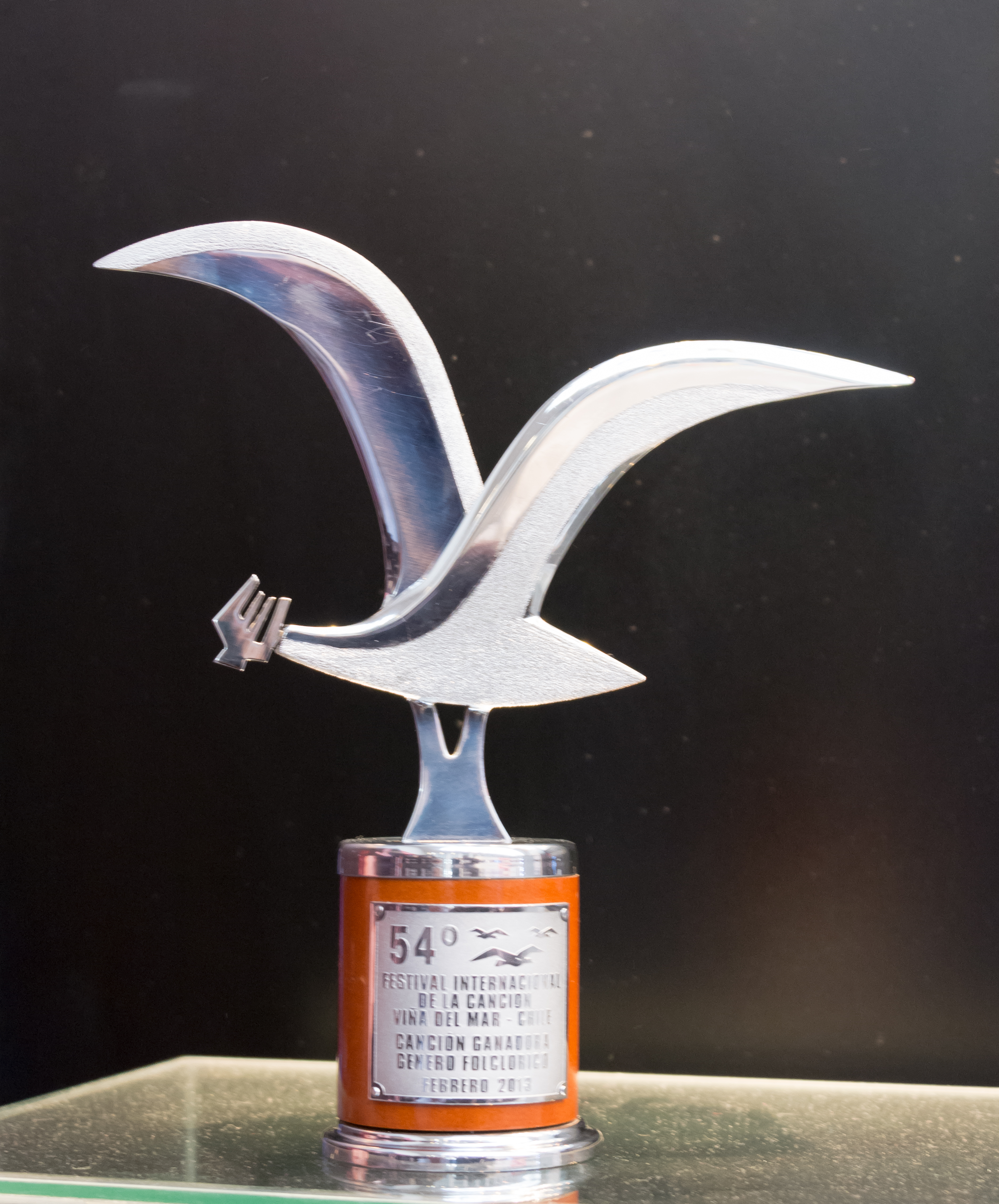
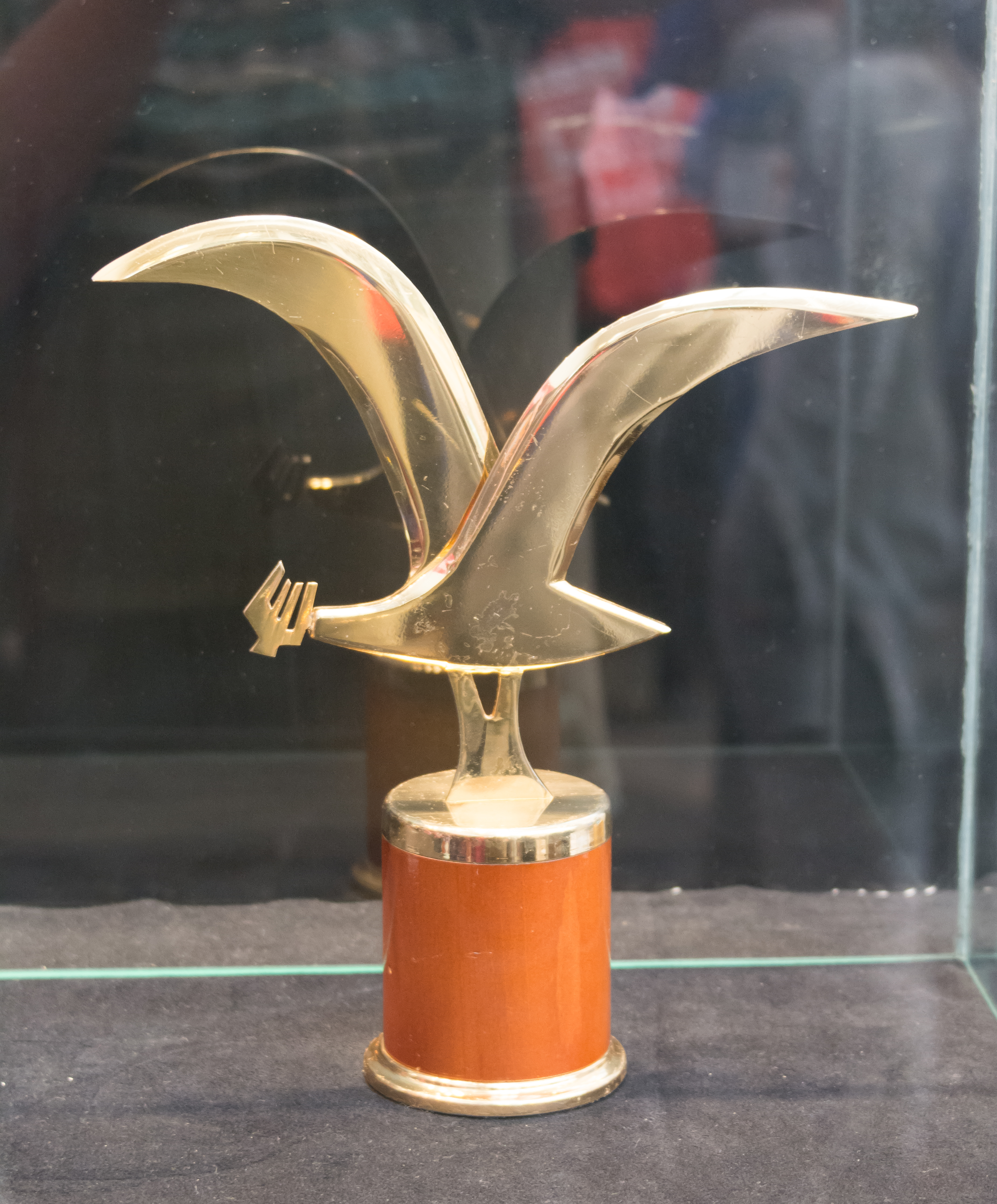
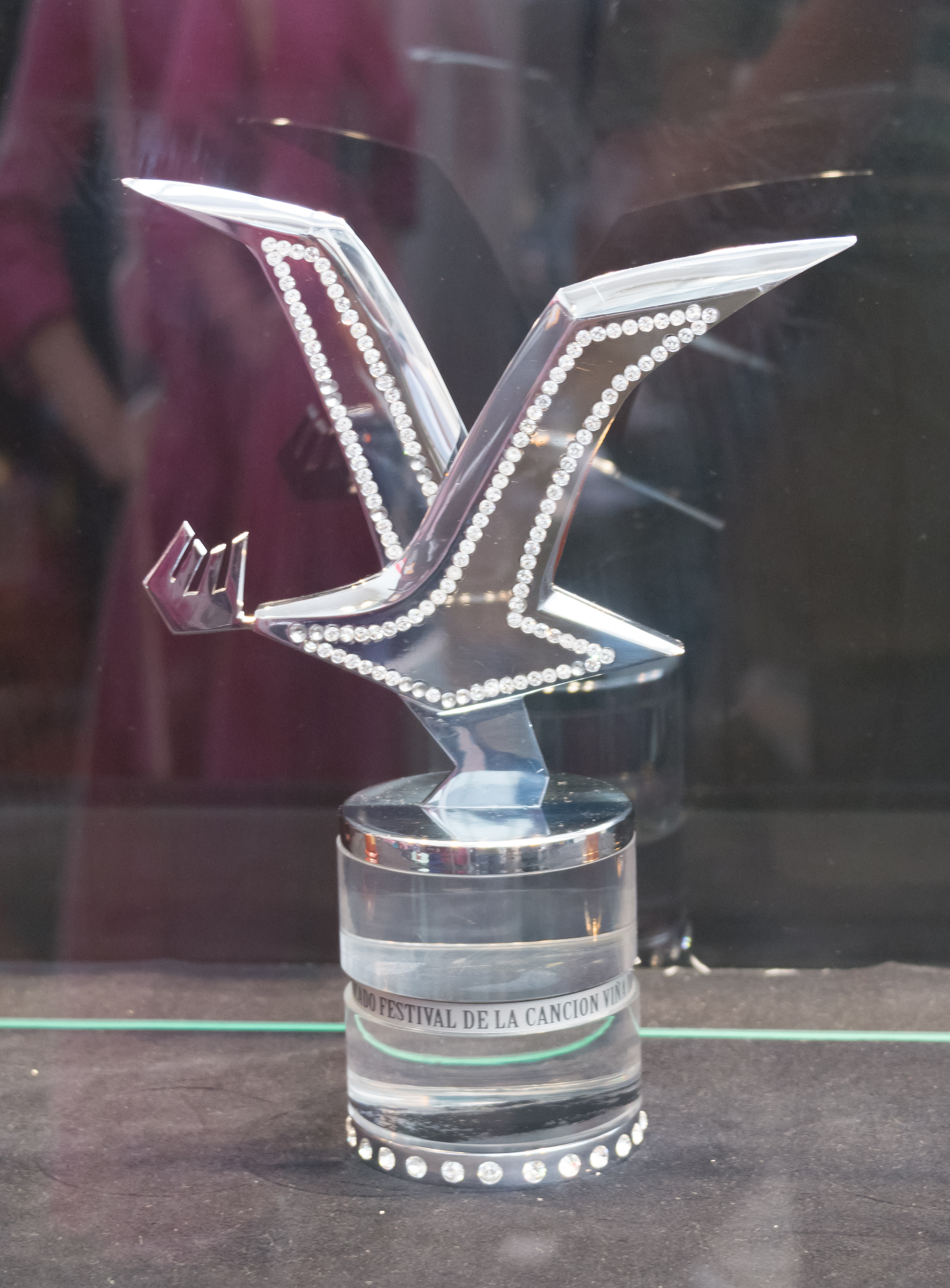
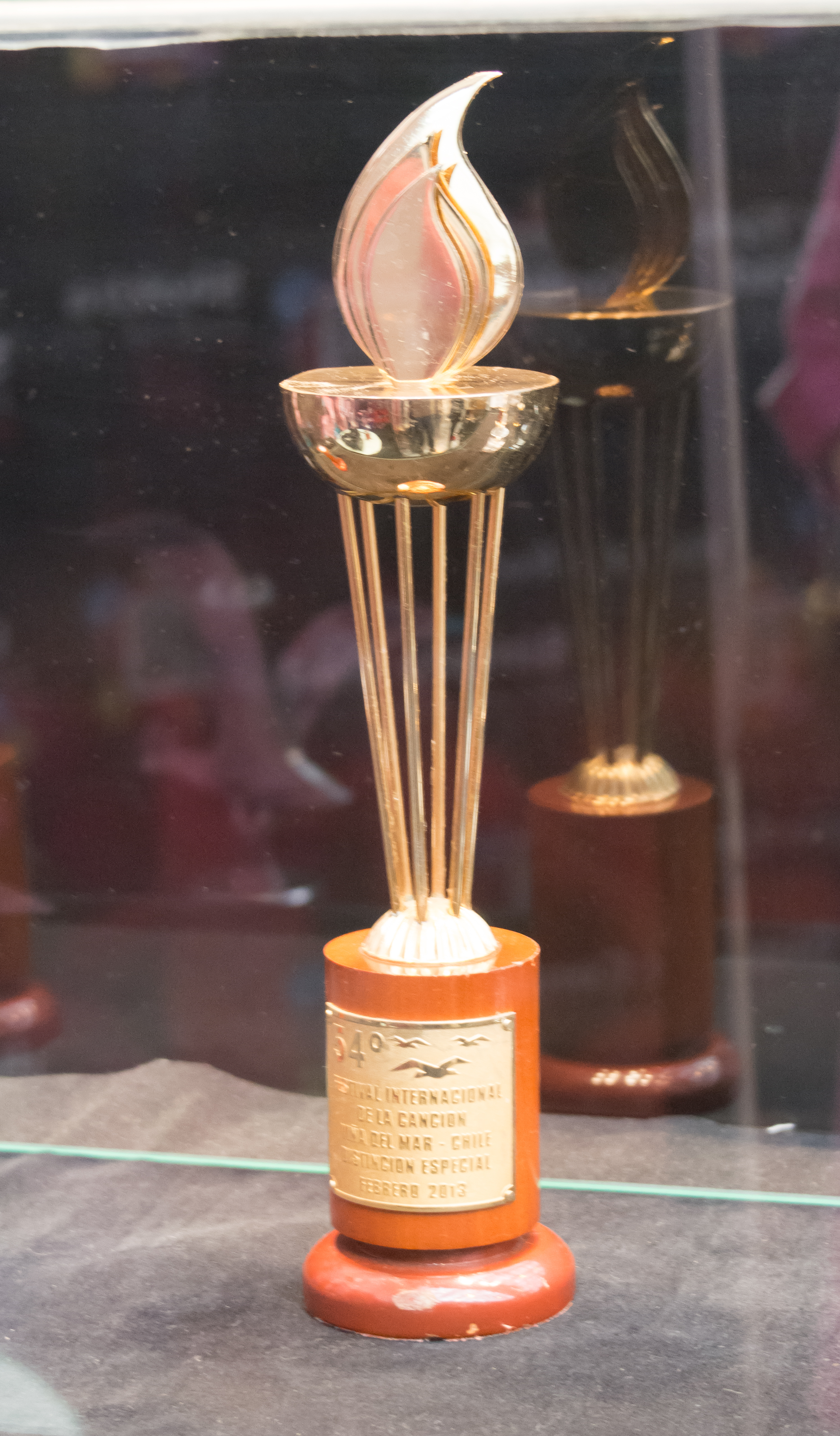
Silver, Golden, Platinum Seagulls and a Golden Torch

Artists perform in the Festival de Viña with the goal of receiving as many awards as possible, which will depend on their success with "El Monstruo." The awards have had multiple changes throughout the festival's history.

The first two awards ever given were the Golden Lyre and Golden Harp in 1961. However, these two awards would be replaced by the Silver and Golden Seagull in 1969.

In 1983, the Festival's commissioners decided to create the Silver and Golden Torch as a "second tier" award. This decision was made in order to add more variety to the awards, and make the Seagull the most prestigious award in the festival.

For over 30 years, no changes were made to the awards. However, in 2015, the production team and Viña's municipality decided to eliminate the Silver and Golden Torch, leaving the Silver and Golden Seagull as the only awards that performers could aspire to get. The reason for this decision was all the critiques that the event was receiving about the high numbers of awards that an artist could receive.

Finally, the Platinum Seagull was added in 2012 as a special award for performers with long influence throughout the festival's history. Only 3 artists have received it up to date.

== Winner songs ==
=== International contest ===
Before 1968, the contest only allowed Chilean composers to participate. In 2000, it featured a selection of the best songs in the festival’s history. In 2009, the contest included former winners from 2001 to 2008. In 2010, it highlighted the most representative songs of the participating countries.

Event		Country	Song title	Songwriter(s)	Artist
I	1960	Chile	"Viña"	José Goles; Manuel Lira	Mario del Monte
II	1961	Chile	"Sin tu amor"	Óscar Olivares; Gilberto Ávila	Los Cuatro Duendes
III	1962	Chile	"Dime por qué"	María Pilar Larraín	Los Cuatro Duendes
IV	1963	Chile	"Tan sólo una mirada"	Juan Vásquez	Marco Aurelio
V	1964	Chile	"Está de más"	Ricardo Jara	Ginette Acevedo
VI	1965	Chile	"Como una ola"	María Angélica Ramírez	Cecilia
VII	1966	Chile	"Por creer en ti"	Marco Aurelio; Jaime Atria	Isabel Adams
VIII	1967	Chile	"Cuando rompa el alba"	Willy Bascuñán	Fresia Soto
IX	1968	Spain	"Palabras"	Jorge Domingo; Enrique Carnicer; Carmen Pons de Carnicer	Luz Eliana
X	1969	Chile	"Mira, mira"	Scottie Scott	Gloria Simonetti
XI	1970	Chile	"Canción a Magdalena"	Julio Zegers	Julio Zegers
XII	1971	Void contest by plagiarism			
XIII	1972	Netherlands	"Julie"	Julio Bernardo Euson	Euson
XIV	1973	Chile	"Los pasajeros"	Julio Zegers	Julio Zegers
XV	1974	Italy	"Immagina"	Giancarlo de Bellis	Annarita Spinaci
XVI	1975	Greece	"Love Song"	H. Ballin; N. Ellineos; Kostas Karagiannopoulos	Elpida
XVII	1976	Chile	"Una noche de amor"	Carlos Baeza	Roberto Viking Valdés
XVIII	1977	Israel	"Canción de amor"	Boaz Sharabi	Nava Baruchin
XIX	1978	Chile	"El tiempo en las bastillas"	Fernando Ubiergo	Fernando Ubiergo
XX	1979	Spain	"A tu regreso a casa"	Braulio	Braulio
XXI	1980	Spain	"Dudando, dudando"	Julio Seijas; Augusto Algueró	Juan Sebastián
XXII	1981	West Germany	"Esperando"	Karl-Heinz Merkel; Cherry Laine	Cherry Laine
XXIII	1982	Chile	"Ausencia"	Juan Carlos Duque	Juan Carlos Duque
XXIV	1983	Uruguay	"Alma, corazón y pan"	Gervasio	Gervasio
XXV	1984	Chile	"Se te olvida"	Héctor Penrós Bañas	Cristóbal
XXVI	1985	Australia	"Ya no puedo más"	K. C. Porter; Chris Turner; Lorenzo Toppano	Lorenzo Toppano
XXVII	1986	Dominican Republic	"Para quererte"	José Antonio Rodríguez; Manuel Tejada	Maridalia Hernández
XXVIII	1987	Italy	"Kiss me"	Antonio de Salvatore; Anna Maria de Salvatore	Desà
XXIX	1988	Italy	"Senza te"	Maurizio Piccoli; Gino Mescoli	Marco Del Freo
XXX	1989	Colombia	"Te propongo"	Fernando Garavito	Edna Rocio
XXXI	1990	Italy	"Non devi abbandonarmi mai"	Angela Tarenzzi	Piero Cotto
XXXII	1991	Chile	"Tira la primera piedra"	Edgardo Riquelme; Sergio Bravo	Javiera Parra and Pedro Foncea
XXXIII	1992	Chile	"Parece tan sencillo"	Juan Carlos Duque	Fernando Casas
XXXIV	1993	Italy	"In questo mondo"	Giuseppe Garibo	Claudio Cirimele
XXXV	1994	Argentina	"Como ayer"	Claudia Brant; Daniel Tarrab	Claudia Brant
XXXVI	1995	Chile	"Si tú te vas"	Cristian Fissore; René Calderón	Jossé
XXXVII	1996	Italy	"Aria Ario"	Paolo Meneguzzi; Dino Melotti; M. Botoni; C. Isgro	Paolo Meneguzzi
XXXVIII	1997	Argentina	"Para vivir un dulce amor"	Víctor Heredia; Carlos Nilson	Carlos Elías
XXXIX	1998	Chile	"Soy tal cual soy"	Álvaro Scaramelli	Álvaro Scaramelli
XL	1999	Colombia	"El aguacero"	Alejandro Gómez Cáceres	Carolina Sabino
XLI	2000	France	"Laisse-moi le Temps" "Let Me Try Again"	M. Jourdan; Caravelli; Paul Anka; Sammy Cahn	Peabo Bryson
XLII	2001	Argentina	"Ayer te vi"	Víctor Heredia	Raly Barrionuevo
XLIII	2002	Argentina	"Soy tu ángel"	Ricardo Pald; Valeria Lynch	Oscar Patiño
XLIV	2003	Spain	"Este amor es tuyo"	Chema Purón	Gisela
XLV	2004	Chile	"Tus ojos"	Alexis Venegas	Alexis Venegas
XLVI	2005	Peru	"Mi alma entre tus manos"	Jessica Sarango; Jorge Pardo; Andrés Landavere	Jorge Pardo
XLVII	2006	Costa Rica	"Dilo de una vez"	Humberto Vargas Valerio	Humberto Vargas Valerio
XLVIII	2007	Spain	"Cuando quieras volver"	Pedro Fernández; Valderrama Díaz	Materia Prima
XLIX	2008	Italy	"La guerra dei trent' anni"	Domenico Protino	Domenico Protino
L	2009	Argentina	"Ayer te vi"	Víctor Heredia	Emiliano Ríos
LI	2010	Italy	"Volare"	Domenico Modugno; Franco Migliacci	Simona Galeandro
LII	2011	Canada	"Try Anything"	Chris Burke-Gaffney; Christopher Ward; Sierra Noble	Sierra Noble
LIII	2012	Italy	"Grazie a te"	Bruno Rubino; Giusseppe di Tella; Denise Faro	Denise Faro
LIV	2013	Iceland	"Because You Can"	Jonas Gladnikoff; Christina Schilling; Camilla Gottschalck; Örlygur Smári; Hera Björk	Hera Björk
LV	2014	Canada	"Hypnotized"	Jeffery Straker	Jeffery Straker
LVI	2015	Italy	"Per fortuna"	Franco Simone	Michele Cortese
LVII	2016	Chile	"Te quiero"	Lucía Covarrubias	Cristián & Lucía
LVIII	2017	Spain	"Dónde estabas tú"	Salvador Beltrán	Salvador Beltrán
LIX	2018	Chile	"Cobarde"	Gabriela Pulgar	Gabriela Pulgar
LX	2019	Peru	"Ya no más"	Susan Ochoa	Susan Ochoa
LXI	2020	Chile	"Chillán"	Vicente Cifuentes	Vicente Cifuentes
LXII	2023	Chile	"Viento"	Yorka	Yorka
LXIII	2024	Mexico	"El Maestro"	Adrián Navarro; Eddy Valenzuela	Eddy Valenzuela
LXIV	2025	Mexico	"Tierra Trágame"	Juan Carlos Corral	Kakalo
LXV	2026	Spain	"Me Prometo"	Antonio José Caballero Molina	Antoñito Molina

Winning countries

- Chile: 24 times (13 times in the International Contest + 9 when the Contest was only national)
- Italy: 10 times
- Spain: 7 times
- Argentina: 5 times
- Mexico: 2 times
- Colombia: twice
- Canada: twice
- Peru: twice
- Germany: once
- Australia: once
- Costa Rica: once
- France: once
- Greece: once
- Israel: once
- Netherlands: once
- Dominican Republic: once
- Uruguay: once
- Iceland: once

=== Folk contest ===
Between 1974 and 1980 this contest was cancelled by the military dictatorship of Augusto Pinochet. Before 2000, the contest only allowed Chilean composers. In 2009, the contest included the former winners between 2001 and 2008.

Event		Country	Song title	Songwriter(s)	Artist
II	1961	Chile	"La consentida"	Jaime Atria	Olga Escobar and Estampas Criollas
III	1962	Chile	"El loro aguafiestas"	Manuel Lira; José Goles	Silvia Infantas and Los Cóndores
IV	1963	Chile	"Álamo huacho"	Clara Solovera	Los Huasos Quincheros
V	1964	Chile	"Qué bonita va"	Francisco Flores del Campo	Los Huasos Quincheros
VI	1965	Chile	"Mano nortina"	Hernán Álvarez	Los Cuatro Cuartos
VII	1966	Chile	"La burrerita"	Sofanor Tobar	Los Paulos
VIII	1967	Chile	"Voy pa' Mendoza"	Willy Bascuñán	Los Solitarios
IX	1968	Chile	"Camanchaca y polvareda"	Ricardo de la Fuente	Los Ponchos Negros
X	1969	Chile	"Cuando tomo la guitarra"	Orlando Muñoz; Alsino Fuentes	Los Alfiles Negros
XI	1970	Chile	"El hombre"	Rolando Alarcón	Rolando Alarcón and Los Emigrantes
XII	1971	Chile	"La torcacita"	Óscar Cáceres; Luis Barragán	Ginette Acevedo
XIII	1972	Chile	"Viejo puente"	Ariel Arancibia; Fernando Pavez	Los Lazos
XIV	1973	Chile	"Mi río"	Julio Numhauser	Charo Cofré
XXII	1981	Chile	"Ay, Fernanda"	Ricardo de la Fuente	Santiago Cuatro
XXIII	1982	Chile	"La tejedora"	Sandra Ramírez	Pedro Messone
XXIV	1983	Chile	"En los tiempos de mi abuelo"	Roberto Rojas; Juan Castillo	Juan Carlos Méndez
XXV	1984	Chile	"Chile, una postal"	Teresa Rodríguez	Los Chacareros de Paine
XXVI	1985	Chile	"La reina del Tamarugal"	Manuel Veas; Luis Miranda	Calichal
XXVII	1986	Chile	"Sube a mi lancha"	Ignacio Millán	Chilote Peñaloza and Los Huillincanos
XXVIII	1987	Chile	"Rapa Nui, mi amor"	Ignacio Millán; María Teresa Díaz	Lorena and Manu Rere
XXIX	1988	Chile	"Camino a Socoroma"	Danny Rodríguez	Los Yanacochas
XXX	1989	Chile	"Maja en Aldachildo"	Ricardo de la Fuente	Ricardo de la Fuente
XXXI	1990	Chile	"No habrá verso que me alcance"	Yayo Castro; Hugo Castillo	Los Surcadores del Viento
XXXII	1991	Chile	"De chingana"	Héctor Molina	Héctor Molina
XXXIII	1992	Chile	"Tejiendo está la manque"	Cecilia González	Leticia and Cantarauco
XXXIV	1993	Chile	"Canto del agua"	Agustín Moncada	Kal
XXXV	1994	Chile	"Mirando pa' la bahía"	José Luis Hernández	José Luis Hernández and Cantamérica
XXXVI	1995	Chile	"María Leonor Lucía"	Magdalena Matthey	Magdalena Matthey
XXXVII	1996	Chile	"Cueca tristona"	Edson Guerrero	Clarita Parra
XXXVIII	1997	Chile	"Cartagena"	Claudio Guzmán	Tito Fernández
XXXIX	1998	Chile	"La noche de Chillán"	Pablo Neruda; Vicente Bianchi	Santiago Cuatro
XL	1999	Chile	"Cueca pulenta"	Víctor Hugo Campusano	Altamar
XLI	2000	Chile	"El corralero"	Sergio Sauvalle	Los Huasos Quincheros
XLII	2001	Chile	"Whipala"	Danny Rodríguez	Danny Rodríguez
XLIII	2002	Peru	"Juramento"	Carlos Rincón	Eduardo del Perú
XLIV	2003	Argentina	"Pintadita"	Fernando Barrientos	Fernando Barrientos
XLV	2004	Argentina	"Bailando con tu sombra (Alelí)"	Víctor Heredia	Abel Pintos
XLVI	2005	Chile	"Cueca al sol"	Isabel Parra	Camila Méndez
XLVII	2006	Chile	"Canción de agua y viento"	Elizabeth Morris	Elizabeth Morris and group
XLVIII	2007	Colombia	"Me duele el alma"	Leonardo Gómez; Diana Hernández	Maria Mulata
XLIX	2008	Peru	"Tusuy Kusun"	Damaris Mallma	Damaris and group
L	2009	Chile	"Cueca al sol"	Isabel Parra	Camila Méndez
LI	2010	Argentina	"El cantar es andar"	César Isella	César Isella
LII	2011	Chile	"De Pascua Lama"	Patricio Manns	Valentina Sepúlveda and Diapazón Porteño
LIII	2012	Chile	"Caprichosa"	Gogo Muñoz; Lucas Saavedra	Mauro Zapata and Fiesta Andina
LIV	2013	Chile	"Con el zapatito, con el zapatón"	Paula Herrera	Paula Herrera
LV	2014	Chile	"La retirada"	La Pájara	Javiera Bobadilla
LVI	2015	Chile	"La mejicana"	Elizabeth Morris	Elizabeth Morris
LVII	2016	Panama	"Viene de Panamá"		Afrodisiaco
LVIII	2017	Chile	"Carnavalito de la esperanza"	Juan Andrés Soko; Francisco Flores	Trifussa
LIX	2018	Chile	"Mundo al revés"	Astrid Veas	Astrid Veas
LX	2019	Argentina	"Justo ahora"	Destino San Javier	Paolo Rogone, Bruno Rogone and Franco Favini
LXI	2020	Argentina	"Avanzar"	Nahuel Pennisi	
LXII	2023	Peru	"Warmisitay"	Milena Warthon	
LXIII	2024	Argentina	"La Luna"	Juan José Vasconcellos	Ahyre
LXIV	2025	Chile	"La baba del sol"	Martín Torres Miranda	Metalengua
LXV	2026	Chile	"Valoración"	Israel Ñuñez	Los 4 Vientos

Winning countries (since 2001, start of International Folk Contest)

- Chile: 13 times (and 33 years of National Folk Contest, between 1961-1973 and 1981–2000)
- Argentina: 6 times
- Peru: 3 times
- Colombia: once
- Panama: once

== Performing Artists ==
Every year international artists are invited to perform at the Festival. In the 2003 edition the Italian singer-songwriter Franco Simone received the "Lifetime Achievement Award" for having strung together thirty years of success in South America with his songs translated into Spanish. Notable directors, such as Fernando Rojas, have led some of the performances.

== Festival Queen ==
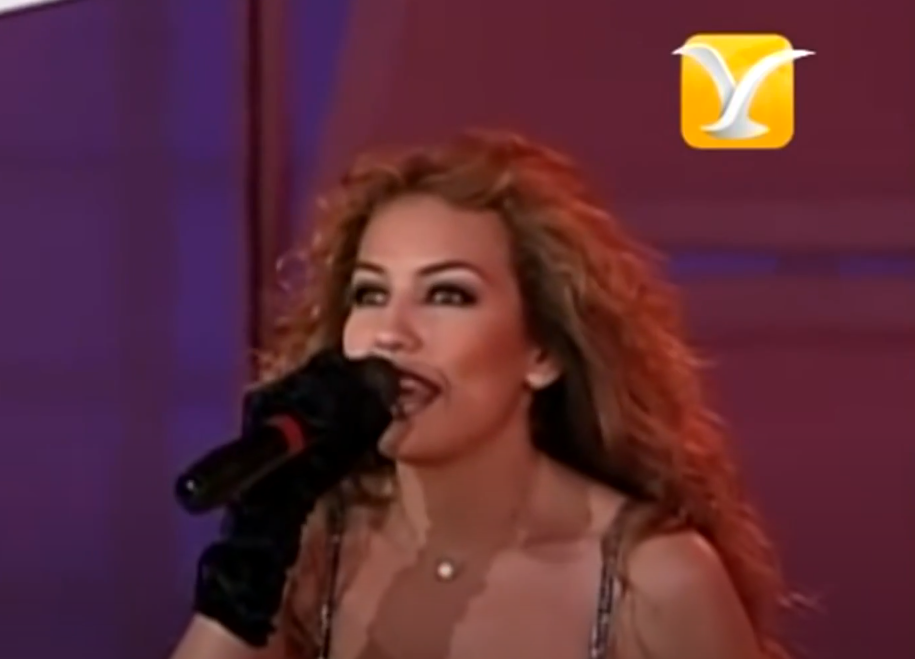
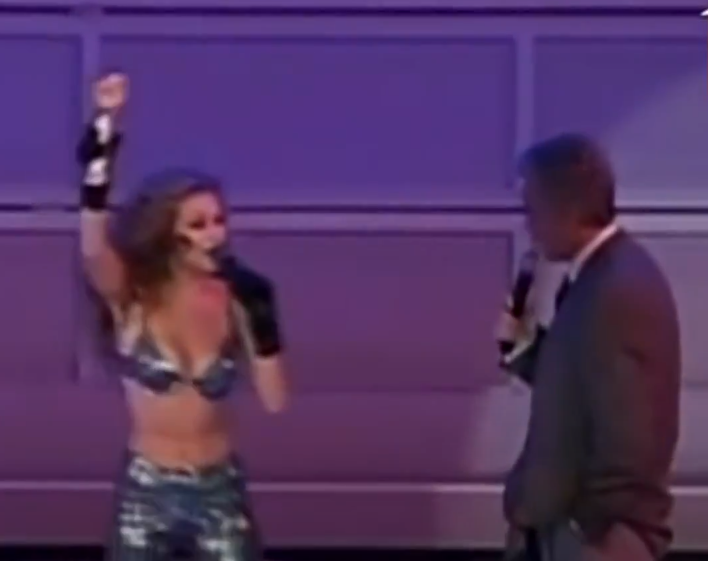
Mexican singer Thalía crowned as Festival Queen of 1997

Every year the festival selected a queen. Popular personalities apply to be queen, often offering outrageous stunts to win.

The queen was chosen by a vote organized by the newspaper La Cuarta. Journalists accredited to the Festival express their preferences through a secret ballot.

The day after the election there is a coronation and the delivery of a band and a ring as a prize by the relevant authorities. Since 2001, on the day of the coronation the Queen of the Festival has to dive into the pool at the Hotel O'Higgins in Viña del Mar in front of the media.

Some of the women chosen as Queen include: Celia Cruz, Diana Bolocco, Thalía, Sigrid Alegría, Yuri, Raffaella Carrà, Tonka Tomicic, and Gloria Trevi.

In February 2023, the definitive elimination of the Reina de Viña was announced (assuming the election of the Rey would never take place), before the refusal of the municipality headed by the mayor Macarena Ripamonti, due to the «stigmatization of the woman» and the farandulización of the event. In this way, the Reyes de Viña will be replaced by the «Festival Ambassadors», which will be elected by the general public and the press accredited in the place, in addition to having the purpose of returning to the tradition of awarding the official artists of the Festival and generate awareness about issues that contribute to society.

=== List of Queens ===
Year	Queen	Country	TV Channel	Notes
2020	Rosita Piulats	Chile	TVN	
2019	Chantal Gayoso	Chile	TVN	
2018	Betsy Camino	Cuba	Canal 13	
2017	Kika Silva	Chile	Canal 13	
2016	Nicole "Luli" Moreno	Chile	Canal 13	
2015	Jhendelyn Nuñez	Chile	Canal 13	Known for participating in Vedette shows.
2014	Sigrid Alegría	Chile	Canal 13	Film and TV actress
2013	Dominique Gallego	Chile	Canal 13	Star on numerous reality shows
2012	Valeria Ortega	Chile	Canal 13	Journalist.
2011	Andrea Dellacasa	Argentina	Canal 13	Vedette.
2010	Carolina Arregui	Chile	Canal 13	Actress in TV Series, 2010 festival juror
2009	Catherine Fulop	Venezuela	Canal 13	Actress in TV Series, 2009 festival juror
2008	Pilar Ruiz	Colombia		Reality show participant
2007	Diana Bolocco	Chile	Canal 13	Journalist, Cecilia Bolocco's Sister, TV show host.
2006	Tonka Tomicic	Chile	TVN	Miss World Chile 1995
2005	Luciana Salazar	Argentina	Chilevisión	Showbiz Queen from Argentina
2004	Carolina "Pampita" Ardohain	Argentina		Benjamín Vicuña's wife.
2003	María Eugenia Larraín	Chile	Canal 13	Showbiz Queen from Chile.
2002	Patricia Manterola	Mexico		Artist invited to the festival that year, crowned for the second time.
2001	Natalia Oreiro	Uruguay		Artist invited
2000	Celia Cruz	Cuba; United States		Invited the same year, as part of the festival show.
1999	Carla Perez	Brazil		Dancer of É o Tchan ! as invited artist.
1998	Sofía Franco	Peru		Presenter
1997	Thalía	Mexico		Invited artist
1996	Paola Falcone	Chile		Miss Chile 1995
1995	Patricia Manterola	Mexico		Artist invited
1994	Sofía Vergara	Colombia		Presenter
1993	Gloria Trevi	Mexico		Artist invited
1992	Lucero	Mexico		Had a romance with Felipe Camiroaga
1991	Yuri	Mexico		Invited artist
1990	Xuxa	Brazil		Invited artist
1989	Myriam Hernández	Chile		Invited artist
1988	Marcela "Mache" Sánchez	Peru		
1987	Irene Llano	Chile		Invited artist
1986	Cindy Valentine	Canada		Participated in the "competencia internacional"
1985	María Conchita Alonso	Venezuela		Invited artist
1984	Gianina Matei	Romania		Participated in "competencia internacional"
1983	Lucía Méndez (Note: Unofficial election)	Mexico		Formed part of the festival judging panel
1982	Raffaella Carrà	Italy		Invited artist
1979	María Graciela Gómez	Chile		Presenter

Notas

=== Queens per country ===
Country	#	Year
Chile	16	1979, 1987, 1989, 1996, 2003, 2006, 2007, 2010, 2012, 2013, 2014, 2015, 2016, 2017, 2019, 2020
Mexico	7	1983, 1991, 1992, 1993, 1995, 1997, 2002
Argentina	3	2004, 2005, 2011
Venezuela	2	1985, 2009
Colombia	2	1994, 2008
Brazil	2	1990, 1999
Peru	2	1988, 1998
Uruguay	1	2001
Cuba	2	2000, 2018
Canada	1	1986
Romania	1	1984
Italy	1	1982

== See also ==
- List of historic rock festivals
