= Paolo Meneguzzi =

Swiss Italian singer (born 1976)

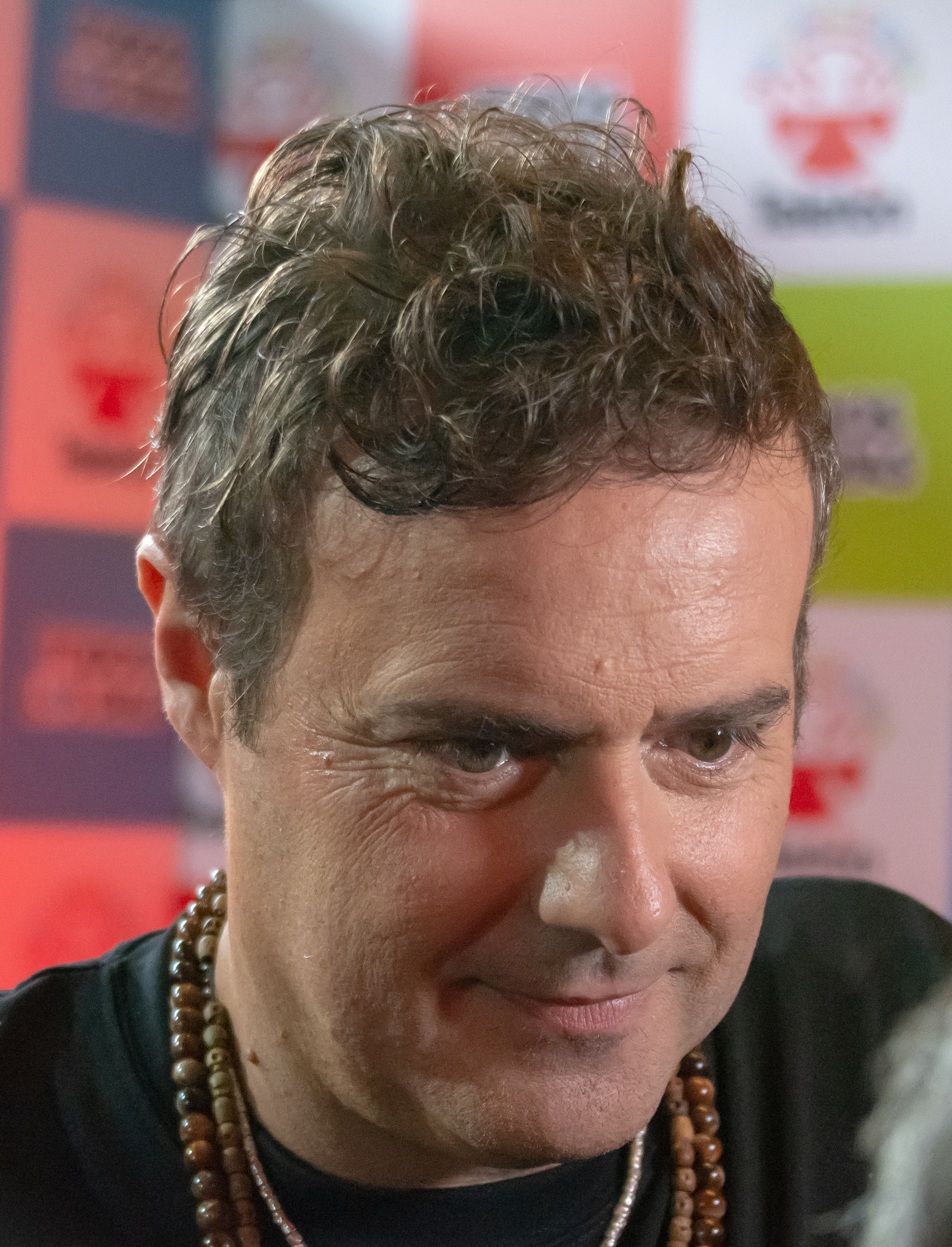
- Meneguzzi in 2023

Background information
- Born: Pablo Meneguzzo; 6 December 1976 (age 49); Stabio, Canton of Ticino, Switzerland
- Genres: Pop
- Occupation: Singer-songwriter
- Instrument: Vocals
- Years active: 1997–present
- Labels: Warner Music Group; BMG International; Sony BMG Music Entertainment; Around The Music; Sony Music

Paolo Meneguzzi (born 6 December 1976, as Pablo Meneguzzo) is a Swiss Italian singer. He is the son of Loredana Pacchiani and Gomez Meneguzzo.

== Biography ==
In 1996, while the name Paolo Meneguzzi was still unknown in Italy, Paolo won the Viña del Mar International Song Festival, held in Chile with the song "Aria, Ariò". The success of the song prompted the release of his debut album Por Amor on 27 March 1997. Paolo continued to build his career with the release of another album, self-titled, which contained the single, "Si enamorarse".

Paolo Meneguzzi's Italian debut occurred with his participation in the Young Artists section at the Sanremo Music Festival in 2001. His song "Ed io non ci sto più" earned him seventh place.

That same year, the album Un sogno nelle mani was released.

He released a new single in 2002, "In nome dell'amore". In 2003, he released the single "Verofalso", and the album Lei è, released in October that year, went gold (with 50,000 copies sold), and then double platinum (200,000 copies sold).

In 2004, he released the single "Guardami negli occhi (prego)", which reached fourth place with 127,346 votes at Sanremo, and the new edition of Lei è was released, containing an additional song, Baciami, and the remixes of "Lei è" and "Verofalso", in addition to the song from Sanremo.

In June 2004, the 'Lei è' tour from Bellinzona (CH) began, his first tour, that travelled throughout Italy and Switzerland and was more successful among young people than among small children.

In 2005, he once again participated in the Festival di Sanremo with the song "Non capiva che l'amavo". In the same week, the album Favola is released and after two weeks as a single, went platinum, selling over 200,000 copies.

After having spent the summer of 2005 between Italy and Switzerland with the 'Favola' tour, Meneguzzi dedicated himself to the creation of a new album. After two years of silence, he announced his participation in the Festival di Sanremo and of the release (on 9 March) of the album Musica.

He participated in the Festival di Sanremo 2007, with the song "Musica", placing sixth, having gained much success and above all, the approval of Pippo Baudo, who defined him as "The Exemplar of the Festival di Sanremo".

Musica was released on 9 March 2007, Paolo's fourth Italian album, following the release of the namesake single that remains the most sold in Italy.

On 21 April he began the 'Musica Tour', still in Switzerland, but this time departing from Biasca. On 2 November, the fan club gathering with the artist took place in the studios of Radio Italia in Cologno Monzese.

On 26 November 2007, it was announced that Meneguzzi would be representing his home country Switzerland in the Eurovision Song Contest 2008 in Belgrade, Serbia, competing with the pop ballad "Era stupendo". He took part in the second semi-final of the contest on Thursday 22 May 2008, competing against 18 other countries, all competing for one of 10 spots in the final on Saturday 24. However, he failed to qualify to the final.

He participated in the Sanremo Music Festival 2008, performing the song "Grande" and placing sixth. The song was included in his fifth album, titled Corro via. Released on 14 March 2008, it also features the single "Era stupendo".

Meneguzzi is the founder of "Progettoamore" (Love Project). Progettoamore is a charity founded in 2009, to support and help children and adolescents.

== Discography ==
=== Italian and Swiss markets ===
Title	Year	Peak positions		Notes
Title	Year	ITA	SWI	Notes
Un sogno nelle mani	2001	–	–	
Lei è	2003	–	–	
Lei è (New edition)	2004	15	–	Peaked in FRA: #151
Favola	2005	5	34	
Musica	2007	8	27	
Corro via	2008	8	11	
Miami	2010	13	38	
Best of: Sei amore	2011	18	65	Compilation album
Zero	2013	–	–	

=== International studio albums ===
- 1997: Por Amor
- 1998: Paolo
- 1999: Emociones
- 2001: Un sueño entre las manos
- 2006: Ella Es
- 2007: Musica
- 2008: Corro Via
- 2010: Miami
- 2011: Best Of: Sei Amore

=== Spanish / Latin American market albums ===
- 1996: Por amor
- 1997: Paolo
- 1997: Solo para ti
- 1999: Emociones
- 2001: Un sueño entre las manos
- 2005: Ella es
- 2007: Música [Spanish Edition]
- 2012: Mi misión

=== French market albums ===
- 2004: Elle est

=== Live / DVDs ===
Title	Year	Peak positions		Notes
Title	Year	ITA	SWI	Notes
Live Musica Tour	2007	71	–	

=== Singles ===
Title	Year	Peak positions			Album
Title	Year	ITA	SWI	FRA	Album
"Il nome dell'amore" (with Ophélie Cassy)	2002	33	25	10	Lei è
"Vero / Falso"	2003	9	–	–	Lei è
"Guardami negli occhi (Prego)"	2004	3	–	–	Lei è
"Baciami"	2004	11	–	–	Lei è
"Non capiva che l'amavo"	2005	7	72	–	Favola
"Sara"	2005	10	–	–	Favola
"Musica"	2007	1	–	–	Musica
"Era stupendo"	2008	–	11	–	Eurovision Song Contest - Belgrade 2008 / Corro via

Participation in Sanremo Music Festival

- 2001: "Ed io non ci sto più" (R. Zappy) – 7th place
- 2004: "Guardami negli occhi" (P. Meneguzzi, Rosario Di Bella, L. Mattoni, D. Melotti) – 4th place
- 2005: "Non capiva che l'amavo" (P. Meneguzzi, Rosario Di Bella, D. Melotti) – non-finalist
- 2007: "Musica" (P. Meneguzzi, D. Melotti, Rosario Di Bella) – 6th place
- 2008: "Grande" (Gatto Panceri) – 6th place

Other releases (Italian)

- 1996: "Arià Ariò"
- 1996: "Sei la fine del mondo"
- 2001: "Mi sei mancata"
- 2001: "Quel ti amo maledetto"
- 2002: "Il nome dell'amore" (solo)
- 2003: "Lei è"
- 2004: "Una regola d'amore"
- 2005: "Lui e Lei"
- 2007: "Musica" (feat. Nate James)
- 2007: "Ti amo ti odio"
- 2007: "Ho bisogno d'amore"
- 2008: "Tú eres música" ("Musica" Spanish version)
- 2010: "Imprevedibile"
- 2010: "Se per te"
- 2011: "Sei amore"
- 2011: "Mi missión"

Releases (French)

- 2004: "Au nom de l'amour" (with Ophélie Cassy) (French version of "Il nome dell'amore")
- 2004: "Prends mon corps et ma vie"

Releases (Spanish)

- 1996: "Aria' ario'"
- 1996: "La primera vez"
- 1996: "Loco loco"
- 1996: "Eres el fin del mundo"
- 1996: "Golpes bajos"
- 1997: "Si enamorarse"
- 1998: "Por una como tú"
- 1998: "Aire de fiesta"
- 1999: "Mi libre canción"
- 1999: "Sabor de sal"
- 2001: "Y yo no aguanto más"
- 2001: "Un condenado te amo"
- 2001: "Tú me faltabas"
- 2005: "Ella es"
- 2005: "Mírame a los ojos"
- 2005: "Bésame"
- 2008: "Tú eres música"
- 2009: "Te amo te odio"
- 2012: "Mi misión"
- 2016: "Dedicada a ti"
- 2016: "Verano"

Preceded by DJ BoBo with "Vampires Are Alive"	Switzerland in the Eurovision Song Contest; 2008	Succeeded by Lovebugs with "The Highest Heights"
