= 1991 Chilean telethon =

Charity event

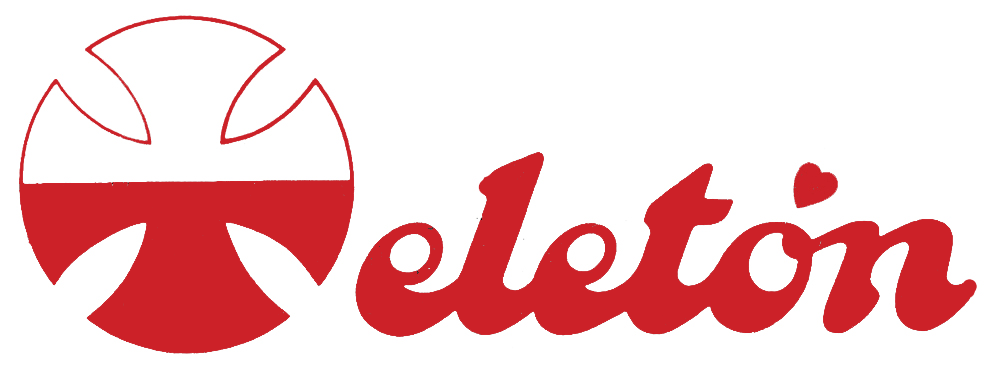
Chilean Telethon's logo

The 1991 Chilean telethon was the tenth version of the solidarity campaign conducted in Chile, which took place on 29 and 30 November 1991. The theme of this version was "Thanks to You", as a way of thanks to the Chilean public who had participated in the campaign for 13 years.

It was the last edition of the Chilean telethon, that was identified with a cardinal number as from the next edition it began to be identified as Teletón and the year of the broadcast.

The final total on the night, released by the Banco de Chile and read by Javier Miranda (TV host) was CL$ 1,584,289,345. The final collection of the telethon was CL$ 1,803,923,485. The poster girl was Angela Castro.

== Sponsors ==
Agua Mineral Cachantún; Banco de Chile; Cecinas Winter; Combustibles Copec; Detergente Ace; Fanta; Galletas Soda Costa; Golpe de Dos en Uno; Helados Savory	Jabón Moncler; Johnson's Clothes; Juguetes Otto Kraus; Leche Soprole; Odontine; Panadol; Papel Higiénico Confort; Pastas Lucchetti; Pilsener Dorada	Pisco Control; Quesos Colún; Refrescos Yupi; Ripley; Shampoo Dimensión; Super Pollo; Té Supremo; Yoghurt Soprole

== Artists ==
=== National singers ===
- (Chile) Myriam Hernández
- (Chile) Luis Jara
- (Chile) Gloria Simonetti
- (Chile) Héctor Galaz
- (Chile) Giolito y Su Combo
- (Chile) José Luis Arce
- (Chile) La Sonora de Tommy Rey
- (Chile) Síndrome
- (Chile) Se Busca
- (Chile) Los Clásicos
- (Chile) Zalo Reyes
- (Chile) Soledad Guerrero
- (Chile) Fernando Ubiergo
- (Chile) Sonora Palacios
- (Chile) Inti-Illimani
- (Chile) Cecilia Echeñique
- (Chile) Los Huasos Quincheros
- (Chile) Lorena
- (Chile) Congreso
- (Chile) Miguelo
- (Chile) Ximena Reyes
- (Chile) Eduardo Valenzuela
- (Chile) Hola Hola
- (Chile) Rodolfo Navech
- (Chile) Tito Fernández
- (Chile) Nicole
- (Chile) Mónica De Calixto
- (Chile) Illapu
- (Chile) Álvaro Scaramelli
- (Chile) Guillermo Fernández
- (Chile) Juan Antonio Labra
- (Chile) (Italy) Andrea Tessa
- (Chile) Sexual Democracia
- (Chile) De Kiruza
- (Chile) La Ley

=== International Artists ===
- (Puerto Rico) Nydia Caro
- (Mexico) Lucero
- (Dominican Republic) Víctor Víctor
- (Spain) Sergio Dalma
- (Italy) Franco Simone
- (Puerto Rico) Ednita Nazario
- (Spain) Braulio
- (Argentina) Alejandro Lerner
- (Spain) Tam Tam Go
- (Honduras) Banda Blanca
- (Dominican Republic) Ángela Carrasco

=== Comedians ===
- Checho Hirane
- Coco Legrand
- Ricardo Meruane
- Carlos Helo
- Pepe Tapia
- Lucho Arenas

=== Magazine ===
- Raul Di Blasio (piano)
- Bafona (folklore Deputies)
- Alexandra and her ballet
- Julio Zúñiga's dance group (disabled people)

=== In the Children's Section ===
- Pipiripao
- La Pintita
- Enza's Show
- Mini Pop
- El Profesor Rossa
- Cachureos

== Transmission ==
- La Red
- UCV Televisión
- Televisión Nacional de Chile
- Megavisión
- RTU University of Chile TV Networks
- Universidad Católica de Chile Televisión
- Telenorte
- Canal 8 UCV Televisión
- TV Cable Intercom

This was La Red's first telethon as participating network, and was Megavision's second under its present name.
