= Galpón Víctor Jara =

Coordinates: 33°26′28″S 70°39′58″W

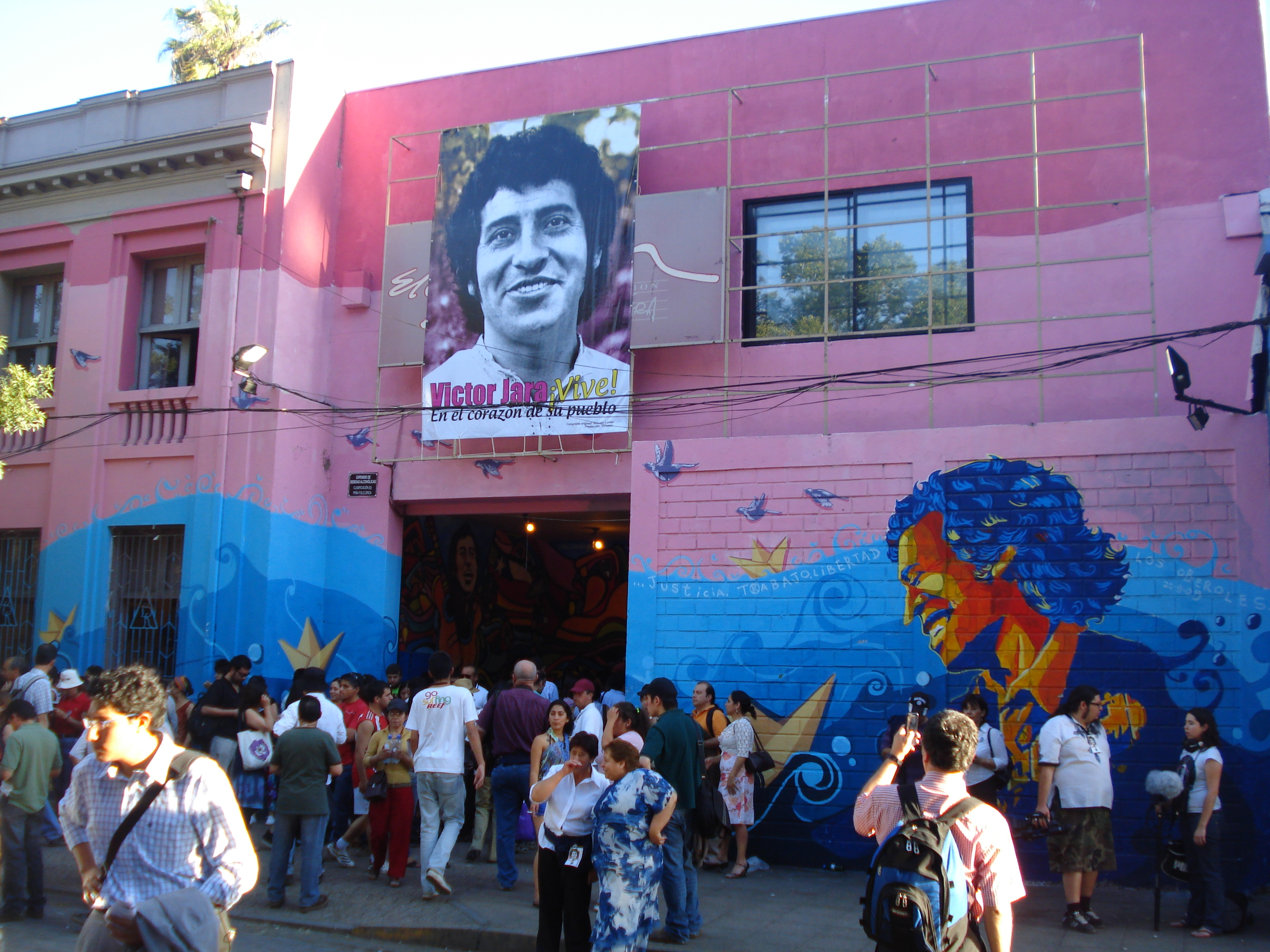
- Interactive map of Galpón Víctor Jara
- Address: Huérfanos 2146, Barrio Brasil
- Location: Santiago, Chile
- Type: Performing arts center
- Events: New Chilean Cumbia, Cueca

Construction
- Opened: 2003

Website
- http://www.galponvictorjara.cl/; www.fundacionvictorjara.org

Galpón Víctor Jara ("Víctor Jara Warehouse") is a cultural center located in Santiago, Chile, in Barrio Brasil, an area of the city known for its strong artistic and cultural scene. Managed by the Víctor Jara Foundation, the center is named for the Chilean singer-songwriter and activist who was killed by the Chilean army following the Chilean coup of 11 September 1973. The Galpón is a popular live venue for Chilean bands, particularly those of the New Chilean Cumbia, gypsy and cueca musical styles, such as Chico Trujillo, Banda Conmoción and La Mano Ajena.

== History ==
Following the return to democracy in Chile in 1990, efforts to achieve justice and recognition for Víctor Jara slowly gained momentum. In the early 2000s, the Víctor Jara Foundation campaigned to convert the Víctor Jara Stadium, where Jara was tortured and killed (the stadium, originally called Estadio Chile, was renamed to commemorate Jara in 2004), into a cultural center, but encountered difficulties from local authorities. A solution was found in the space occupied by the Foundation itself, in Plaza Brasil, the heart of Barrio Brasil, a cultural hub in the western part of Santiago. Galpón Víctor Jara opened there in 2003. Joan Jara, the Foundation's founder and Jara's widow, said at the time that "we want to be a meeting place for all kinds of artists: Chilean, foreign and those alternative artists who don't fit in anywhere else."

In 2009, a large public funeral for Víctor Jara was held at the Galpón, with thousands of mourners gathering to honor the singer. Jara's remains had been exhumed as part of investigations into his death. The casket was carried on a procession through the streets of Santiago and re-buried in the General Cemetery.

The Galpón has been forced to close on a number of occasions. In 2010, the then mayor of Santiago, Pablo Zalaquett, closed the center because it did “not comply with the infrastructure required of a venue holding events of such a nature.” It was reopened shortly after, once the application for a new permit was in process. The venue has also been closed on a few occasions due to complaints about loud noise. This occurred most recently in September 2012, just prior to celebrations for the 80th anniversary of Jara’s birth, and calling a halt to the planned Cumbre Internacional de la Cumbia event (“International Cumbia Summit”). The center was reopened a couple of weeks later with a temporary permit, and Joan Jara remarked that “This has been such a long process. At least there exists the possibility that we can continue to develop this work, which I believe is very important for Chilean artists,” in 2013, it was closed because "it has never obtained a definitive building permit or a final resolution from the municipality of Santiago."
