= Juana Fe =

Chilean musical band

- Origin: Santiago, Chile
- Genres: Cumbia, ska, salsa, timba, samba
- Years active: 2004 - present
- Members: Pablo Moraga (vocals); Rodrigo Rojas (piano); Gonzalo "Diablo" Ibáñez (guitar); Jaime Concha (bass); Pablo Vargas (conga drums); Tomás "palitroque" Muhr (percussion); Francisco "Pancho" Craddock (drums)
- Past members: Juan Ayala (vocals)
- Website: juanafe.cl

Juana Fe is a Chilean musical band that mixes popular Latin American rhythms such as salsa and cumbia with Jamaican ska. Alongside other New Chilean Cumbia bands such as La Mano Ajena, Tizana and Chico Trujillo, they form part of the new wave of Latin American fusion that became popular in the first decade of the 21st century. Juana Fe’s music is influenced by urban life and the political and social environment in Chile.

== History ==
Juana Fe was formed in 2004 when fellow university students Juan Ayala, Jaime Concha and Gonzalo Ibáñez decided to dedicate themselves completely to music, living communally in a house in Barrio Brasil, and paying rent by selling soy hamburgers on the university circuit. They were soon joined by percussionists and Rodrigo Rojas on keyboards. Juana Fe began to improvise with popular rhythms, creating what they themselves termed the Afrorumba chilenera (Chilean Afro-rumba), and performing in the peripheral neighbourhoods of the Chilean capital. That same year, Juana Fe obtained a grant from the National Arts Development Fund (Fondo Nacional de Desarrollo Cultural de las Artes, FONDART) which they used to record their first album, Con los pies en el barrio (“With your feet in the ‘hood”). In 2007 they launched the album Afrorumba chilenera, featuring the hit song Callejero, which led them to perform at two of the most important concerts in Chile: the Olmué Huaso Festival and the Viña del Mar International Song Festival. Juana Fe's latest album, La Makinita (2010), incorporates more diverse influences such as hip hop and salsa, and lyrics offering social commentary.

Juana Fe has toured Europe, performing at 30 events and participating in 15 festivals, including the Glastonbury music festival in 2011.

The band has also performed throughout Latin America and within their native Chile, offering a large number of free concerts.

== Discography ==
=== Con los pies en el barrio (2004, FONDART) ===
1. Barrio viejo
2. Loco pato
3. Peligro
4. La calavera amarilla
5. Digame lo que va a pasar
6. Pa que no se olvide
7. La esquina de la desgracia
8. Juan
9. El alma de mis muertos
10. Savia nueva

=== Afrorumba chilenera (2007, Sello Azul) ===
1. Callejero
2. ChinChin
3. Afrorumbachilenera
4. El Volcán
5. El que te quiere te quiere
6. La Teleraña
7. La Dormida
8. Los Tambores
9. Andrea
10. Chilian suin

=== La makinita (2010) ===
1. La makinita
2. Del fin del mundo
3. Tengo luquita
4. Yankee man
5. No era Cecilia
6. La bala
7. Bombo y guitarra
8. Un papel es un papel
9. Masari Chin chin
10. Chiquitita
11. Click click
12. Venga mi vida
13. La jardinera
14. Zig zag
15. Bajando por el zig zag

=== Maleducao (2016) ===
1. A quemar el sol
2. Enloqueciendo
3. Maleducao
4. Cimarrón
5. Una Volada
6. Sirena
7. La flor del desierto
8. Cualquiera puede bailar
9. Tráiganme la medicina

== See also ==
- New Chilean Cumbia
