= Combo Ginebra =

Chilean musical ensemble

- Origin: Santiago, Chile
- Genres: New cumbia, rock, gypsy music
- Years active: 2004–present
- Website: www.comboginebra.cl

Combo Ginebra is a Chilean musical ensemble of the New Chilean Cumbia style. The band emerged in 2004 as a traditional gypsy music duo featuring Álvaro Pacheco and Juan Pablo Cabello. The duo soon began incorporating cumbia rhythms into their repertoire and were joined by other instrumentalists to form a cumbia ensemble band.

Combo Ginebra is currently one of the mainstays of Santiago’s cumbia music scene and they regularly perform to lively crowds at venues such as the Galpón Víctor Jara (Victor Jara “Warehouse”) and the Fonda Permanente.

== History ==
The band originally formed in 2004 as a traditional gypsy music project featuring Álvaro “Pachuko” Pacheco on the violin and Juan Pablo “Gipsy” Cabello on guitar. Using the same instruments, the duo began to incorporate cumbia into their sound, attracting more musicians to the ensemble.

By 2006, Combo Ginebra exclusively dedicated themselves to the cumbia. Their song Pasto Seco was included in a Chilean cumbia compilation, Santiago caliente, in 2008, compiled by Aldo “Macha” Asenjo of the band Chico Trujillo. Combo Ginebra released their first album, Cumbias de Sangre y Oro (“Cumbias of Blood and Gold”) independently in 2009. Their second album, El Vacilón, was released in mid-2012 through the Oveja Negra label.

== Musical style and influence ==
A mainstay of the New Chilean Cumbia musical scene, Combo Ginebra’s musical style blends lively cumbia rhythms with emotive, theatrical and at times humorous lyrics and a touch of social commentary.

The band’s 2012 album El Vacilón - a Spanish term meaning “great party” - incorporates Latin rhythms such as the salsa and Peruvian cumbia, with diverse influences including flamenco, gypsy music and punk rock. Band member Cristián Jara has described the album as an invitation for “ladies, children, everyone, to dance. It should be about people wanting to have a good time, because we don’t party alone, we need the people to be a part of this vacilón.”

The band has also been quoted as saying “people love the cumbia these days because it was maintained for a long time. It’s a part of our culture and the best thing that can happen is for it to keep being played everywhere.”

== Discography ==
=== Albums ===
- 2009 - Cumbias de Sangre y Oro (self-produced)
- 2012 - El Vacilón (Oveja Negra)
