= Banda Conmoción =

Chilean ensemble band

- Origin: Villa Alemana, Valparaíso, Chile
- Genres: Cumbia, cumbia andina, fusion latinoamericana
- Years active: 2001–present
- Label: Oveja Negra
- Members: Ítalo Love Osses (trompeta) Pablo Carreño (trompeta); Pablo Sapito Morales (trompeta); Daniel Doko Trincado (trompeta); Carlitos Flores (clarinete); Leo Fecci (saxo alto); Herbert Kendall (saxo tenor); David Naranjo (trombón); Paulette Buera (trombón); Rafael Gamboa (trombón bajo); Germán Todhes (trombón bajo); Diego Flores (tuba); Daniel Flores (acordeón); Jorge Nuñez (caja y timbaleta); Juan Martinez(platillos, conga, tambora y tumbadora); Jerónimo Carrasco(Bombo, bongó, chinchin); Pablo Villablanca (platillos); Carolina Apablaza (Danza, platillos); Jessica González (Danza, platillos) Eduardo Irrazábal (actor/figurín diablo)

Banda Conmoción are a Chilean ensemble band who mix cumbia and gypsy music with genres such as ska and cha-cha-cha. They are part of the new Latin-American fusion movement and emerged in the early nineties along with groups like Chico Trujillo and La Floripondio. They are also considered part of the New Chilean Cumbia movement.

== Early years ==
The band's first incarnation was as part of a theater troupe called Mendicantes in 1997. Four years later, in 2001, they established themselves as a separate band, though they continued to collaborate with the theater group until 2005.

From 2005 onwards, they cut ties with Mendicantes and began to perform alone. Their performances were never on conventional stages: they performed in public spaces such as plazas, street corners, weddings or parties. As they became better known, they started to take on bigger stages such as the Galpon Victor Jara (Victor Jara "Warehouse"), a magnet for independent musicians in Santiago's Barrio Brasil neighborhood. Their repertoire has included genres as diverse as cumbia, Andean music, ska, cha cha cha, porro, waltz, bolero, and gypsy music, among others, which combine to produce a unique sound.

== Albums ==
In 2008, Banda Conmoción released their first album, Pregonero, an early Latin American and Spanish name for a town crier. Pregonero pulled together all the original tracks created by the band in the seven years since their formation in 2001.

The ensemble performing Pregonero includes woodwind, four trumpets, two saxes, clarinet, trombone, tuba, bombo, drums and cymbals. According to Chilean national newspaper El Mercurio, "it's a true commotion: everything is battered and blown. Nothing is plugged in. And nothing is sung [except] con este cha cha chá or suavecito, mami".

The band's second album, Cuerpo Repartido ("shared" or "divided" body) was released in 2010. The title refers to Túpac Katari, a Bolivian leader in the indigenous rebellion against the Spanish Empire in the early 1780s, who was executed and quartered as a warning to other rebels.

Cuerpo Repartido introduced new sounds to the band's repertoire, drawn from international tours to Spain, France, Germany and Shanghai and including new melodies, piano and references to Violeta Parra. El Mercurio described one track, Maldigo del Alto Cielo, as "Violeta Parra multiplied by carnival."

Banda Conmoción are part of the line-up for the third edition of Lollapalooza Chile, taking place in Santiago in April 2013.

== Members ==
- Bárbara López (trumpet)
- Ximena López (trumpet)
- Ítalo Love Osses (trumpet)
- Pablo Sapito Morales (trumpet)
- Daniel Doko Trincado (trumpet)
- Carlitos Flores (clarinet)
- Leo Fecci (alto sax)
- Pape Maikol Barría (tenor sax)
- Felipe González (trombone)
- Róbinson San Martín (bass trombone)
- Germán Todes (bass trombone)
- Héctor Echeverría (trombone and tuba)
- Daniel Flores (accordion)
- Álex Muñoz (timbales)
- Jorge Ganem (conga and tambora)
- Jeka González (cymbals)
- Pablo Villablanca (cymbals)
- Eduardo Irrazábal (actor/devil character)
- Cristian Hueo Sanhueza (bombo, vocals and direction)

== Discography ==
- Pregonero (2008)
- Cuerpo Repartido (2010)
- Sonido Esencial, 10 Años (2013, Live album)
- Tiraneño (2014)
- Festejos (2017)
- Infierno Carnaval (2023)
