= Virginio Arias =

Chilean sculptor and educator (1855–1941)

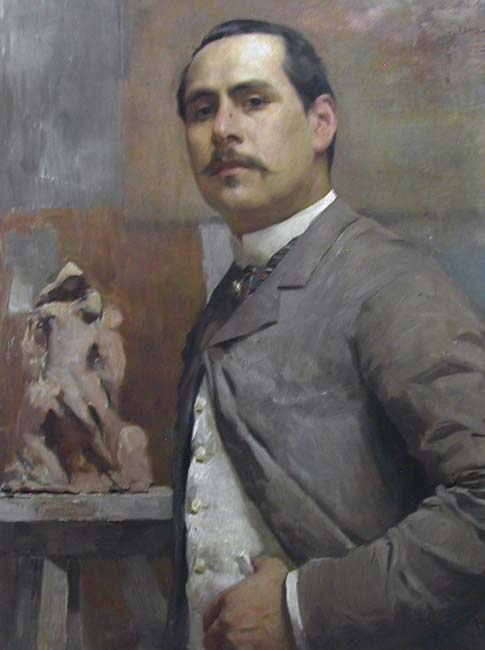
- Arias painted by Arturo Michelena, 1888
- Born: 8 December 1855; Ránquil, Chile
- Died: 17 January 1941 (aged 85); Santiago, Chile
- Education: Beaux-Arts de Paris
- Occupations: Sculptor; educator

Virginio Arias Cruz (8 December 1855, Ránquil, Chile – 17 January 1941, Santiago, Chile) was a Chilean sculptor and educator, who served as the director of the Academy of Painting from 1900 to 1911.

== Life and work ==
He was born to a humble family, and originally worked in the fields. His artistic education began in Concepción, at the age of twelve, when he took lessons from a sculptor named Tomás Chávez. When he was nineteen, he became one of the most outstanding students of Nicanor Plaza, who took him to Paris in 1875. The following year, he enrolled at the Beaux-Arts de Paris, where he studied with François Jouffroy, Alexandre Falguière and Jean-Paul Laurens. He remained in Paris until 1890.

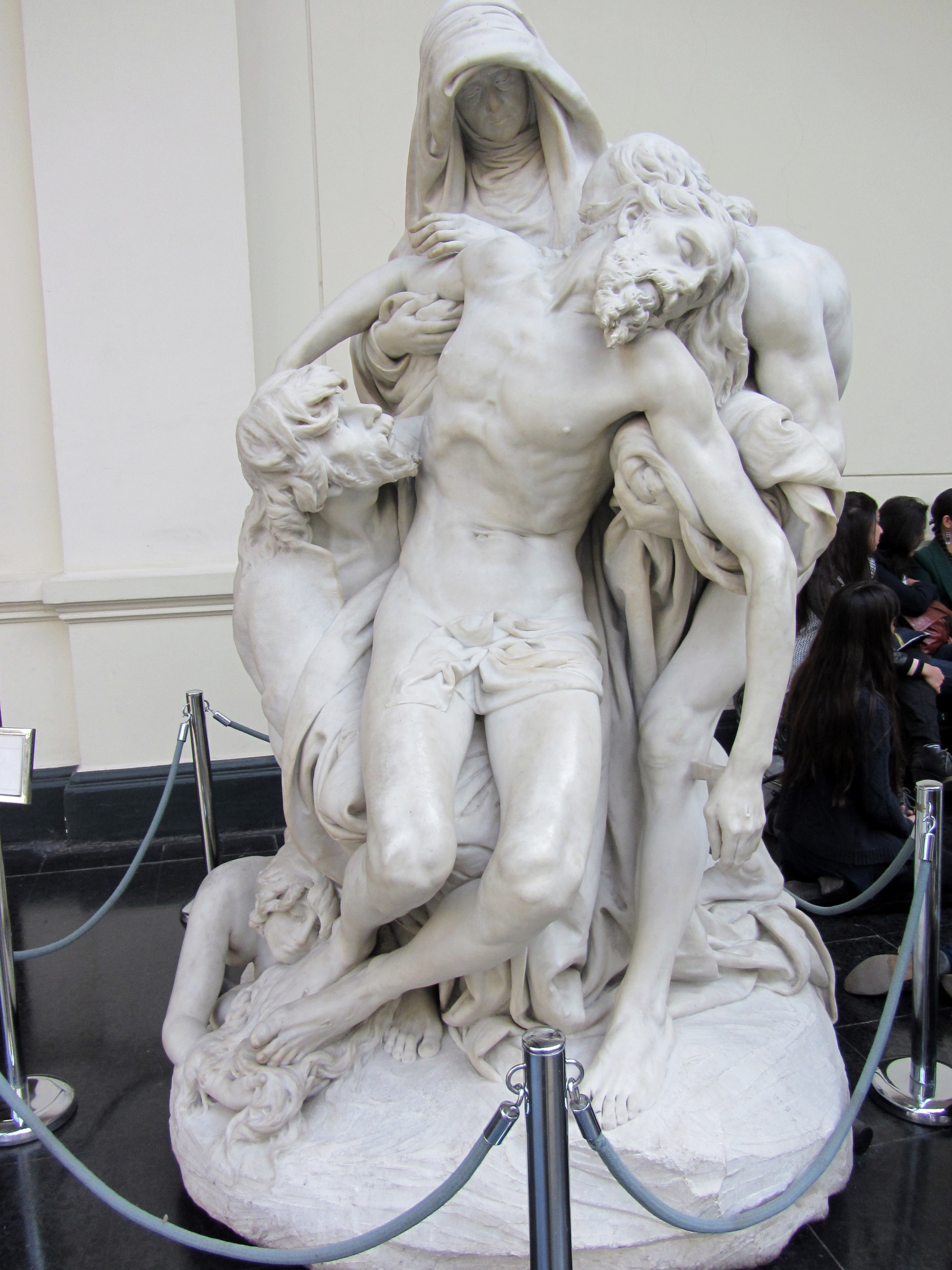
Descent from the Cross

While he was there, he created several works inspired by news bulletins coming from the War of the Pacific, between Chile, Peru and Bolivia. His most notable work was a monument to "El Roto Chileno" (the common man, originally "A Hero of the Pacific"), which won a contest at the Paris Salon of 1882. There are currently two versions of the statue, at the Plaza Yungay in Santiago, and on the main plaza in Ránquil.

He then returned to Chile, where he was awarded several honors. In 1895, the Chilean government sent him back to Paris, to gain experience in organizing an art school. When he returned to Chile, in 1900, he was appointed Director of the Academy of Painting in Santiago, following over a decade of disorganization that had left it with few students. During his time there, he developed an entirely new curriculum. He left his position in 1911, the year after the school had effectively become a part of the National Museum of Fine Arts, at his suggestion.

Most sources say that he returned to Europe and remained there until the 1930s, but several familiar Chilean artists, including José Perotti, Samuel Román Rojas and Laura Rodig, are said to have been his students at the Academia in the early 1920s. The school itself became part of the University of Chile in 1932, and currently occupies a space at the Santiago Museum of Contemporary Art.

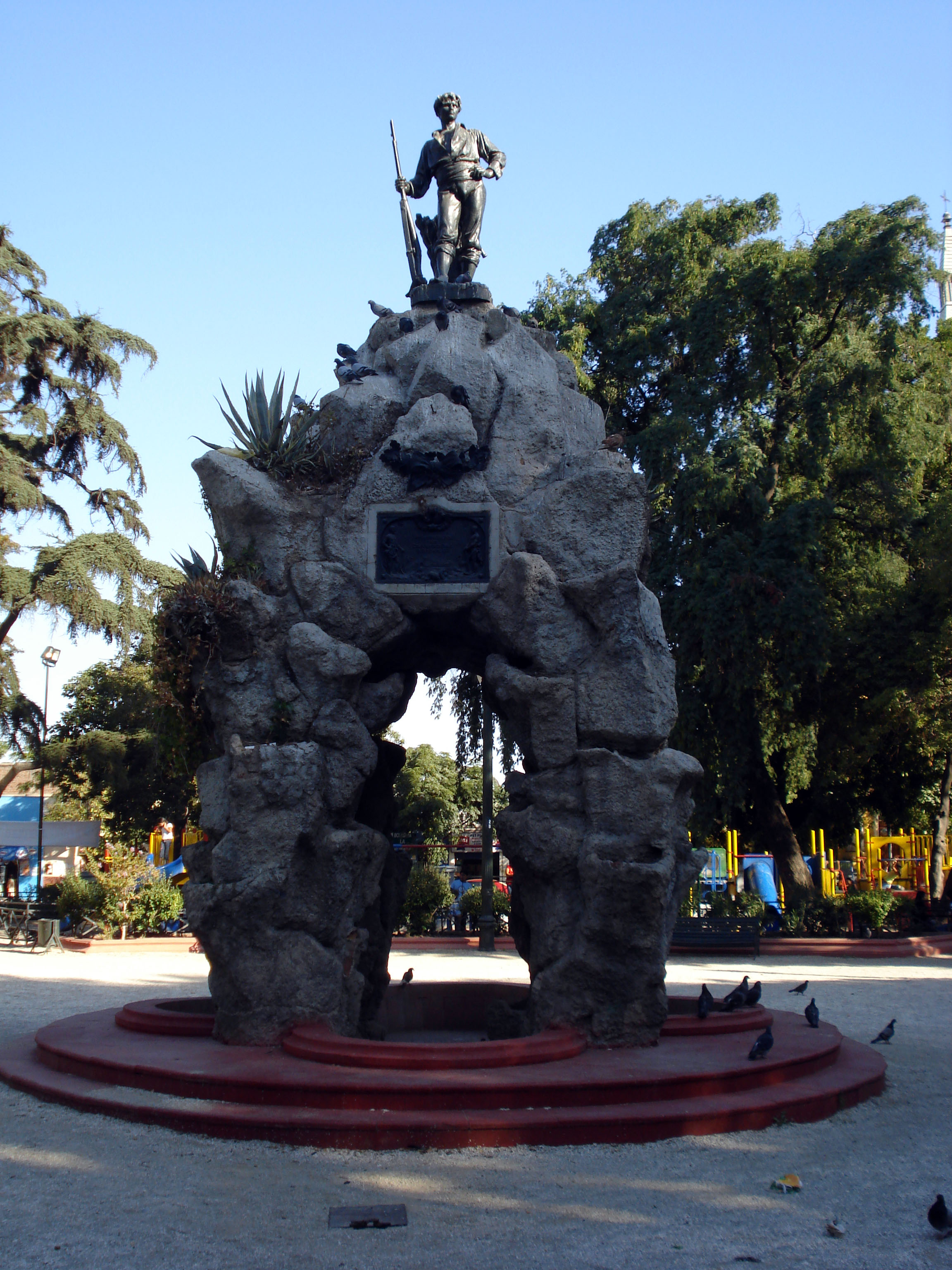
Monument to "El Roto Chileno", Plaza Yungay

In his last years, he suffered from blindness, but continued to sculpt, using his sense of touch. He died in 1941, aged eighty-six.

His other well known works include a monument to General Manuel Baquedano, at the Plaza Baquedano in Santiago, and "The Araucanian", which depicts a representative member of the Mapuche people. Among his religious works, the most famous is "El Descendimiento" (The Descent from the Cross), a marble ensemble that is preserved at the National Museum. This work won him an award at the Paris Salon in 1887.

== Sources ==
- Biography @ Artistas Visuales Chilenos
- Biographical data @ Portal del Arte
- "El laboratorio de papel interviene dibujos de Virginio Arias" @ the Centro Nacional de Conservación y Restauración
