= Álamos Palace =

Building in Barrio Yungay, Santiago, Chile

- Palacio Álamos
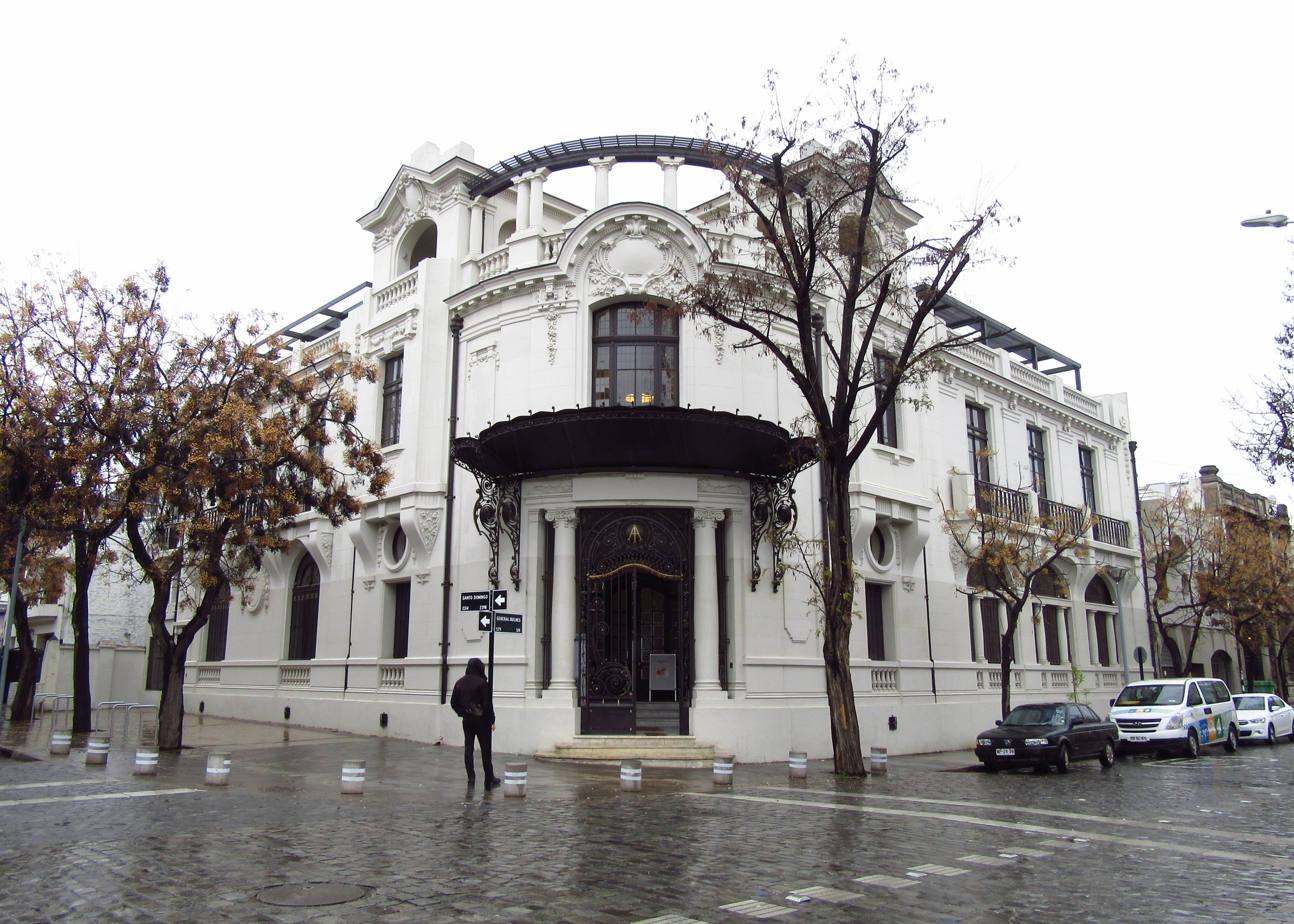

General information
- Architectural style: Neoclassical, Art Nouveau, Beaux Arts.
- Location: Santo Domingo 2398, Santiago, Chile
- Coordinates: 33°26′16″S 70°40′13″W
- Construction started: 1921
- Completed: 1925
- Renovated: 2016

Technical details
- Floor count: 3
- Floor area: 17744 m2

Design and construction
- Architects: Alberto Alamos & Humberto Bravo

Renovating team
- Renovating firm: Proyectos y Rehabilitaciones Kalam

Álamos Palace is a historical building located in Barrio Yungay, on the commune of Santiago in Chile. It currently acts as the Álamos Palace Community Center.

== History ==
The Palace was built by the request of Ignacio Álamos Cuadra. It was designed by Alberto Alamos and Humberto Bravo, and it was constructed between 1921 and 1925. The palace was used by the family of Ignacio Álamos Cuadra until 1946, when his widow perished. After that, the palace saw multiple owners, including the Chilean Universidad Catolica and the Author's Rights Society.

In the 1980s, the building was renovated by architect Juan Holold, although it fell out of use until 2012, when the Ministry of National Assets gave the building to the Santiago Municipality to harbor a community center. The palace was restored and re-inaugurated in 2016 as the Álamos Palace Community Center.
