= 1992 Chilean telethon =

Charity event

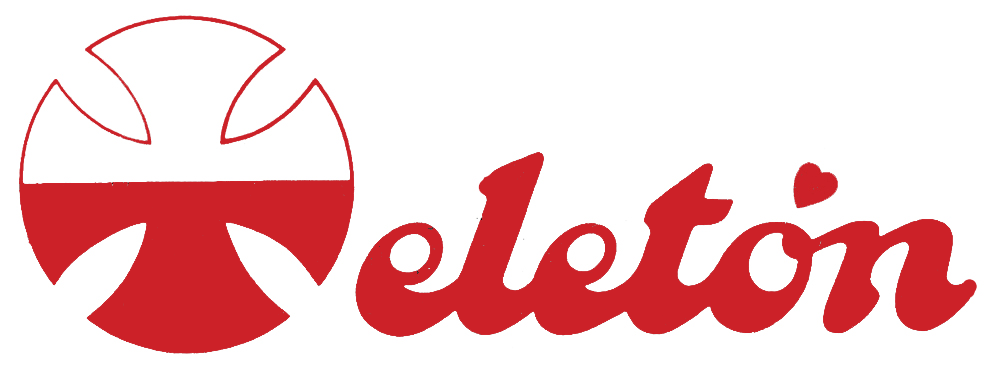
Chilean Telethon's logo

Telethon 1992 is the 11th version of the solidarity campaign conducted in Chile, which took place on 27 and 28 November 1992. The theme of this version was "There is so much to do." The goal was reached with $2,512,056,801 (at that time, later the total was released as $2,874,230,697). The poster boy was Nicholas Sanchez.

The event ended with a Brazilian-Style Carnival finale, with traditional costume and traditional dancing. It would be the end of the old era, entering the New Era in 1994.

== Sponsors ==
Company	Product	Donation (in pesos)
Ace	Detergents	$23.000.000
Banco de Chile	Banking	$39.473.000
Cachantún	Mineral Water	$26.517.825
Cerveza Cristal	Beer	$27.339.164
Colún	Cheese	$26.197.798
Confort	Toilet Paper	$31.500.000
Copec	Petroleum	$33.000.000
Dos en Uno (Clipper)	Chocolates	$33.588.875
Fanta	Soft Drinks	$27.000.000
Jabón Moncler	Soap	$24.352.000
Johnson's Clothes	Tailoring	$23.114.000
Linic	Shampoo	$25.370.000
Lucchetti	Cakes	$27.241.369
Odontine	Toothpaste	$29.186.490
Otto Kraus	Children's Games	$22.643.128
Panadol	Analgesics	$22.600.000
Pisco Control	Fish Products	$28.123.254
Ripley	Chain Stores	$23.080.561
Savory	Ice Creams	$22.569.600
Soda Costa	Biscuits	$28.538.796
Soprole	Milk	$24.056.222
Soprole	Yoghurt	$31.190.850
Super Pollo	Chicken Products	$28.956.747
Té Supremo	Tea	$26.364.424
Winter	Meat Products	$28.162.675
Zuko	Powdered Drinks	$25.154.369
Total Donation		$708.321.147

== Artists ==
=== National singers ===
- (Chile) Illapu
- (Chile) Alberto Plaza
- (Chile) La Ley (band)
- (Chile) La Sonora de Tommy Rey
- (Chile) Ariztía (Chilean group)
- (Chile) Diva
- (Chile) Sindrome
- (Chile) Eduardo Fuentes
- (Chile) Sebastián
- (Chile) Parkinson
- (Chile) Mónica De Calixto
- (Chile) Fernando Casas
- (Chile) Giolito y su Combo
- (Chile) Lorena
- (Chile) Pachuco y la Cubanacán
- (Chile) Valija Diplomática
- (Chile) Miguel Piñera
- (Chile) Zabaleta Brothers
- (Chile) Sonora Palacios
- (Chile) La nueva ola
- (Chile) Zalo Reyes
- (Chile) Germán Casas
- (Chile) Fernando Ubiergo

=== Foreigners ===
- (Spain) Joan Manuel Serrat
- (Italy) (Venezuela) Yordano
- (Puerto Rico) Xavier
- (Nicaragua) Hernaldo Zúñiga
- (Argentina) The Sacados
- (Spain) Luz Casal
- (Spain) Braulio
- (Venezuela) Luisín Landáez
- (Italy) Gionna Gionini
- Banana 5
- (Argentina) Las Primas
- (Spain) Sergio Dalma
- (Argentina) Los Auténticos Decadentes
- (Argentina) Pablito Ruiz
- (France) (Venezuela) Natusha
- (Puerto Rico) José Feliciano
- (Argentina) (Mexico) Amanda Miguel
- (Spain) Bertín Osborne
- (Dominican Republic) Ángela Carrasco
- (Spain) Olé Olé

=== Comedians ===
- Mc Phantom
- Los Manolos
- Luis Pescetti
- Gigi Martin
- Sandy
- D'Angelo
- "Pinto, Paredes y Angulo" (Eduardo Thompson, Guillermo Bruce y Gilberto Guzmán)

=== Child's section ===
- Cachureos
- Arboliris
- Profesor Rossa
- El Club Disney
- Pipiripao
- Niñerías
- Mundo Mágico
- Sólo para menores

=== Adult's section ===
- Las Guerreras
- Mónica Volgin
- Norma Benítez
- Erika de Sautiristro
- Marixa Balli
- Maripepa Nieto

== Transmission ==
- La Red
- UCV Televisión
- Televisión Nacional de Chile
- Megavisión
- RTU Red de Televisión Universidad de Chile
- Universidad Católica de Chile Televisión
- Telenorte
- Canal 8 UCV Televisión
- TV Cable Intercom
