= Sonora Palacios =

Chilean tropical orchestra

- Origin: Santiago, Chile
- Genres: Cumbia, Chilean cumbia, Tropical
- Members: Marty Palacios C (Music Director Trumpet); Marty Palacios M (Manager Director -Timbaleta); Nelson Palacios (Conga drum); Marvyn Palacios (Bongos - Piano); Tanti Ibarra (drums); Paul Jara (calabash); Gerardo Segura (Bass); Mario Suazo (Guitar); Carlos Valdebenito (Piano); Wilson Garcia (Trumpet); Miguel Hille (Trumpet); Michael Bringuez (Trumpet); Camilo Sepulveda (Voice-Chorus); Rodrigo Cardenas (Voice-Chorus); Staff: Francisco Aguilera (Sound); Eddy Palacios (Sound); Victor Lopez (Driver); Flavio Silva (Engineer); Ramón Bringuez (Engineer); Jaising Pasten
- Past members: (Voice) Patricio Zuñiga "Tommy Rey"; Orlando Ramirez; Luis Eyzaguirre; Manuel Rojas; Pilo Mendez; Manuel Palacios; Julio Palacios; Jose Mendoza

Sonora Palacios is one of Chile's oldest tropical orchestras. Formed in the early 1960s, the group is one of the main exponents of Chilean cumbia and were pioneers of the style. They were the first Chilean band to record cumbia and are widely recognized for establishing the popularity of cumbia in Chile.

== History ==
=== Early success ===
In the 1950s, tropical music was very popular among Chileans. Then came the 1960s, a time of great change in the music scene. Along with rock and roll from the US, cumbia style from the Caribbean came to Chile. Amparito Jiménez became very popular in Chile with the song "La Pollera Colora", and in order to adapt to the new trends, tropical bands begin to include in their repertoire cumbia and rock and roll.

It was around this time that the Palacios brothers (Jorge, Patricio, Oscar, Carlos and Marty) created "Sonora Palacios". In 1962, they recorded their first LP record with the songs "La Mafafa" and "El Caminante". In 1964, they got their first contract to work abroad and they travelled to Argentina. They returned to Chile to receive the "Laurel De Oro" award, one of the most important music prizes of that time.

In 1969, the band was awarded two other important prizes, "El Panchito de Oro" and "El Morro", thanks to their success in Chile, Argentina and other countries in South America. The airline Varie and a Yugoslavian tourist agent and producer Putnik hired them to perform in the hotels, bars and clubs in the Czech Republic (then Czechoslovakia), Germany, Italy, France, Hungary, Bulgaria, Yugoslavia and the University of Zagreb in Croatia. Once they returned to Chile they were awarded the "Silver Disc" by the Chilean branch of Philips records.

=== Continuing success, 1965-1980 ===
After the great success of their first LP, the orchestra increase their performances and become frequent guest of the show Sábado Gigante Internacional, the longest-running television variety series in history, which was then in its infancy. Because of their popularity, they were invited to take part in the first Teletón in 1978.

Also in 1978, they recorded "Candombe para José", for which they would later be awarded a "Gold Disc".

In 1979, the band performed in the "El Festival Tropical de Salsa" (Salsa Tropical Festival) in Lucerne, Switzerland and recorded "Feliz Navidad" (Happy Christmas). In 1980, despite some internal struggles, they recorded their last album with lead singer Patricio Zúñiga. The album included one of the most popular songs in Chilean popular culture, "Un año más", commonly played at every New Year's Eve party.

=== Internal crisis ===
From now on, internal crisis would divide the orchestra. In 1982, Patricio Zuñiga, known today as Tommy Rey, left the band after 19 years. Zuñiga was well known as lead singer of the band, his voice and personal stamp were recognized throughout Chile and, with Sonora Palacios, he had helped to create what would become Chilean cumbia.

The reason given by each side for the split differ slightly, but both agree that a key factor was the conflict between the Palacios brothers, led by Marty Palacios, and the rest of the band, led by Zuñiga.

Zuñiga has said:

"Well, the years passed, I was with them for many years, nineteen as I said. In 1982 the problems were quite serious, we hadn't worked much, we had financial problems, we were not recording, we were stuck. Those of us who were not "Palacios" brothers" had a talk, and thought "we can not stand this situation", and decided to separate and form another band. That was in '82".

— Interview with Tommy Rey, April 30, 2011

In the words of Marty Palacios:

"Sometimes, especially in those years, it was difficult to find a singer, because after a while they want to go solo or start something new, and that’s what happened with Tommy, although I think he was influenced by his manager of that time"

— La Cuarta, Marty Palacios 2014

Although difficult, the separation was amicable, and Sonora Palacios and Sonora de Tommy Rey (Zuñiga's band) even share some of their most emblematic songs. In 2006 they performed together in the Viña del Mar International Song Festival in Viña del Mar, Chile, proof of the friendship that exists today between the bands.

== Awards ==
- 1989 Antorcha de Plata Viña del Mar International Song Festival
- 2005 Antorcha de Plata y Oro Viña del Mar International Song Festival
- 2006 Antorcha de Plata y Oro Viña del Mar International Song Festival
- 2012, received an award from the Culture Ministry of Chile as recognition of their extensive career of more than 60 years ("Premio Ministerio de Cultura a Don Marty Palacios por los más de 60 años de trayectoria y su aporte a la música popular")
- 2013 Altazor Award for Best Popular Music album for "50 años en vivo" (50 Years of Live Shows).
- 2013 Premio Presidente de la República a la Música Chilena (President of the Republic Prize for Chilean Music)

== Discography ==
Originally, Sonora Palacios’ record label was Phillips. Once they moved to "Star Sound" records, the original release formats of their songs was altered and grouped into new albums.

=== Albums recorded under Philips, 1964 -1980 ===
- Explosión en Cumbias - 1964
- Sonora Palacios - 1966
- Tropical - 1968
- Volumen 4 - 1971
- Volumen 5 - 1972
- Los Fabulosos - 1975
- Sonora Palacios - 1978
- Feliz Navidad - 1979
- Sonora Palacios - 1980

=== Albums recorded under Star Sounds ===
- Una vez más - 1984
- Esta Es - 1984
- La Inimitable - 1987
- Canta Orlando Ramirez - 1988
- Tropical Internacional - 1989
- A lo Campeón - 1991
- Esta Es - 1991 (same album as that released in 1984, but with two tracks deleted: "En Un Beso La Vida" and "Safari")
- Una Vez Más - 1991? (same album as that released in 1984, but with two tracks deleted: "Sentimental" and "Mi Esperanza")
- Más Éxitos Tropicales - 1992

=== Albums recorded under Calipso Records ===
- La Única - 1994
- Nuestros Grandes Éxitos Vol. 1 - 1995
- Nuestros Grandes Éxitos Vol. 2 - 1996
- Éxitos '97 - 1997
- Éxitos de Oro - 1999
- Éxitos 2000 - 2000

=== More recent albums ===
- 40 Años de Éxitos - 2004 (Sony Music Chile).
- 45 Años haciendo bailar a todo Chile - 2007 (Guyani Producciones).
- Super Éxitos - 2009 (Universo Producciones).
- Los Inolvidables y Nuevos Éxitos - 2009 (Guyani Producciones).
- Cumbia del Casamiento recorded along Sexual Democracia.
- Nuevo Éxitos - 2010 (Guyani Producciones)
- 50 Años - 2011 (Feria Mix).
- Two song recorded with Chico Trujillo: ("Negra Santa", "El Caminante").
- 50 Años (en vivo) - 2012 (Plaza Independencia).
- Yo también canto Cumbia - 2013 (Plaza Independencia)
- (2013) several records with different Chilean singers: Zalo Reyes, Jose Alfredo Fuentes, Maria Jose Quintanilla, Claudio Escobar, Miguel Barriga, Douglas, German Casas, Juan David Rodriguez, Rodolfo Navech, Leandro Martinez.

== Most popular songs ==
- Los Domingos (La Peineta), 1964
- El Galeón Español, 1978
- El Caminante, 1963
- La Mafafa, 1963
- Pedacito de Mi Vida, 1978
- Cumbia Para Adormecerte, 1964
- Candombe Para José, 1978
- Agua Que No Has de Beber (Loco, Loco), 1978
- La Arañita, 1978
- Negrito Cumbá, 1978
- Señora (bolero), 1972

== List of vocalists ==
- Patricio Zuñiga "Tommy Rey", 1964 - 1980
- Orlando Ramirez, 1984 - 1988; returned 1994
- Luis Eyzaguirre, 1986 - 1993; returned 1997 to 2000
- Manuel Rojas, 1991 - 1993
- Pilo Mendez, 1989 - 1991
- Manuel Palacios, 1994 - 2000; returned 2010
- Julio Palacios, 2003 - 2008
- Jose Mendoza, 2009 - 2014
- Rodrigo Cardenas, 2011 to date
- Camilo Sepulveda, 2013 to date

== See also ==
- New Chilean cumbia
