= Plaza Yungay =

Square in Santiago, Chile

Coordinates: 33°26′15.22″S 70°40′26.53″W

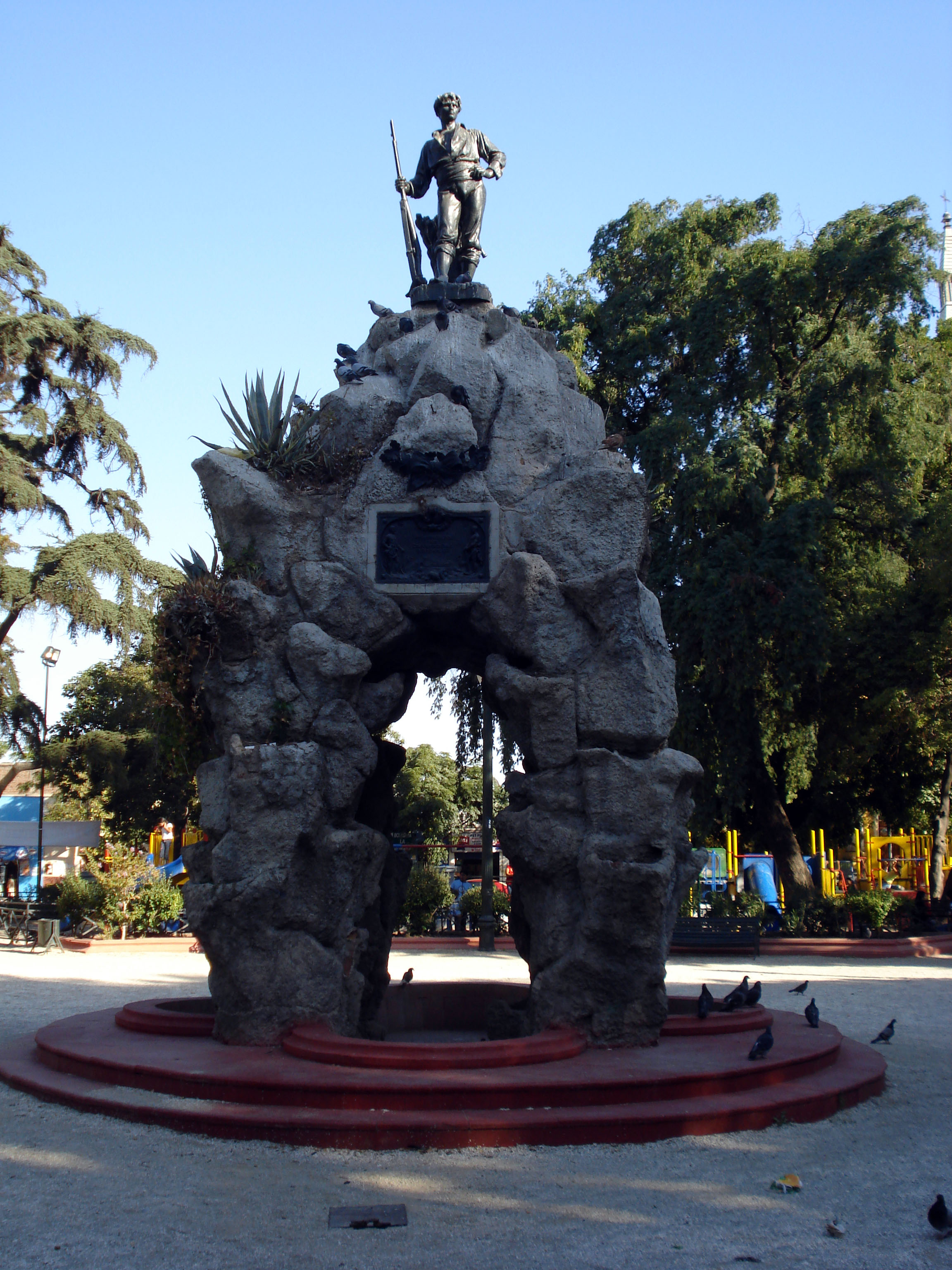
Monument to the Chilean roto in Plaza Yungay

Plaza Yungay is a square located in Barrio Yungay, an historical neighborhood of Santiago, Chile, located at the western limits of the commune of Santiago. The plaza is the home of a monument commemorating the end of Chile's War of the Confederation (1836-1839) against the Peruvian and Bolivian confederation, and a church named for the saint that protects Santiago's residents from earthquakes. Today, it is a lively public space.

== Monument in honor of the Roto Chileno ==
The plaza boasts a monument to the roto chileno, an homage to the common person, created by sculptor Virginio Arias. The sculpture commemorates the Chilean troops that defeated the Peru-Bolivian confederation at the Battle of Yungay on 20 January 1839. The troops were largely common people who dwelled in the city. Rotos was the name the confederation soldiers gave them during the "War of the Pacific" one of Chile's two significant wars.

The monument to the roto chileno, the collective and anonymous hero of the Battle of Yungay, consist of two pillars of uneven, jutting rock which come together in an inverted U shape. Atop the inverted U stands the statue of the roto chileno, a meter and a half high. The pedestal of the statue has an inscription that says

"Chile thanks her sons for both their civic and military virtues"

The statue is wearing a traditional uniform with a rifle standing near his right foot stabilized by his right hand. His left hand on his hip. Behind him stands a bushel of wheat with a sickle between shafts.

The Plaza Yungay hosts festivities relating to the Day of the Roto Chileno, an annual celebration held on 20 January.

== Iglesia de San Saturnino ==
The south west corner of Plaza Yungay is home to the church and parish of Saint Saturninus (San Saturnino) (es); Saint Saturninus is the protector of Santiago residents from tremors and earthquakes. This gothic-style church has three entrances and a tower, and consists of a central rectangular space with two lateral spaces. The construction of the church was first initiated by the priest Luis Benavente in 1844 and completed by the architect Teodor Burchard in 1887.

The church has large stained glass windows that represent the apostles. Among its relics and imagery is a Christ of Good Hope given by the priest Hernán Domeyko Sotomayor in 1892. There is also an organ made by Oreste Carlini in the 1920s.

After the earthquake of 27 February 2010, the government committed the necessary resources to begin the restoration process.

== Daily life ==
The plaza has a number of children's playgrounds, much like those found in Plaza Brasil. The streets surrounding the plaza are also home to a bar, a grocery store, an historic barber shop, and a small shop that sells cheap, to-go ceviche and cheese-stuffed potatoes, or papa rellena (de queso). On certain weekends a small marketplace is set up with people selling goods on blankets. Free Latin American drumming workshops have been held every Sunday since February 2012.

== Fiesta de la Chaya ==
Plaza Yungay was also on the route of the Fiesta de la Chaya in 2011. This celebration is carried out in a different manner in various Latin American countries, and observed in many Chilean cities.

== Mysteries and controversies ==
A poem by Winétt de Rokha (published in her 1936 collection Cantoral) called "Valse en la Plaza de Yungay" celebrates not the monument to the "roto chileno" but the beauty of a mysterious sculpture of a female nude -- "the woman of marble" with "breasts of apple and heliotrope"—as she is touched by the evening light. Outside of De Rokha's poem, no trace of this sculpture remains.

While in office, former mayor of Santiago, Pablo Zalaquett was informed by a judge that his changes to Plaza Yungay - including having trees cut down and removing the grass - were inappropriate because they were not approved of by the National Monuments Council. The city was therefore suspending his changes. Any changes need to be approved of by the council because the plaza is located in an historically protected area. Led by the grassroots organization, Defensores del Barrio Yungay (English: Defenders of the Yungay neighborhood) 2,000 residents of the zone signed a petition asking for the suspension of Zalaquett's activities in the plaza. They also complained that the mayor's office hid and denied information relating to its plans from the neighbors and the organization.

Carolina Tohá, Zalaquett's challenger, won the next mayoral election. Early in her candidacy she expressed dismay at the changes and affirmed that it was inappropriate for Zalaquett to change the plaza without seeking the democratic approval of the residents who actively preserve the patrimony of the neighborhood.
