= Fernando Casas =

Fernando Casas may refer to:

- Fernando de Casas Novoa, Spanish architect
- Fernando Vizcaino Casas, Spanish labour lawyer and writer
- Fernando Casas (singer), see 1992 Chilean telethon
- Fernando Casas (physician), see Chiclana de la Frontera
