= Küstendorf Film and Music Festival =

Küstendorf Film & Music Festival
- Küstendorf Film & Music Festival logo
- Location: Drvengrad, Serbia
- Founded: 2008; 18 years ago
- Awards: Golden Egg
- Hosted by: Emir Kusturica
- Festival date: Every January
- Website: www.kustendorf-filmandmusicfestival.org

Küstendorf Film Festival (Serbian: Кустендорф филмски фестивал) is an annual event held during early January in the village of Drvengrad (also known as Küstendorf) in the Mokra Gora region of Serbia.

Established in 2008, it is a film and music festival organized by Rasta International, film director Emir Kusturica's production company, in the village whose construction he financed in mid-2000s on the slopes of Mećavnik hill. The festival has no commercial sponsors and is partly financed by the Ministry of Culture of Serbia.

In addition to feature films shown in several programs and musical performances, the festival features a competitive component for short films. The festival's main prize, Golden Egg (Zlatno jaje), is awarded for the best short film. Vilko Filač Award is given out for the best cinematography.

== History ==
=== 2008 ===
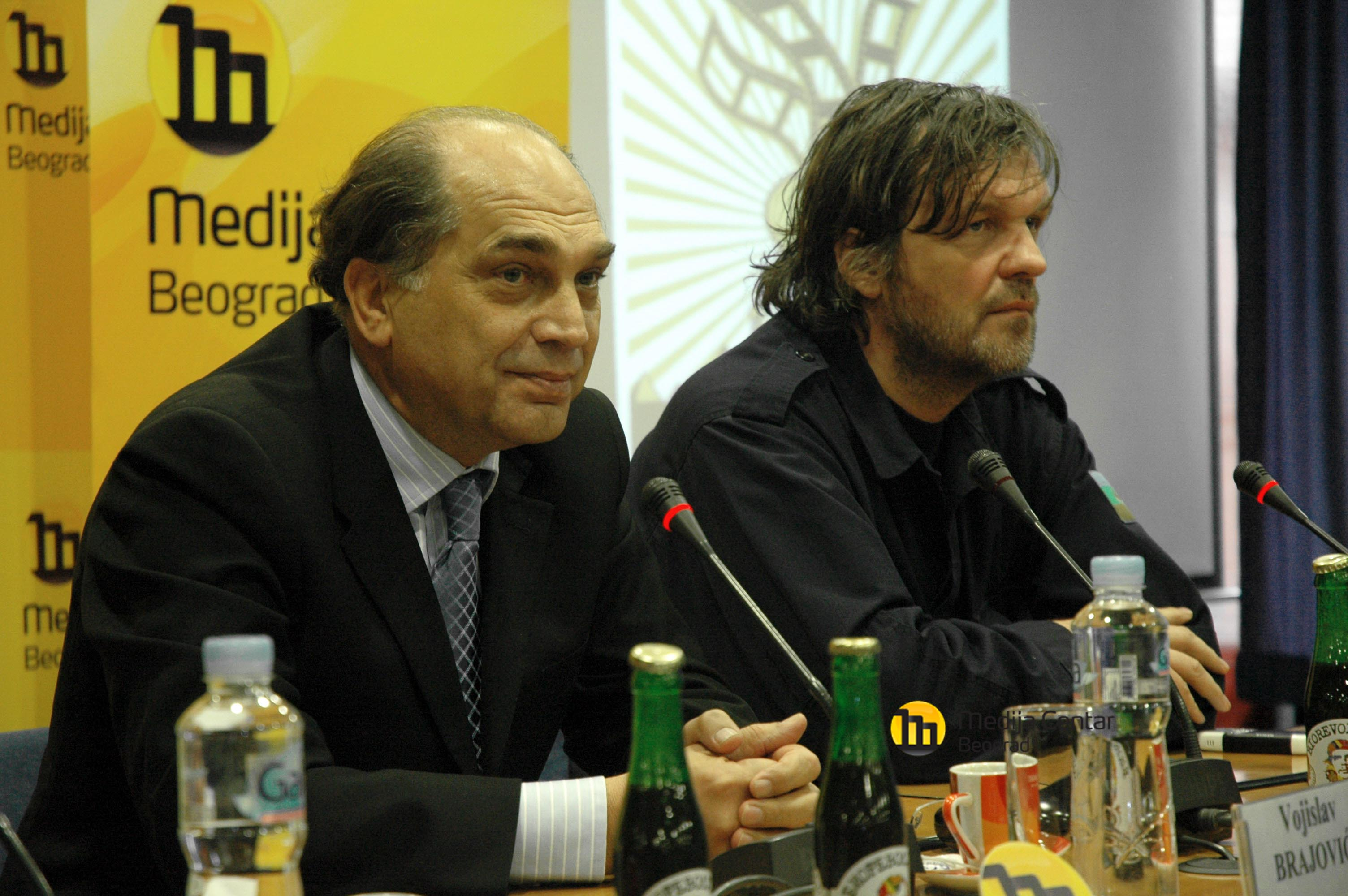
Kusturica and Serbian Minister of Culture Vojislav Brajović announce the new film and musical festival in December 2007.

In its inaugural edition from 14 to 21 January 2008, the festival's main guest was Nikita Mikhalkov who held a workshop, along with a retrospective of his films being shown — 12, A Slave of Love, A Few Days from the Life of I. I. Oblomov, and An Unfinished Piece for Mechanical Piano.

The festival was officially opened with the burial of Die Hard 4.0 at the Bad Films Cemetery. The ceremony featured Nele Karajlić as Orthodox priest, Kusturica as eulogist, girls from Vrelo as wailing women with even the main guest Nikita Mikhalkov joining the procession.

Other guests at the festival included Fatih Akın, Cristian Mungiu (came with his Palme d'Or-winning film 4 Months, 3 Weeks and 2 Days and held a workshop), Miki Manojlović, Michael Radford, Serbian prime minister Vojislav Koštunica, Eran Kolirin, Danish film critic Christian Monggaard, Matija Bećković, and Romanian actor Răzvan Vasilescu.

The three-man jury headed by Peter Handke, featuring Italian film producer Andrea Gambeta and Greek journalist Ninos Feneck Mikelidis, awarded the Golden Egg to Spaniard Jose E. Iglesias Vigil (graduate of National Film School in Łódź and Mistrzowska Szkoła Reżyserii Filmowej Andrzeja Wajdy in Warsaw) for his short film In Between. The Silver Egg went to Englishman Martin Hampton for Possessed, and the Bronze Egg went to the Colombian Franco Lolli (graduate of La Fémis in Paris) for Como todo el mundo (Like Everybody Else).

The musical program consisted of performances by: Almezijan's Obsession from Armenia, Kal from Serbia, Stribor Kusturica & the Poisoners, Vrelo, No Smoking Orchestra, Nervozni Poštar, and Kiki Band.

Held against the backdrop of the 2008 Serbian presidential elections — contested between incumbent Boris Tadić from the ruling center-left Democratic Party (DS) and challenger Tomislav Nikolić from the opposition right-wing Serbian Radical Party (SRS) — as well as speculation that Albanians from Serbia's province of Kosovo were in the final stages of coordination with the United States to unilaterally declare independence, the festival received plenty of attention both in the Serbian and foreign press. Political angles and overtones dominated foreign press reports such as the one by Marie Colmant in center-left Libération who, after giving praise to the festival for celebrating auteur cinema, wondered if the fact that festival's jury is headed by Peter Handke — whom she described as someone "who still smelled of sulfur after being at Milošević's funeral and who wrote about Serbs in panegyric form due to seeing them unjustly accused of all evils" — also mean that Kusturica adheres to these ideas. She answers her own question by saying that, like Handke, Kusturica also believes western Europeans have demonized Serbs and Serbia, but that the Serbian director supports center-left candidate Tadić at the presidential elections.

=== 2009 ===
In 2009, the festival was held from January 8 until January 14. The main guest was Jim Jarmusch who held a workshop and whose retrospective of films was screened - Stranger than Paradise, Down by Law, Dead Man, and Broken Flowers.

Others that held a workshop were Kazakhstani film director Sergey Dvortsevoy whose feature film Tulpan was also shown at the festival and long time Cannes Film Festival artistic director Thierry Frémaux.

The three-person jury included actress Anica Dobra (jury president), producer Karl Baumgartner and film director Gian Luca Farinelli. They awarded the Golden Egg to documentary short film Godog by Japanese director Kohki Hasei, the silver Egg went to a German director Nina Vukovic for Miki's Ballad, and the Bronze Egg went to American Shih-Ting Hung for Viola.

On the music side of things, the festival featured performances by Zdob şi Zdub from Moldavia, Leb i sol, Haydamaky from Ukraine, Natty Bo and the Tom Cats from the United Kingdom, La Mano Ajena from Chile, the No Smoking Orchestra, and folklore ensemble Svetozar Marković.

=== 2010 ===
The main guest of the 2010 edition was Johnny Depp whose retrospective of films was screened — Arizona Dream, Donnie Brasco, and Edward Scissorhands. As a special honour, a life-sized statue of Depp was unveiled by Kusturica at Drvengrad's main street in a brass band ceremony. The arrival of 46-year-old Depp, Kusturica's personal friend and one of the biggest and most bankable Hollywood movie stars at the moment, gave Küstendorf Festival its first taste of global media attention. Latching onto Depp's star power and sex symbol status, electronic and print media outlets from all across the world reported on the actor's stay in Serbia that included publicizing Kusturica's recently announced film project with Depp set to play Mexican revolutionary Pancho Villa. Top Serbian political figures also took note of Depp being in the country; right after landing in Serbia, the film star got taken in by Kusturica for a photo-op visit with Serbian president Boris Tadić at the Andrićev Venac presidential palace in Belgrade before proceeding on to Drvengrad by helicopter.

Other guests, all of whom held workshops, included Raja Amari, Fatih Akın, Elia Suleiman, Pavel Lungin, Asghar Farhadi and Steve Holmgren.

The jury was headed by director Marjane Satrapi (with producer Sara Driver and producer Jonathan Weisgal rounding out the trio). The winning film they picked was Paradis Perdu (Lost Paradise) by Mihal Brezis & Oded Binnun.

The musical program selected by Nele Karajlić included: Global Kryner from Austria, Aynur Doğan from Turkey, Os Festicultores Troupe from France, Vladimir Maričić Quartet, Rubl from Russia, Tonino Carotone from Spain, and the No Smoking Orchestra.

=== 2011 ===
The fourth edition of the festival took place from 5th until 11 January with the opening ceremony inspired by a scene from Fellini's Amarcord featuring Nele Karajlić dressed in a bear costume and Vrelo girls followed by Serbian Minister of Culture Nebojša Bradić officially proclaiming the festival open. Serbian government's Ministry of Culture contributed RSD25 million (~€250,000) for this year's festival including the addition of Dom pisaca (Writers' Center) at Drvengrad.

Abbas Kiarostami was the main guest and a retrospective of his films — Close-Up, Taste of Cherry, Where Is the Friend's Home?, and Through the Olive Trees — was screened.

Additionally the festival was visited by Gael García Bernal, Nikita Mikhalkov, Boris Mitić, Jan Hřebejk, and Petr Jarchovsky.

The 3-person jury presided by the Wild Bunch founder Vincent Maraval (with professor Iva Draškić Vićanović and producer Richard Brick rounding out the trio) awarded the Golden Egg to young Russian author Sonya Karpunina for The Chance. The Silver Egg went to Polish director Julia Kolberger for Tomorrow I’ll be Gone, and the Bronze Egg went to Serbian Ognjen Isailović for Golden League.

The festival saw musical performances from: Beogradski Sindikat, Ngoma Africa Band from Tanzania, Manouchka Orkestär from France, Andre Williams, and Farmers Market from Norway.

The festival featured controversy in regards to the appearance of Serbian documentary filmmaker Boris Malagurski. Despite being announced as guest whose travel costs and stay were to be covered by the festival with his documentary The Weight of Chains scheduled to screen after Kusturica reportedly saw it and liked it, Malagurski ended up being uninvited from the festival with his film removed from the screening schedule without explanation. Inquiring as to what had occurred, Malagurski reportedly contacted the same contacts within Küstendorf organization that had booked him at the festival in the first place, but received a non-specific answer that "things have gotten difficult, the decision is no longer ours". In January 2015, Malagurski spoke about the episode: "According to the information I was able to obtain, the person responsible for The Weight of Chains not being screened at Küstendorf is Nebojša Bradić, then culture minister and member of G17+, a political party the movie is critical of. It's unfortunate, really, one would think a party supposedly advocating "European and Western values" would not specifically go out of its way to silence free speech, freedom of thought, and pluralism, which is exactly what they did in this instance. I was also a bit disappointed that Kusturica, a world-renowned director with so much acclaim and stature, caved in to an entirely irrelevant bureaucrat like Bradić".

=== 2012 ===
The fifth Küstendorf Festival occurred from 17th until 23 January with Kim Ki-duk and Nuri Bilge Ceylan as main guests. In their honour, this year's retrospective of greatness programme featured their films — Ki-duk's Bad Guy and 3-Iron as well as Ceylan's Kasaba and Uzak. Furthermore, their latest films — Ki-duk's Arirang and Ceylan's Once Upon a Time in Anatolia were shown as part of the contemporary trends programme.

Additional guests, all of whom held workshops, included Abel Ferrara (his latest 4:44 Last Day on Earth shown in contemporary trends programme), Isabelle Huppert, Tahar Rahim, Marjane Satrapi (Chicken with Plums), the Dardenne brothers (their The Kid with a Bike shown), Andreas Dresen (Stopped on Track), Frederikke Aspöck (Out of Bounds), and Olivier Horlait. Cannes Film Festival artistic director Thierry Frémaux made a return visit to the festival.

On the last day, the festival was visited by Milorad Dodik, the president of Republika Srpska (Serb entity within neighbouring Bosnia-Herzegovina. The previous June, Kusturica and Dodik's government started an architectural project — Kamengrad or Andrićgrad — under construction in Višegrad.

The jury consisting of Iranian actress Leila Hatami, French producer Pierre Edelman, and Serbian actor Zoran Cvijanović awarded the Golden Egg to Spaniard Fernando Pomares, a student at ESCAC (Escuela de Cine de Catalunya) in Barcelona, for his short Alto Sauce. The Silver Egg went to Serb Jelena Gavrilović for Boys Where Are You? while Piotr Subbotko of Poland got the Bronze Egg for Glasgow. During closing ceremonies, Kusturica screened Our Life, his 15-minute segment in the 7-segment film project Words with Gods.

In its fifth edition, the festival finally began attracting larger international media attention with several established publications and electronic outlets sending reporters to cover it. As a result, it received affirmative notices in Euronews, El País, Le Monde, The Independent, and Los Angeles Times as well as a series of glowing reports in the Filmmaker magazine whose reporter interviewed many of this year's Küstendorf's guests.

=== 2013 ===
The sixth edition of Küstendorf took place from 16th until 22 January. The grand opening ceremony included Kusturica again taking on Bruce Willis in a fistfight signifying a "battle between Goliath and David, between ideology-based film and auteur film". Though originally planned to be shown outdoors on a holographic screen, the fight had to be moved indoors due to bad weather.

Chinese director Zhang Yimou was this year's main guest at the festival. In addition to his visit that included a workshop with film students, the retrospective of his films was shown, including Not One Less and Raise the Red Lantern as well as his latest film The Flowers of War as part of the contemporary programme.

The short film competition included 28 films from all over the world. The 3-member jury included Israeli actress and novelist Alona Kimhi (jury president), producer Michael Hausman, and Oleg Jeknić.

Other guests included Benh Zeitlin (screened his Beasts of the Southern Wild as part of contemporary programme and held a workshop), Aleksei Balabanov (his latest film Me Too screened in contemporary programme and he held a workshop), Audrey Tautou (held a workshop and visited Kamengrad), Matteo Garrone, Monica Bellucci, Yeşim Ustaoğlu, Elia Suleiman, Olja Bećković, Matija Bećković, and Péter Gothár.

Monica Bellucci's 3-day stay at the festival, which Kusturica referred to as "the beautiful spice that captures attention", created another wave of international media coverage similar to three years earlier when Johnny Depp visited. The Italian actress' star power, glamorous image, and sex appeal generated media attention that by proxy also created publicity for the festival as well as for her just announced film with Kusturica tentatively titled Love and War. In another similarity to Depp's 2010 visit, Bellucci also had a wall-to-wall promotional schedule that included media and visiting state dignitaries — on 19 January she flew into Banja Luka where she was met by Kusturica who first took her for a photo-op visit with Milorad Dodik, the president of Republika Srpska. During the visit, Kusturica announced plans for a movie set during Bosnian War with Bellucci playing a Serbian woman, scheduled to begin shooting in May 2013 in Trebinje with Dodik and Republika Srpska authorities involved in financing. She and Kusturica then flew by helicopter to Kamengrad for another photo-op before finally crossing the border into Serbia for the festival site in Drvengrad. The next day, Serbian prime minister Ivica Dačić came to Drvengrad and had a photo-op visit arranged with the actress during which he gave her a reprint of the White Angel fresco from the Mileševa monastery.

=== 2014 ===
The festival was held from the 18th until the 23rd of January with Bérénice Bejo presiding over the jury that also includes screenwriters Guillermo Arriaga and Srđan Koljević.

=== 2015 ===
Going into its eight edition, the festival got a shot in the arm with the MovieMaker magazine naming it one of the '25 Coolest Film Festivals in the World'.

== Awards ==
=== Golden Egg for Best Short Film ===
Year	Film	Director	Jury members
2008	In Between	(Spain) Jose E. Iglesias	Peter Handke, Andrea Gambeta, Ninos Feneck Mikelidis
2009	Godog	(Japan) Kohki Hasei	Anica Dobra, Karl Baumgartner, Gian Luca Farinelli
2010	Paradis Perdu	(France) Mihal Brezis (Israel) Oded Binnun	Marjane Satrapi, Sara Driver, Jonathan Weisgal
2011	The Chance	(Russia) Sonya Karpunina	Vincent Maraval, Iva Draškić Vićanović, Richard Brick
2012	Alto Sauce	(Spain) Fernando Pomares	Leila Hatami, Pierre Edelman, Zoran Cvijanović
2013	Stammering Love	(Switzerland) Jan Czarlewski	Alona Kimhi, Michael Hausman, Oleg Jeknić
2014	The Exhibition	(Slovakia) Andrej Kolenčik, Peter Beganyi	Bérénice Bejo, Guillermo Arriaga, Srđan Koljević
2015	Stella Maris	(Italy) Giacomo Abbruzzese	Claudie Ossard, Amanda Nevill, Alex Garcia
2016	Watrburg	(Hungary) David Borbás	Maji-da Abdi, Divna Vuksanović, Flaminio Zadra
2017	Thorn	(Israel) Michael Alalu	Geling Yan, Christian Valsamidis, Nikola Ležaić
2018	Bomboné	(Palestine) Rakan Mayasi	Peca Popović, Vlastimir Sudar, Nikola Vučinić
2019	All Inclusive	(Switzerland) Corina Schwingruber Ilić	Stana Katic, Slobodan Despot, Tancrede Ramonet, Michel Amathieu
2020	The Christmas Gift	(Romania) Bogdan Muresanu	Paolo Virzì, Tonino Benacquista, Vladislav Tkachiev
