= New Chilean cumbia =

Music genre

New Chilean Cumbia
- Stylistic origins: Cumbia villera – Cumbia chicha – Chilean cumbia – Chilean rock – Latin music
- Cultural origins: Chile

The New Chilean Cumbia also known as New Chilean Cumbia Rock (Spanish: Nueva cumbia chilena, Nueva cumbia rock chilena) is a subgenre of cumbia music that originated in Chile in the early 2000s and that largely surfaced in mainstream media in 2009 and 2010. In contrast to older cumbias the lyrics of New Chilean Cumbia deals more with urban life and combines aspects of rock, hip hop and a wide variety of Latin American genres like Andean music, salsa, the son, reggae, boleros, ska, Latin-African music, diablada and even folklore from the Balkans, like the Klezmer, and Gipsy music.

While the movement has various influences its roots lie in the Chilean cumbia tradition established by Orquesta Huambaly, Giolito y su Combo, Orquesta Cubanacán, La Sonora Palacios and Sonora de Tommy Rey, but in contrast to these bands the New Chilean Cumbia is aimed towards a younger public. The New Chilean Cumbia public comes often from the middle classes.

The movement has been contrasted to the heavily aired and commercialized Chilean Romantic Cumbia whose commercially most successful acts are La Noche and Américo. The New Chilean Cumbia is also distinct from the Argentine Cumbia Villera a genre that enjoys certain popularity in Chile and relies on synthesizers and focuses on marginal shanty town life.

The most popular New Chilean Cumbia acts include: Chico Trujillo, Juana Fe, La Mano Ajena, Banda Conmoción, Villa Cariño, Combo Ginebra, La María Goyo (psychedelic cumbia), Sonora Barón and Santa Feria.
