= Un Año Más =

Song by Los Vikings 5

from the album Cumbias Güenonas
- Released: 1977
- Genre: Chilean cumbia
- Length: 3:45
- Label: Odeon
- Songwriter: Hernán Gallardo Pavez

"Un Año Más" (transl. "One More Year") is a ballad composed by Hernán Gallardo Pavez. It was recorded as a Chilean cumbia song in 1977 by the Coquimbo group Los Vikings 5, then later in the same genre by Sonora Palacios (in 1978) and La Sonora de Tommy Rey (in 1992). Internationally, the piece was recorded in the son style by the Venezuelan group Billo's Caracas Boys, in 1981.

The danceable version of this song has become extremely popular in Chile, especially around New Year celebrations. It is considered Chile's "New Year's hymn."

== History ==
In December 1977, ahead of New Year's 1978, the professor and composer Hernán Gallardo Pavéz of Coquimbo, Chile, composed the song "Un Año Más." It was originally structured as a ballad, evoking the sense of nostalgia that starting a new year brings, and inspired in part by the recent deaths of his parents. Gallardo first offered the song to the popular artist Luis Tirado, to record with the group Los Cumaná, but the group wasn't interested, and the arrangement fell through. Another, danceable version, arranged as a salsa, was done by the group Macalunga, but it was not until Los Viking's 5 recorded it in 1977 as a cumbia song that it more or less settled in its definitive form.

While Gallardo was working as a pianist at the piano bar of the restaurant Alcázar, Marty Palacios, the trumpet player for the tropical orchestra Sonora Palacios, heard him play "Un Año Más." Six months later, in 1978, Sonora Palacios recorded the song, resulting in the well-known version that brought "Un Año Más" to a wide audience and gave it its continuous popularity. The 1992 cover by La Sonora de Tommy Rey is another popular version.

The song is one of the country's most popular cumbias and is frequently played during New Year's festivities in Chile, particularly as the clock strikes midnight.
