= De Libertad y Amor =

Studio album by Illapu
- Released: 1984
- Recorded: April – July 1984
- Genre: Chilean music Folk music Andean music
- Length: 41:21
- Label: EMI, WEA International
- Producer: Daniel Leon - Illapu

Illapu chronology
Y Es Nuestro (1983)	De Libertad y Amor (1984)	Para Seguir Viviendo (1985)

De Libertad y Amor (Of Freedom and Love) was a music album released by the Chilean folk group Illapu in exile in France in 1984.

== Track listing ==
1. ”De libertad y amor”/Of Freedom and Love/ (D. Torres - Roberto Márquez) - 3:27
2. ”Población La Victoria”/Town "La Victoria" [Instrumental] (R.Márquez) - 4:17
3. ”Puerto Rico, Puerto Pobre”/Rich Port, Poor Port (Pablo Neruda - José M. Márquez) - 4:47
4. ”Pampa Lirima” (Roberto Márquez) - 4:19
5. ”Golpe Tocuyano” (Tino Carrasco) - 3:47
6. ”Canción de Octubre”/Song for October - [Instrumental] (Roberto Márquez) - 3:15
7. ”Copla de Morenada” (Roberto Márquez) - 3:15
8. ”No Pronuncies Mi Nombre”/Don't Pronounce My Name (Roque Dalton - Roberto Márquez) – 5:06
9. ”María Paleta” (Venezuelan Trad.) - 3:17
10. ”Un Dia Borrare Esta Página”/One Day I Will Erase this Page (Quilo Martinez - Roberto Márquez) - 3:47 www.quilomartinez.com

== Personnel ==
- Roberto Márquez B.
- Eric Maluenda G.
- Andrés Márquez B.
- José M. Márquez B.
- Juan C. Márquez B.
- Jaime Márquez B.
