= Roto =

Term used to refer to the Chilean people

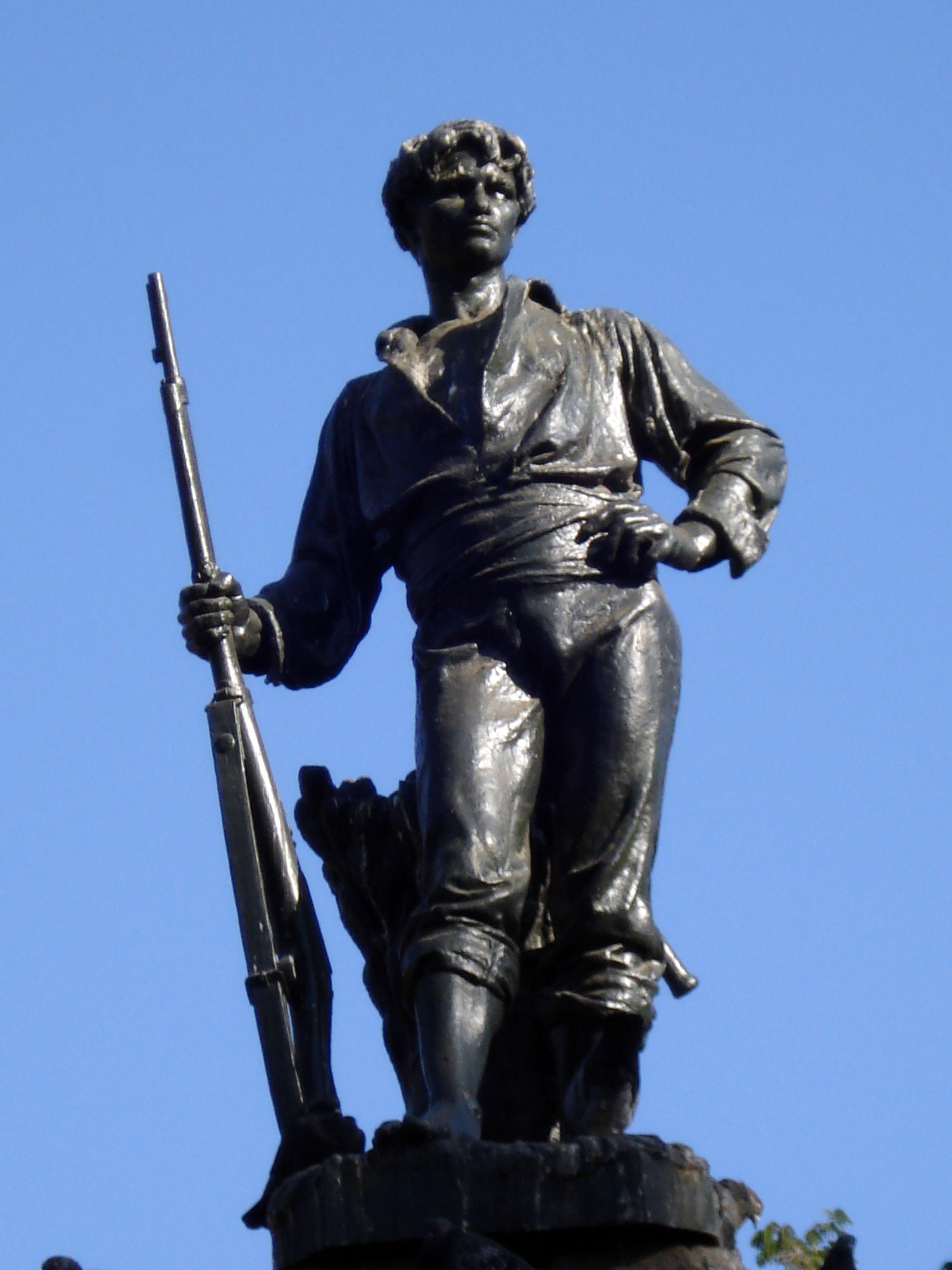
Monument to the Chilean roto, Plaza Yungay, Santiago

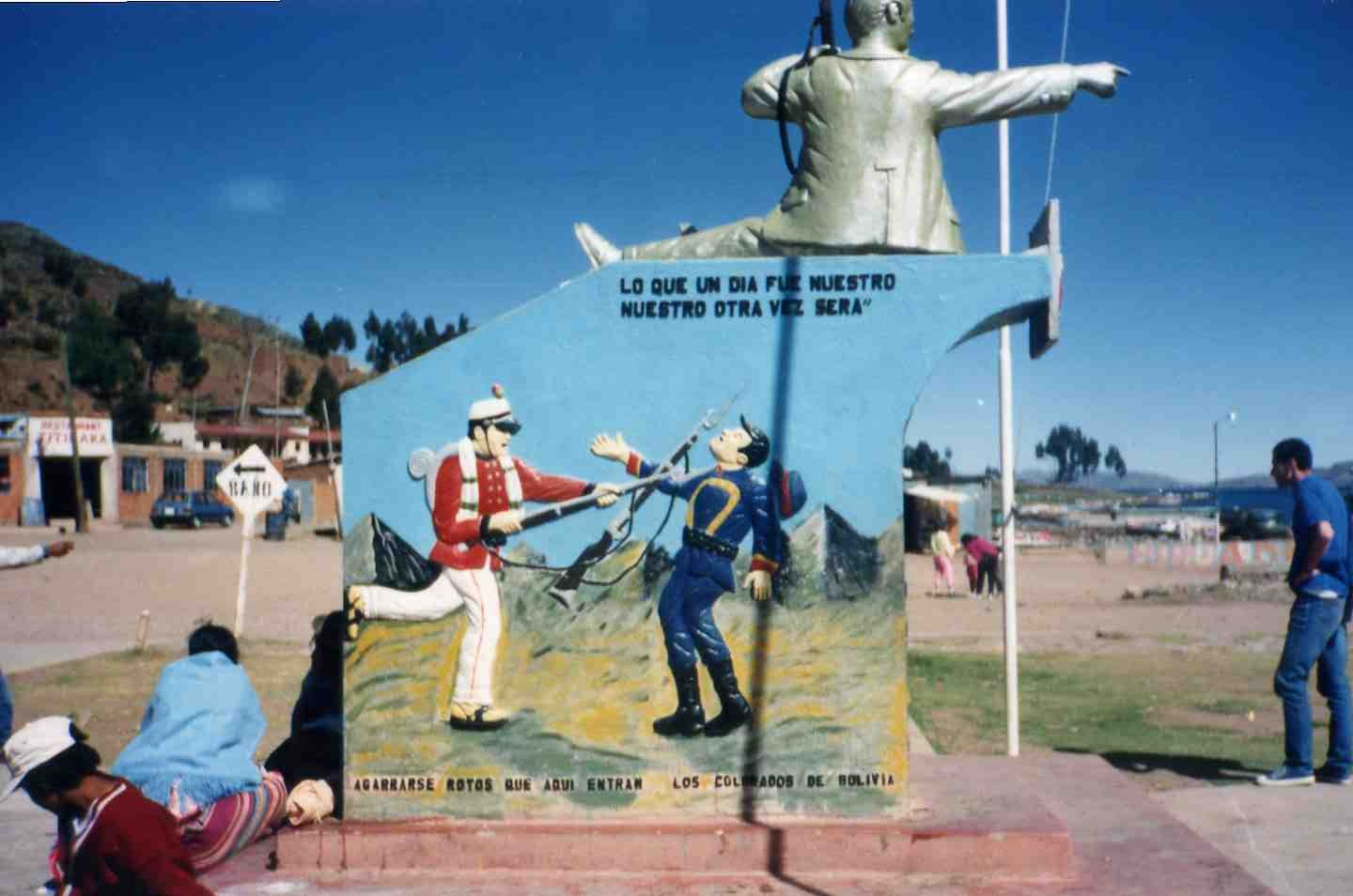
Example of recent expressions of Bolivian irredentism over territorial losses in the War of the Pacific (1879–1884). In the mural it is written; "What once was ours, will be ours once again", and "Hold on rotos (Chileans), because here come the Colorados of Bolivia"

Roto, f. rota, (literally "torn" or "broken") is a term used to refer to Chilean people and in particular to the common Chilean. In Chile, from the start of the 20th century, it was applied with a negative classist connotation to poor city-dwellers. It is also used contemptuously in other Spanish-speaking countries, especially Bolivia and Peru, to refer to Chileans in a derogatory manner. Otherwise, despite its defects, the roto is also considered a figure of national identity and pride in Chile.

== Historical usage ==
The term roto has been used in Peru since the times of the Spanish conquest, when Diego de Almagro's disappointed troops returned to Cuzco (after a failed gold-seeking expedition in Chile) with their torn clothes, due to the extensive and laborious passage on foot through the Atacama Desert. In the early days of Santiago its inhabitants were notoriously poorly dressed as result of a lack of food and supplies. Some Spanish came to dress with hides from dogs, cats, sea lions and foxes.

This term became more used after the Chilean campaigns against the Peru-Bolivian Confederation in 1836, when Chilean troops defeated the confederation at the Battle of Yungay on 20 January 1839. In Chile, tributes were paid to the victors of Yungay and, in a gesture of recognition, 20 January was declared the Día del Roto Chileno (Day of the Chilean Roto), and the War of the Pacific (1879–84).

The figure of the Chilean Roto is commemorated by very diverse organisations and actors such as the Chilean Army, ultra-nationalist activists, the Communist Party and local organisations of ordinary citizens. The Army has a particular appreciation to the figure which was regarded as the main hero –a collective and anonymous hero- of some of the most crucial battles in the war against Bolivia and Peru. In this context, the webpage of the Chilean Army states:

The patriotism, bravery and heroism was embodied in the Chilean roto, who represents the ordinary man that left all to fight for its country. This was the one who fought in Yungay and characterised himself by his fierceness and determination.

== See also ==
- Descamisado
