= Plaza Brasil =

Coordinates: 33°26′26″S 70°39′57″W

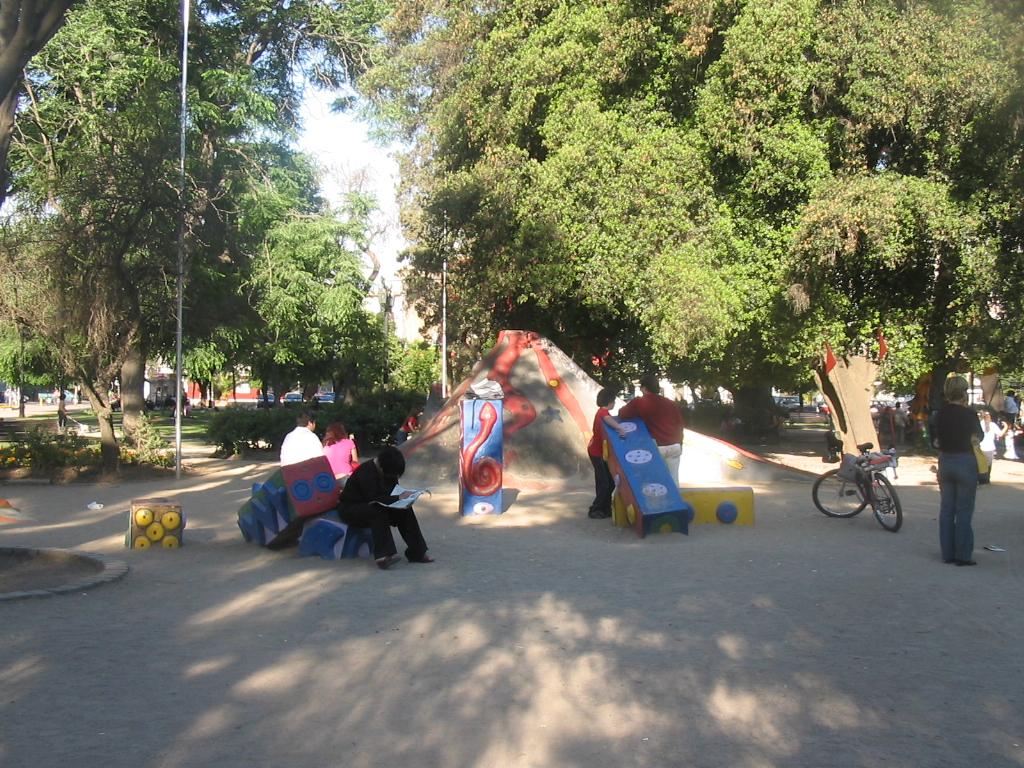
Plaza Brasil.

Plaza Brasil (Brasil Square) is located in Barrio Brasil, a neighborhood of Santiago, Chile known for its strong artistic and cultural scene. The square is bordered by Avenida Brasil to the east, Huérfanos street to the south, Compañía de Jesús street to the north and Maturana street to the west. Access to the square is via the Cumming station of the Santiago Metro.

== History ==
Plaza Brasil has a long tradition and history, linked to the cañada (English: glen) of Diego García de Cáceres. The glen stood in what is now Avenida Brasil, a main road which at various points in the past has been known as Cañada de Cáceres, Cañada de Saravia and Calle de la Acequia de Negrete.

The construction of the square dates to the beginning of the 20th century, when the Municipality of Santiago bought some buildings in the sector to form the square. It was inaugurated on January 20, 1902.

As the years passed, the square - located in a traditional neighborhood - was gradually abandoned as the sector underwent a slow depopulation, due mainly to the inorganic growth of the city of Santiago. Following the 1985 earthquake, the sector began to be rebuilt and new residents arrived, giving a new impetus to Barrio Brasil, which is now home to numerous restaurants, entertainment centers, schools and institutes of higher education.

On the western side of the square is Galpón Víctor Jara, home of the Víctor Jara Foundation and a popular night venue.

The children's play equipment in the center of the square was inaugurated in 1993 and consists of 22 play sculptures created by the artist Fédérica Matta. They represent various cultural and geographic symbols of Chilean identity.

== See also ==
- Barrio Brasil
