= Barrio Yungay =

Neighborhood of Santiago, Chile

Coordinates: 33.4376°S 70.6736°W

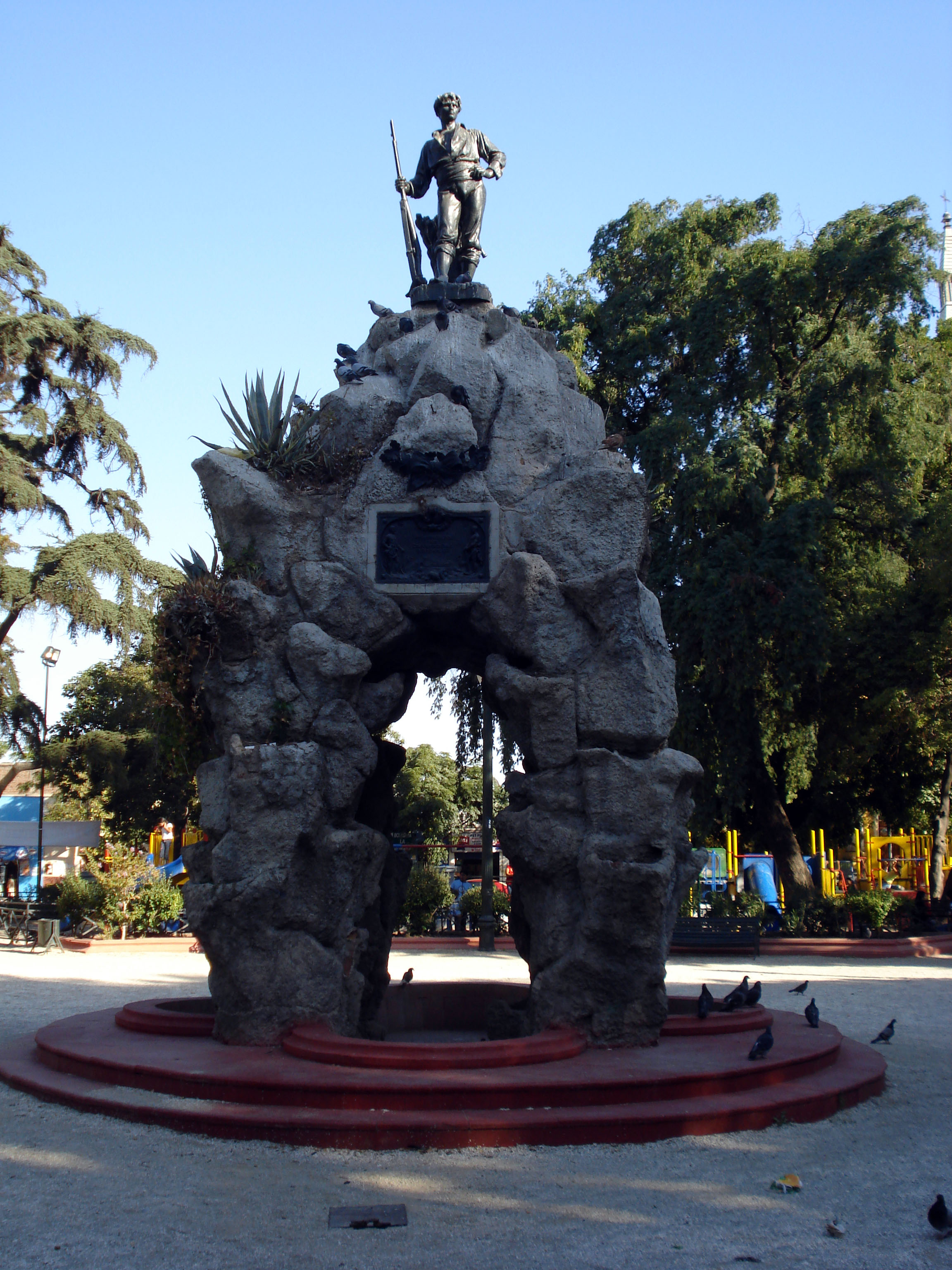
Plaza Yungay

Barrio Yungay is a neighborhood of Santiago, Chile, located to the west of the city center in the commune of Santiago and to the west of Barrio Brasil.

== History ==
This neighborhood was a rural area until 1835. The land was owned by José Santiago Portales Larraín, who was the father of Diego Portales. After his death, the 350 ha (860 acres) land area that made up the estate was divided into lots. The westernmost portion was purchased by the Chilean State in order to create the Quinta Normal de Agricultura. Meanwhile, Plaza Yungay and the San Saturnino parish church, which are in the heart of the neighborhood, were created on the land inherited by Diego Portales.

Barrio Yungay was officially proclaimed in 1839 as a way of commemorating the Chilean victory in the Battle of Yungay.
