= Julio Zúñiga =

Argentine footballer

Personal information
- Full name: Julio Gabriel Zúñiga
- Date of birth: 30 January 1995 (age 31)
- Place of birth: Argentina
- Height: 1.78 m (5 ft 10 in)
- Position: Midfielder

Team information
- Current team: Deportivo Madryn

Youth career
- River Plate

Senior career*
Years	Team	Apps	(Gls)
2016–2017	River Plate	0	(0)
2016–2017	→ Chacarita Juniors (loan)	11	(0)
2018	Ateneo Mariano Moreno		
2018–2019	San Lorenzo Alem	15	(1)
2019–	Deportivo Madryn	15	(0)
- * Club domestic league appearances and goals as of 00:30, 24 March 2020 (UTC)

Julio Gabriel Zúñiga (born 30 January 1995) is an Argentine footballer who plays as a midfielder for Deportivo Madryn.

== Career ==
Zúñiga started his career with River Plate of the Primera División. In September 2016, Zúñiga joined Chacarita Juniors on loan. His debut for the club arrived on 22 October in a 1–0 defeat to All Boys. Eleven further appearances came in 2016–17, a season that ended with promotion to the 2017–18 Primera División. He returned to River Plate prior to the 2017–18 season but was released soon after. Zúñiga joined regional league team Ateneo Mariano Moreno in March 2018. A move to Torneo Federal A's San Lorenzo was completed in September. His first goal came versus Deportivo Maipú on 10 October.

== Career statistics ==
As of 16 January 2019.

Club statistics
Club	Season	League			Cup		Continental		Other		Total	
Club	Season	Division	Apps	Goals	Apps	Goals	Apps	Goals	Apps	Goals	Apps	Goals
River Plate	2016–17	Primera División	0	0	0	0	0	0	0	0	0	0
Chacarita Juniors (loan)	2016–17	Primera B Nacional	11	0	1	0	—		0	0	12	0
San Lorenzo	2018–19	Torneo Federal A	13	1	0	0	—		0	0	13	1
Career total			24	1	1	0	0	0	0	0	25	1
