= Sexual Democracia =

Chilean folk-rock band

- Origin: Valdivia, Chile
- Genres: Alternative rock, Pop rock, Comedy rock, Folk rock, Cumbia
- Years active: 1988–present
- Past members: Miguel Barriga Parra; Andres Magdalena; Germán Cespedes; Ivan Briceño; Claudio Pino
- Website: www.sexualdemocracia.cl

Sexual Democracia are a Chilean folk-rock band, active in the late 1980s until the early 2000s. Sexual Democracia is among the commercially most successful bands from Valdivia. Its second album Buscando Chilenos 2 reached platinum status due to strong sales.

== History ==
The band was created in 1988 by Miguel Barriga, Iván Briceño, Samuel Gallardo, Juan "Cordero" Paredes, Vicente Aguilera, Alberto Larraín and Alexi Cárdenas during final years of the Pinochet regime, all members were students of Universidad Austral de Chile at time. The band took name after a show presented by Miguel Barriga at the universities Cine Club where the tense atmosphere of the Chilean national plebiscite of 1988 was parodied.

After a failed censorship attempt due to their perceived obscene band name the band was allowed to play in university events. By 1992 Sexual Democracia reached major exposition when it performed in Viña del Mar International Song Festival. After that the band evolved to a more Latin-American style leaving behind much of its Chilean lyrics, expression of this is the cumbia song "Macondo".

The band had a profound impact on Valdivian society when, as one of the most known bands of Valdivia, they joined the efforts to establish a new region and withdrawing Valdivia Province from Los Lagos Region. In this spirit they created the song "Regionalización" which advocates against centralism and for the creation of a new region with Valdivia as capital. Finally, in 2007, when Los Ríos Region was created "Regionalización" had become the hymn of that movement.

A remix of their song "Regionalización" is played in the home matches of the basketball team Deportes Valdivia.
