= Illapu =

Chilean folk and Andean musical ensemble formed in 1971 in northern Chile

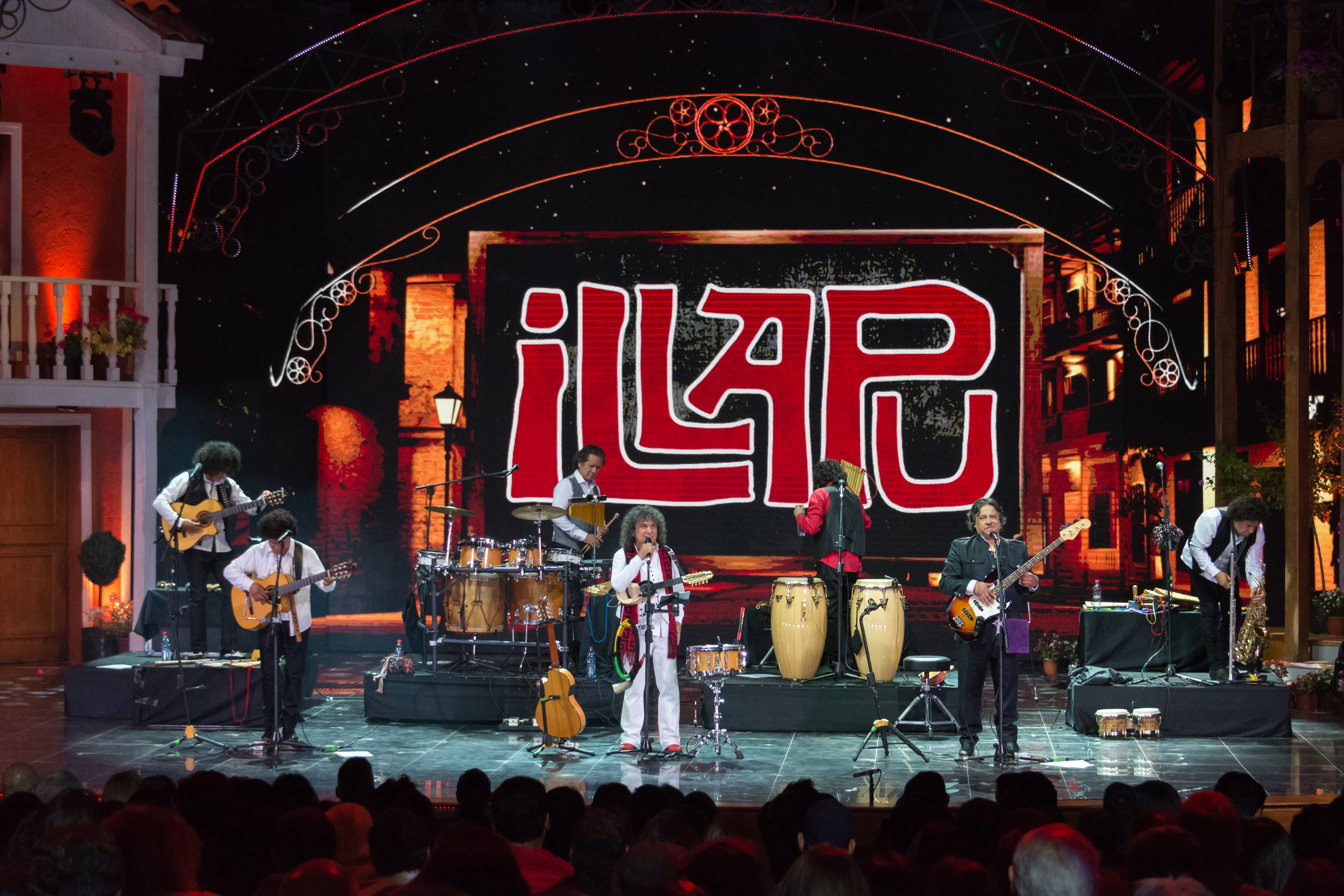

Background information
- Origin: Antofagasta, Chile
- Genres: Folk; Andean; Latin; protest music
- Years active: 1971–present
- Labels: EMI-Odeon; Warner Music; Monitor/Folkways
- Website: Official website

Illapu are a Chilean folk and Andean musical ensemble that was formed in 1971 in Antofagasta, in northern Chile, by the brothers José Miguel, Jaime, Andrés and Roberto Márquez Bugueño. A later addition to the group was Osvaldo Torres.

== Story ==
Illapu was formed in 1971 in the northern Chilean city of Antofagasta. Their name comes from the Quechua word meaning "Lightning Bolt". That same year they performed in the Festival del Salitre ("Saltpeter Festival") in María Elena, a mining town, and won the festival's prize after performing Quilapayún's "La Muralla". They were sharply criticized by the organiser of the musical event, Patricio Manns, for interpreting someone else's composition. That same year Pato Valdivia joined the ensemble.

In 1972 they moved to Santiago de Chile seeking more performance and recording opportunities. They recorded their first album, Música Andina, for the label DICAP. Shortly afterwards they won a prize at the Norte Andino Festival ("Andean North Festival") in Calama interpreting "Dale Mañungo", composed by the songwriter Nano Acevedo.

In 1973 they performed for the first time at the prestigious Festival Internacional de la Canción de Viña del Mar music festival. Their novel musical approach and aesthetics on stage gained them the recognition from music critics and praise from the general public. At this stage they began to be considered a new element in the Nueva Canción Chilena ("New Chilean Song") movement. The resources allocated to the arts and culture under the Popular Unity government of Salvador Allende also allowed Illapu to fully develop their artistic potential.

In 1981, because of the repression under the Pinochet regime, they were forced into exile – going first to France and later Mexico City. In 1988, due to the improved political climate, they returned to Chile. Their 1993 album En Estos Días, which contained the hit single "Lejos del Amor", won 7 platinum records.

== Discography ==
- Música Andina (1972)
- Chungará (1975)
- Despedida del pueblo (1976)
- Raza Brava (1977)
- Canto vivo (1978)
- Grito de la raza (1979)
- Theatre de la Ville (1980)
- El canto de Illapu (1981)
- Y es nuestra (1983)
- De libertad y amor (1984)
- Para seguir viviendo (1986)
- Divagaciones (1988)
- En vivo: Parque La Bandera (1988)
- Vuelvo amor... vuelvo vida (1991)
- En estos días (1993)
- De sueños y esperanzas (1994)
- Sereno (1994 or 95)
- Multitudes (1995)
- Morena esperanza (1998)
- Momentos vividos (2000)
- Antología 1971-1982 (2001)
- Illapu (2002)
- Vivir es mucho mas (2006)
- Vivo (2008)
- Con Sentido y Razón (2014)
- Antología Viva (2016)
