= Germán Casas =

Chilean singer

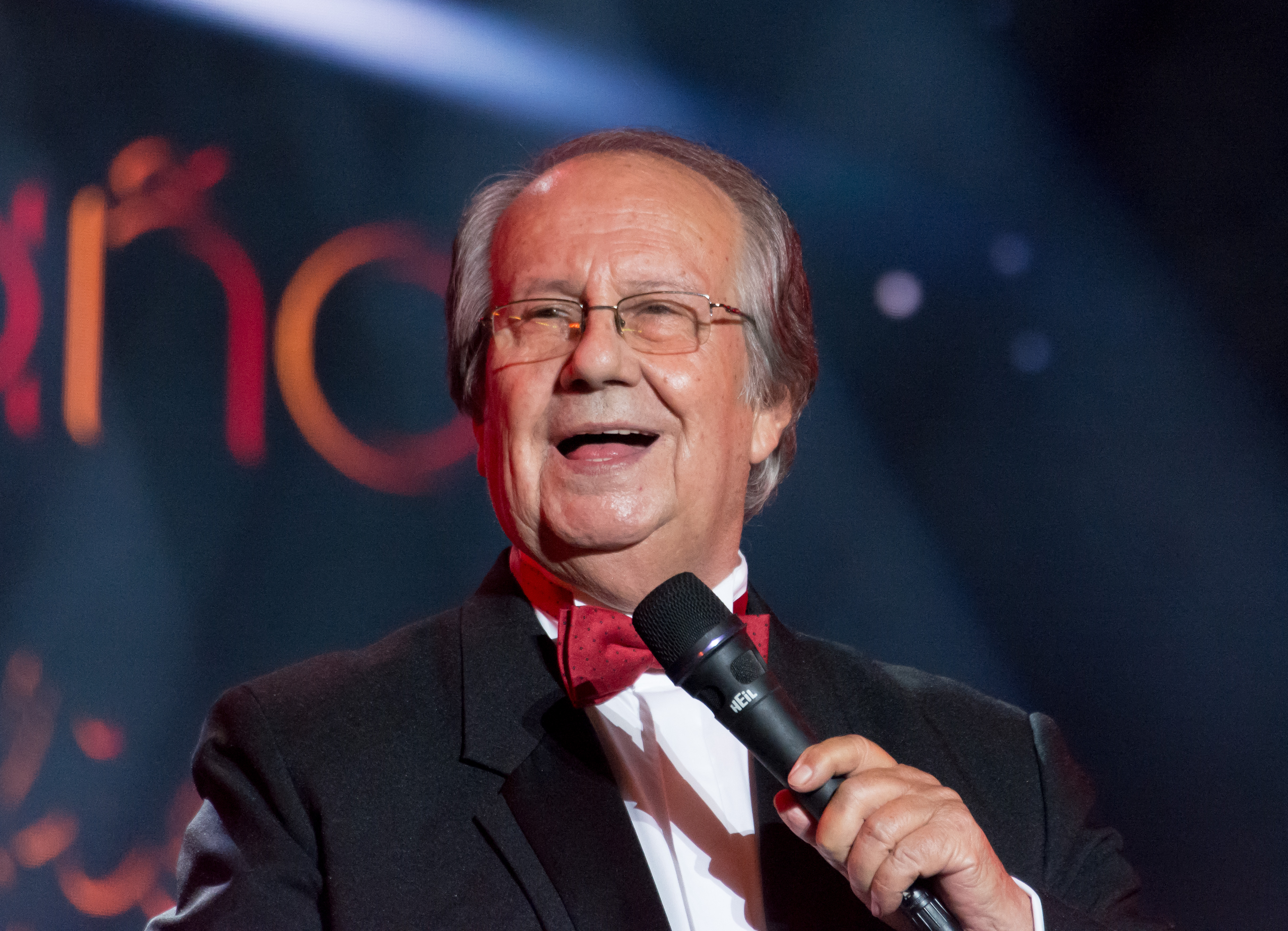
Germán Casas in 2020

German Casas (born May 27, 1939) is a Chilean singer.

== Brief bio ==
German Casas became famous during the 1960s and 1970s. Many of his songs hit Chilean airwaves and television, making him a household name all over his native country. He was one of Chile's best known rock and roll and twist musicians of the era. In 1967 Casas was named as one of the top five Chilean singers at the national popular music awards.

Some of his most famous songs are "Camina Derechito" ("Walk Straight"), "Rock del Mundial" ("Rock the World Cup"), and "Twist del Estudiante" ("Student's Twist").

Despite not having any major hits in decades, German Casas has continued touring around Chile, and to other South American countries. Many Chilean fans see him as a legend whose status is as big as that of Julio Iglesias, Elton John or Luis Miguel, for example.

In 2004, Casas was honored at a nationally televised event, for his forty years of work in Chilean show business.
