= Barrio Brasil =

Coordinates: 33°26′24″S 70°39′54″W

- Neighbourhood
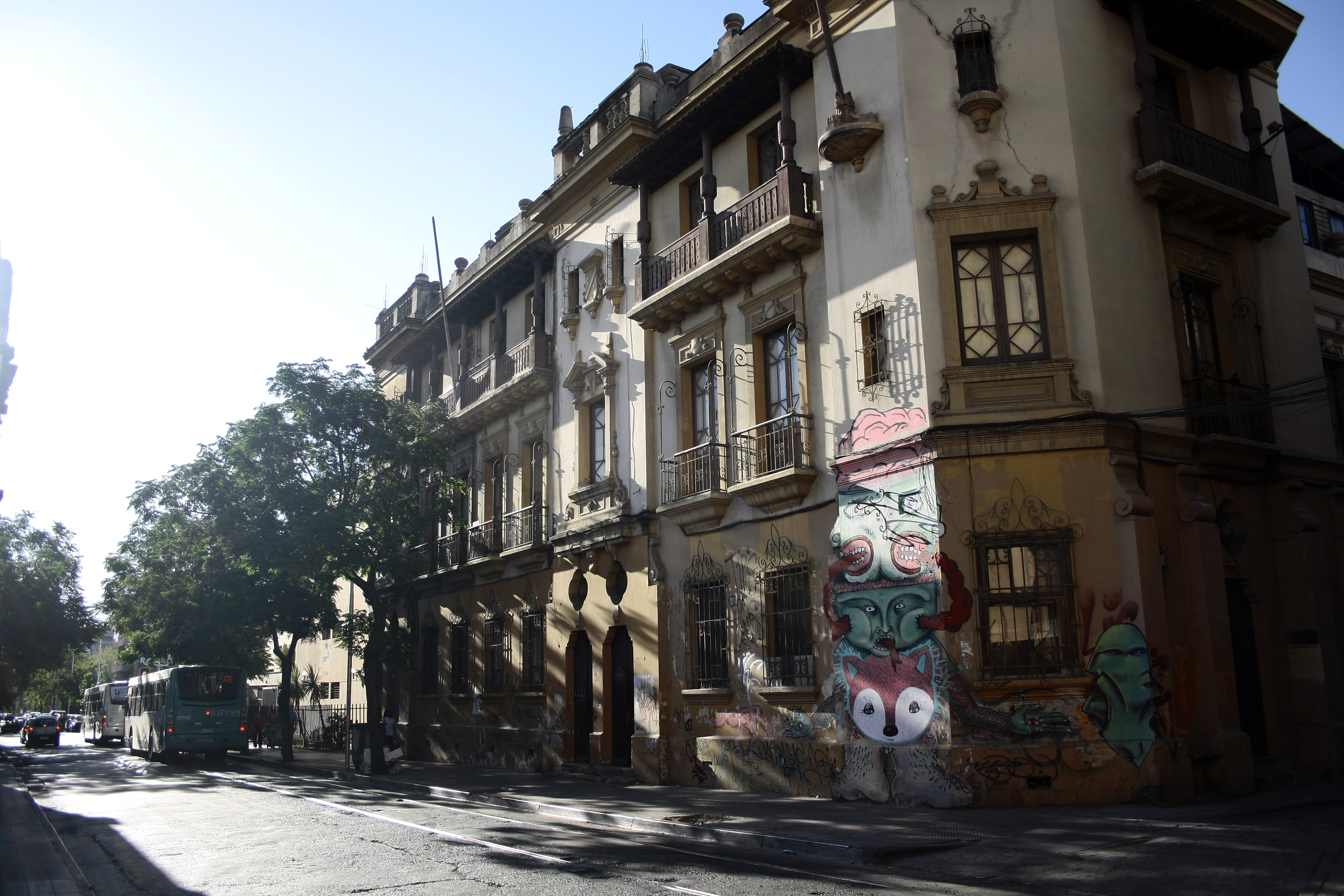
- Barrio Brasil street

- Location in Chile
- Country: Chile
- Region: Santiago Metro.
- Province: Santiago
- Elevation: 579 m (1,900 ft)
- Time zone: UTC-4 (CLT)
  - Summer (DST): UTC-3 (CLST)
- Website: Portal Barrio Santiago

Barrio Brasil is a neighborhood of Santiago, Chile, located to the west of the city center in the commune of Santiago and to the east of Barrio Yungay. Barrio Brasil is close to the neighborhoods Dieciocho, Concha y Toro, Yungay, and República and lies immediately to the north of the Alameda. Barrio Brasil is known for its strong cultural and artistic scene, featuring a number of bars, nightclubs and cultural venues.

== History ==
Barrio Brasil was a characteristic upper-class neighborhood in Chile's capital from the middle of the 18th century. A variety of interesting architectural styles can be seen in the neighborhood. Basílica del Salvador, at Huérfanos 1781, is a neo-gothic palace. There is a Haussmann-style building at Moneda y Ciénfuegos that today rents out studio space, and neoclassical Spanish-style casonas or large homes, as well as traditional Chilean housing.

Efforts to rebuild the neighborhood began after the 1985 earthquake. Since 2000, the neighborhood has experienced a revival with the creation of spaces for cultural events, the arts, recreation and leisure. It is also the site of new building projects that attempt to attract young middle-class families to the center of the city. Part of the architectural patrimony of the neighborhood has been renovated and the general quality of life of the sector has improved.

== Universities ==
The neighborhood is also home to numerous institutions of higher education including the School of Dance at the Brasil campus of the Academy of Christian Humanism University, and the Alberto Hurtado University. Some of the buildings comprising the Alberto Hurtado University feature German gothic architecture, for example, Cienfuegos 41.

== Social life ==
Avenida Brasil, which begins on the north side of the Alameda just past the metro República, has many cafés, restaurants, and bars. Plaza Brasil is a social and cultural landmark in the neighborhood.
