= La Mano Ajena =

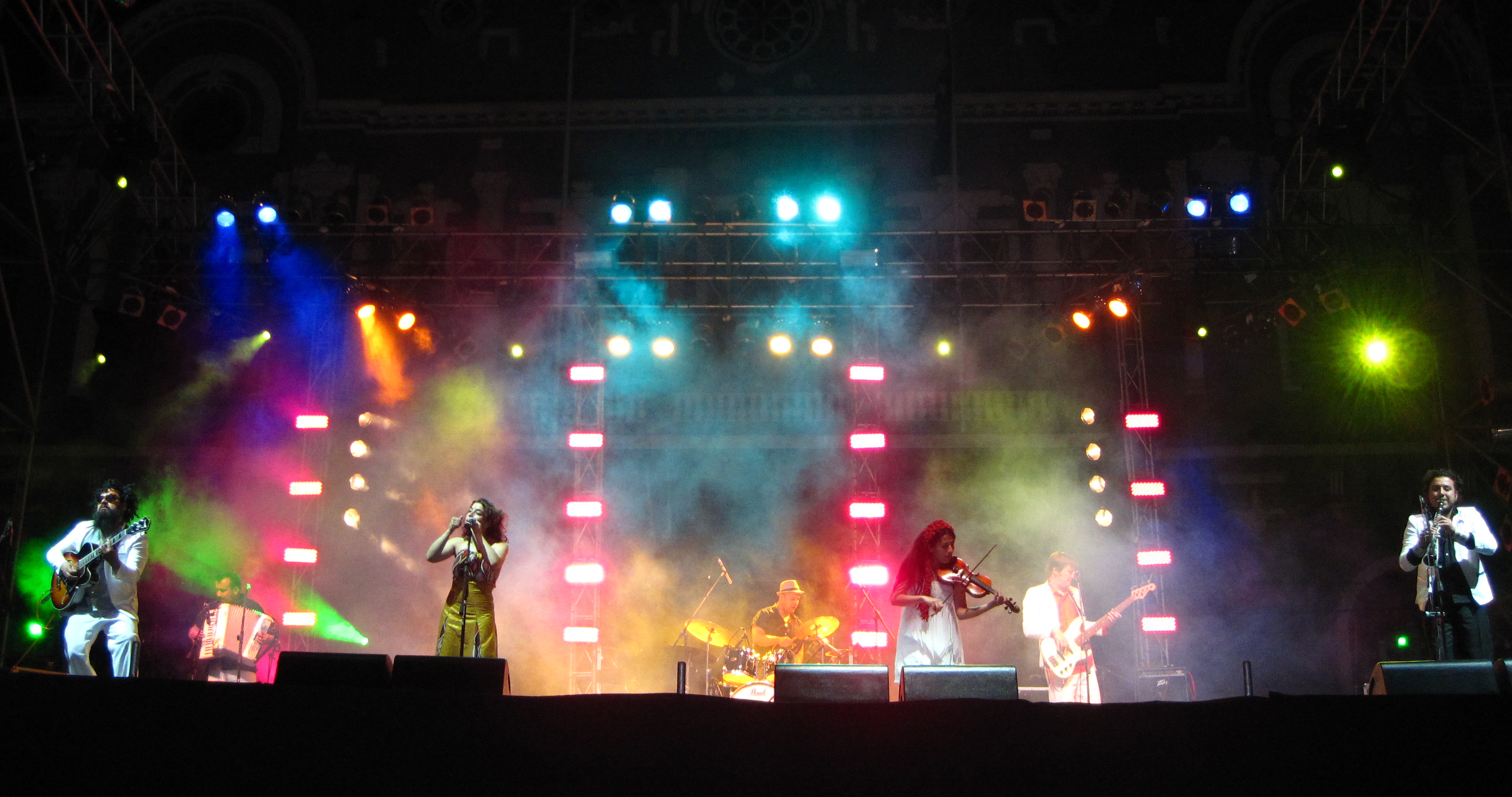

Background information
- Origin: Santiago, Chile
- Genres: World music, Klezmer, Cumbia, Gypsy music, Balkan music, Romani music
- Years active: 2002 - present (Santiago)
- Labels: Oveja Negra, Sello Oveja Negra
- Members: Rodrigo Latorre, María Fernanda Carrasco, Cristian Aqueveque, Gabriel Moyla, Álvaro Sáez, Danka Villanueva, Jair Moreno
- Past members: Joel Viera, Humberto Durán
- Website: http://www.lamanoajena.cl

La Mano Ajena is a Chilean band founded in 2002 that mixes rhythms from Eastern Europe, Latin America, France and Russia, blending all these sounds in a pastiche that also unites the tendencies of each member of the band: rock, punk, Latin American folklore and theater music. This musical project is unique in Chile, and its hybrid sound has been called "klezmer a la chilena" by press.

Its first references were Jazz manouche, Klezmer, Balkan and Gypsy music, rhythms to which later they would incorporate Latin influences like Cumbia, Mambo, Cha-cha-cha, Tango and Rumba; creating a cosmopolitan sonority. From its beginning, the band was a precursor in spreading the Gypsy, Balkan and Klezmer rhythms in Chilean stages; and today, after almost a decade, they are one of the most important and celebrated bands from the so-called “new culture of musical carnival” that has taken place in Chile in the last years.

La Mano Ajena has played in many stages abroad and inside of Chile, in countries as Denmark, Spain, Serbia and Argentina. In Santiago, they have shared stage with bands as Gogol Bordello and Emir Kusturica & The No Smoking Orchestra. In January, 2009, they became the first and only Latin American band to participate in the Küstendorf Film and Music Festival in Serbia, created by the twice Palme d'Or winner in Cannes and world famous filmmaker Emir Kusturica, whose band The No Smoking Orchestra is the main and most important reference concerning Balkan and Gypsy music in the world.

La Mano Ajena incorporates in its work a traditional repertoire sung in diverse languages: Gypsy language, Yiddish, Hebrew, French, English and Spanish. Its members are 8 multi-instrumentalists: Rodrigo Latorre, soprano saxophone, alto saxophone, baritone saxophone, guitar, piccolo flute, keyboard and theremin; María Fernanda Carrasco, vocals, keyboard, melodica and minor percussion; Danka Villanueva, violin and marimba; Gabriel Moyla, accordion, alto saxophone and baritone saxophone; Jair Moreno, clarinet; Álvaro Sáez, drums, darbuka and djembe; and Cristian Aqueveque, electric bass and double bass. Most of them have been part of important Chilean theater companies.

== Küstendorf Film and Music Festival 2009 ==
In 2008, the famous Serbian filmmaker Emir Kusturica and his No Smoking Orchestra asked La Mano Ajena to join them on stage during their show in Santiago, on October 13. During that occasion, the band was also invited to participate in the Kusturica's Küstendorf Film Festival 2009, annual event held in Mokra Gora, Serbia, where the Chilean musicians shared stage with bands like Haydamaky from Ukraine and Leb i Sol from Macedonia. They were the first Latin-American musicians to play in the music section in the festival.

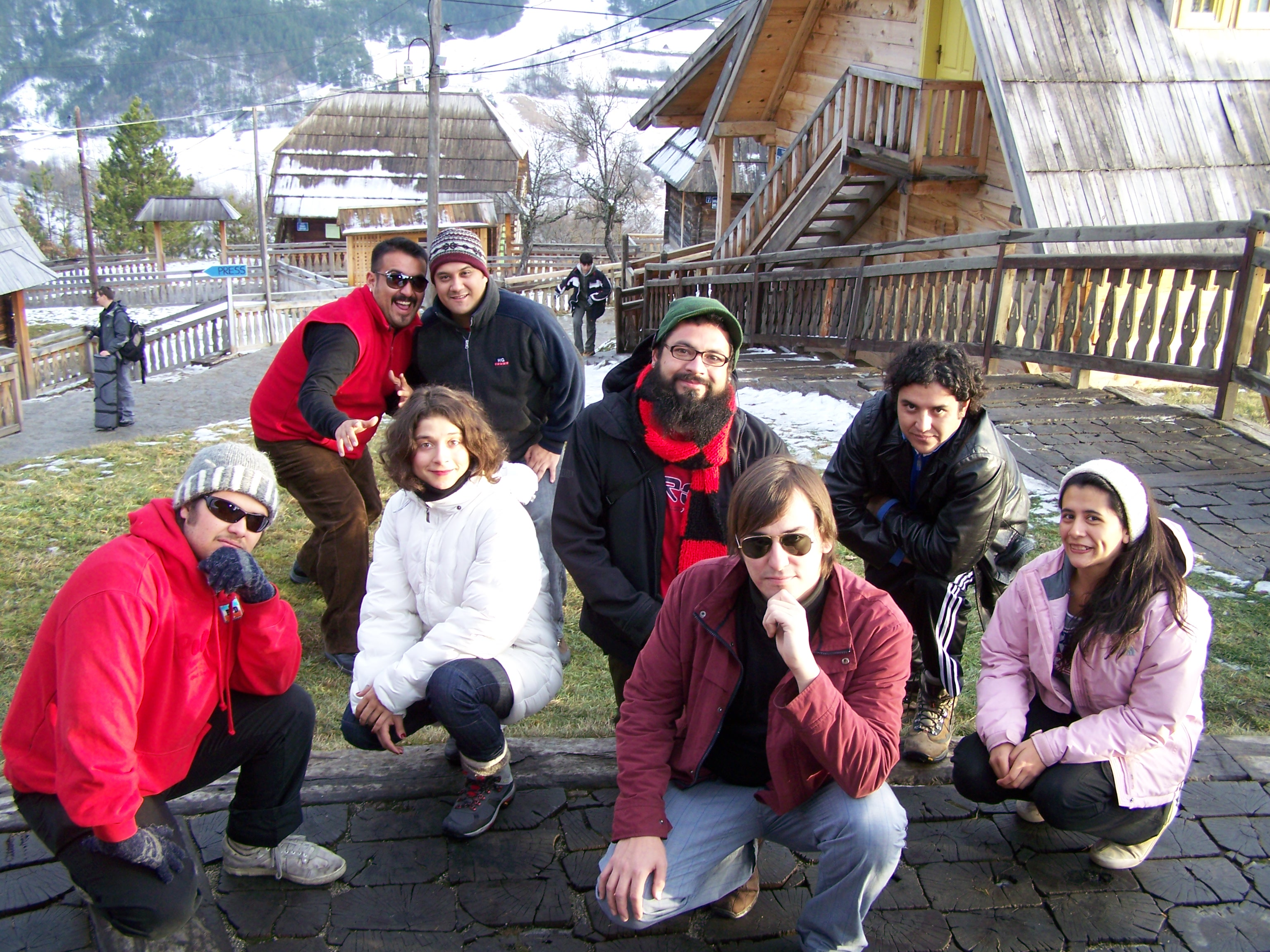
La Mano Ajena in Küstendorf, Serbia

The show given by La Mano Ajena was praised by some of the most important guests of the festival, like the American director Jim Jarmusch and Thierry Frémaux, head of Cannes Film Festival. Since then, there's a close bond of friendship and musical affinity between both groups. In February 2009, La Mano Ajena was invited once again to share stage with The No Smoking Orchestra during their 10th anniversary tour, in which they played in Viña del Mar, Chile. About the Chilean musicians, Kusturica said to local press that there's a “special connection” between both bands, while Nelle Karajlic, the singer and leader of the Serbian group, stated that in Serbia La Mano Ajena members were “heroes”.

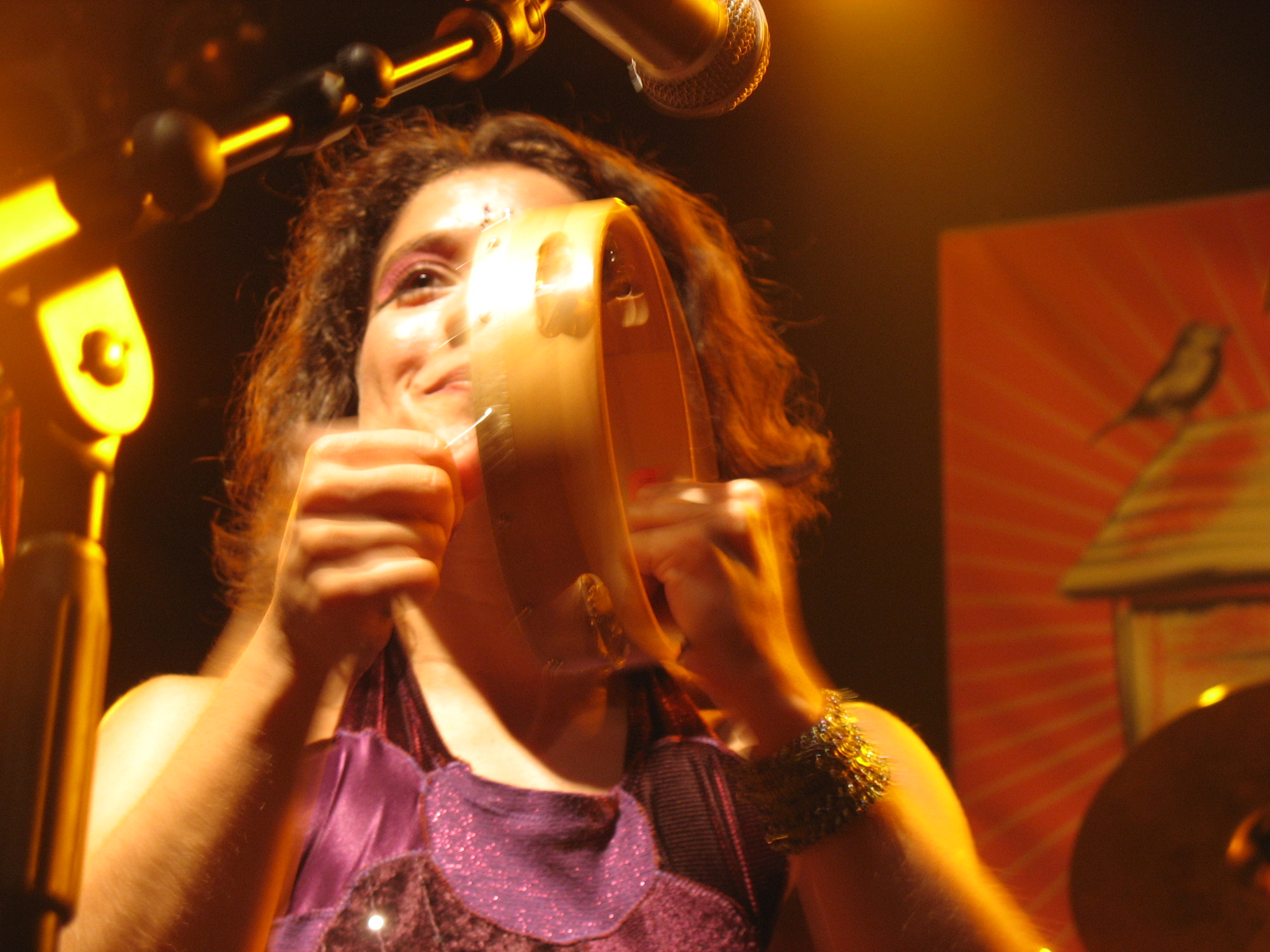
Singer Fernanda Carrasco on stage

== Past and present ==
During 2006 they went on their first European Tour, doing shows in several cities of Denmark and Spain. On that same year, their first album was released in Spain by the Fundación Autor record company. In 2008, on their second European tour, they played 19 times in different Danish cities.

In November 2009, La Mano Ajena opened the concert of the world famous New York gypsy punk band Gogol Bordello, on their first visit to Chile.

In Chile, they have played in some of the most important stages of the country, and their versatility has led them to create original music and songs for television shows. In 2009, they participated in “Leche para Haití” a charity concert created to raise funds for children in Haití; and they were part of the cultural program “Creando Chile en mi barrio” (“Creating Chile in my neighborhood”), organized by the Chilean Ministry of Culture, where, as a cultural delegation, they travelled around the country playing in different stages, recording new tracks, teaching lessons and sharing their experiences with new musicians and bands from different corners of Chile.

In 2010, they created the Music School Escuela Ajena, in which all the band members shared their musical knowledge with children, teenagers and adults. This idea was related to the band's interest for teaching to younger generations specially, and it was also a result of the musicians' social concerns.

La Mano Ajena is currently recording their third album in studio, a works that should be released by the end of 2011.

== Discography ==
- "La Mano Ajena" Sello Azul Records (2005)
- "Radio Galena" Sello Oveja Negra Records (2008)
- "Raza Quimera" Sello Oveja Negra Records (2011)
- "Exitos Imbailables" Independiente (2016)
