= Chico Trujillo =

Chilean cumbia group

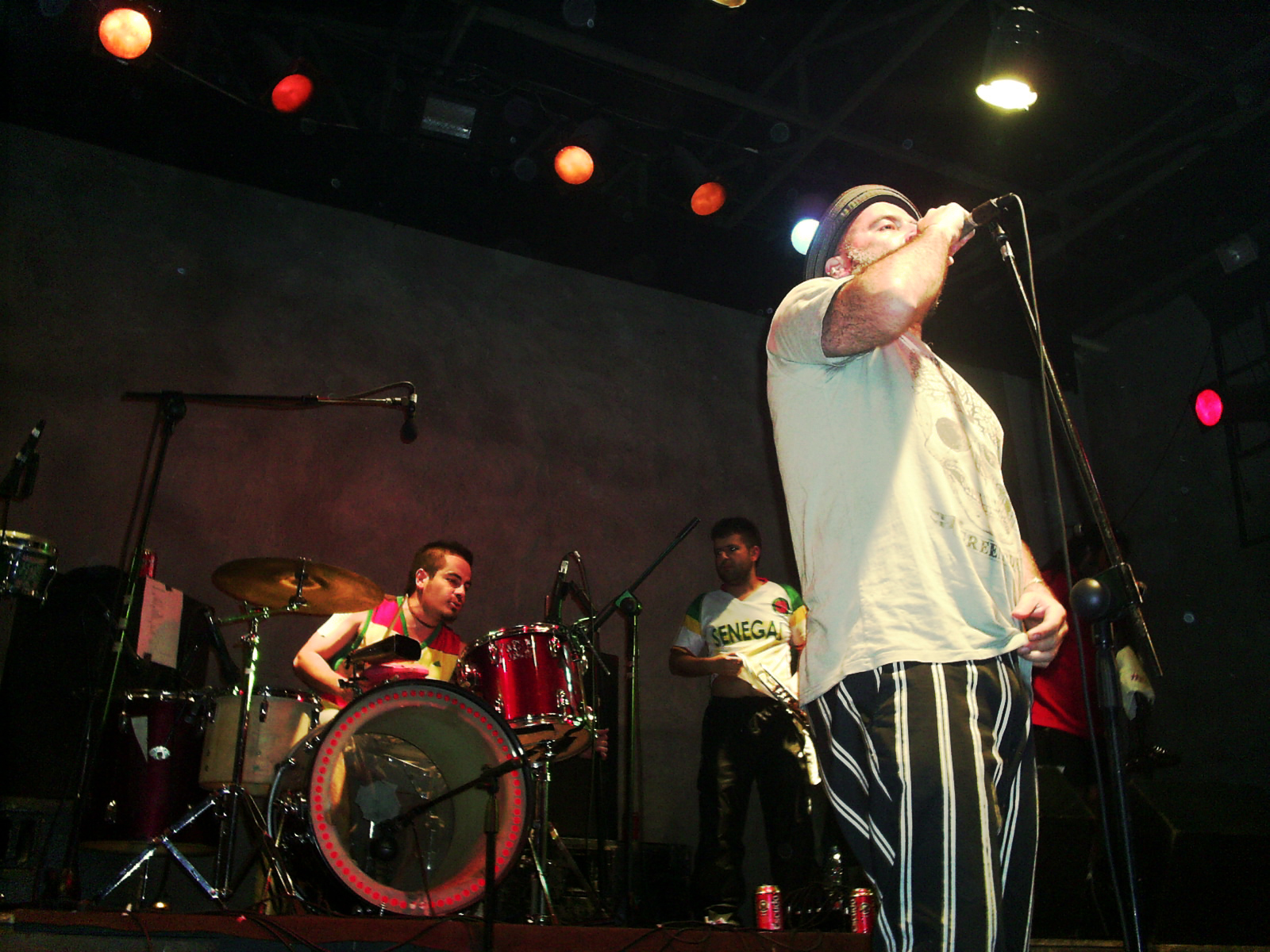
- Chico Trujillo at a 2008 concert

Background information
- Origin: Villa Alemana, Chile
- Genres: New cumbia, bolero, ska, reggae, rock
- Years active: 1999–present
- Members: Aldo Asenjo; Victor Vargas; Juan Gronemeyer; Sebastián Cabezas; Rodolfo Fuica; Luis Tabilo; Michael Magliochetti; Joselo Osses; Leo Ruiz
- Past members: Camilo Salinas; Ricardo Alvarez; Jose "Pepe Maikel" Barria
- Website: chicotrujillo.com

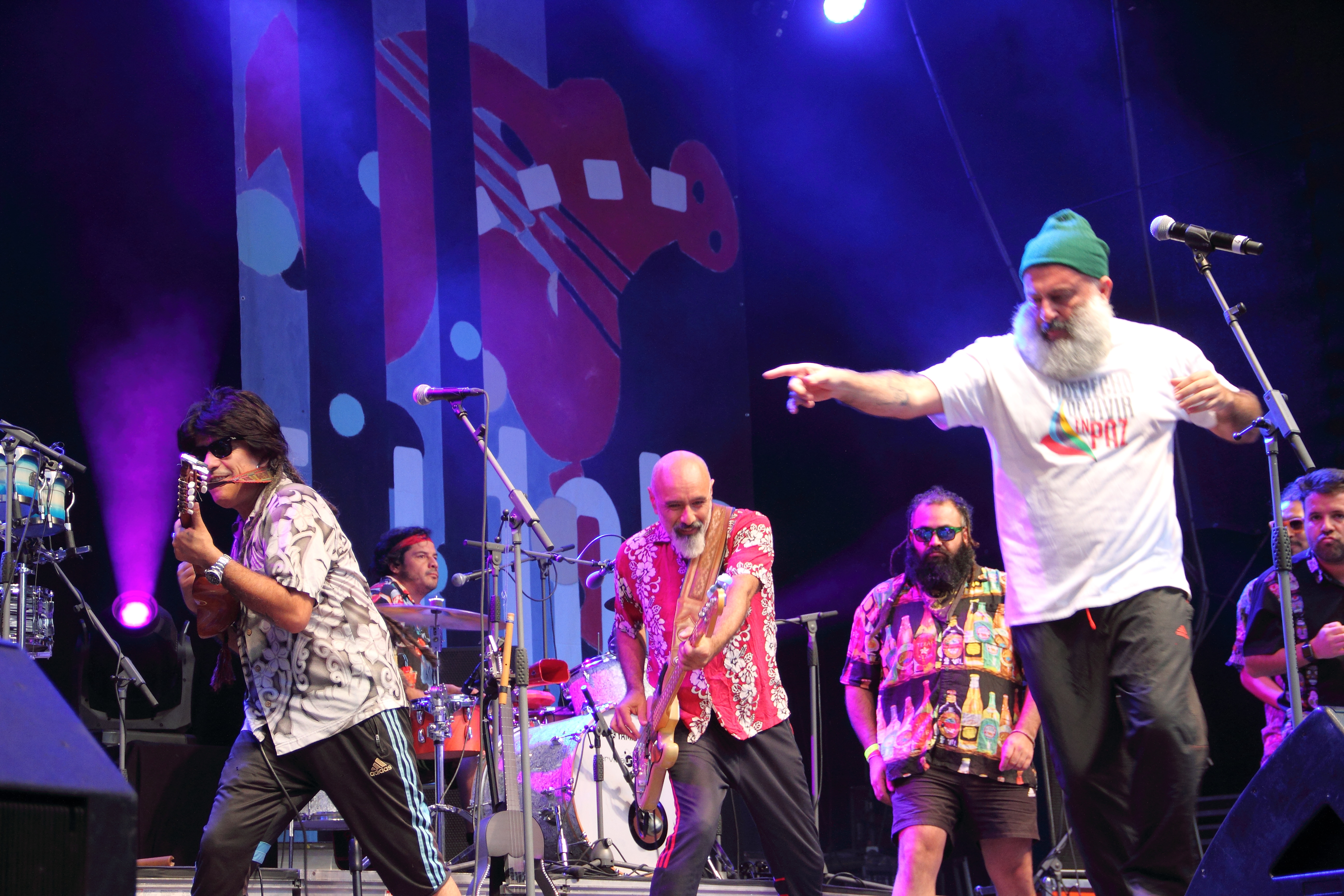
Chico Trujillo at Rudolstadt-Festival 2018

Chico Trujillo are a Chilean New cumbia band merging cumbia, ska, reggae and rock, among other styles.

The band formed in 1999 in Villa Alemana, Zona Central, Chile, following a tour that lead singer Aldo Asenjo – known as "Macha" – undertook with his then band La Floripondio through the cities of Germany, the Netherlands and Austria. Chico Trujillo's first songs were born of jamming sessions with Asenjo and his friend Antonio Orellana, and their sound gradually attracted new members to the band. This lineup led to their first album, Chico Trujillo y la Señora Imaginación, in 2001.

Chico Trujillo has performed concerts at universities, musical venues, festivals and various events, including the Cumbre Guachaca Chilena at Estación Mapocho and concerts campaigning for the rights of the indigenous Mapuche. They have also featured on the Lollapalooza music festival lineup in both Santiago and Chicago.

Chico Trujillo has also gained a considerable following in Europe, in particular Germany.

== Musical style and influences ==
Chico Trujillo mixes original songs with traditional cumbia, exploring styles as diverse as boleros and ska, Andean folk and hip hop, reggae and rock, in a popular live act. A post on The New York Times Artsbeat blog described Chico Trujillo's signature sound:

“Every party band needs a rhythm, and Aldo Asenjo, the band’s leader and singer, relies on cumbia, the beat heard in countless variations across Latin America. Cumbia often trots calmly, but Chico Trujillo’s version gallops, bounding along; now and then, the music switches into rumba, equally upbeat. Mr. Asenjo sings lyrics as chattery and percussive as some hip-hop, taking on the ups and downs of love and life, with his voice answered by chortling horns — did he borrow the arranging idea from ska bands? — and a tootling, circusy organ. Syncopation, momentum and a way of romping through pain — a party band needs them all, and Chico Trujillo has them.”

As they themselves explain, Chico Trujillo has "been able to mix pieces of the past with the global influence of alternative culture, bringing it all together under the Pan-American flag of the cumbia."

== Members ==
- Aldo Asenjo- Vocals
- Michael "Bendito" Magliocchetti – Vocals, Guitar
- Victor "Tuto" Vargas – Bass guitar
- Juanito Gronemeyer – Percussion, Drums
- Sebastián Cabezas "Zorrita" – Trumpet
- Rodolfo Fuica "Tio Rodi" – Percussion, Drums
- Luis Tabilo – Trombone
- Joselo Osses – Keyboard
- Leo Ruiz – Saxophone
- Felita – Saxophone
- Macha Asenjo – Guitar, Vocals

== Discography ==
=== Albums ===
- 2001: Chico Trujillo y la Señora Imaginación (released in Germany as Up the Ass!)
- 2003: Fiesta de reyes (live)
- 2007: Cumbia chilombiana
- 2008: Plato único bailable
- 2009: Chico de oro
- 2010: Vivito y coleando (live)
- 2012: El gran pecador
- 2015: Reina de todas las fiestas
- 2019: Mambo mundial

=== Singles ===
- Maria ria (2001)
- Y si no fuera (2001)
- El conductor (2006)
- Medallita (2006)
- La escoba (2006)
- Lanzaplatos! (2008)
- Loca (2008)
- Sin Excusas (2009)
- Gran Pecador (2009)
