= Copihue de Oro =

- Awarded for: Popular recognition in entertainment and show business
- Sponsored by: La Cuarta
- Country: Chile
- First award: 2005
- Website: www.copihuedeoro.cl

The Copihue de Oro is an award created by the Chilean newspaper La Cuarta to recognize figures from the world of entertainment and show business in that country. Its symbol is the flower of the species Lapageria rosea.

It has been granted by popular vote since 2005, and its presentation ceremony, normally held in December, is one of the main annual musical and television awards events held in Chile, along with the Altazor and the APES.

The 2011 Copihue de Oro was given in 23 categories, distributed among popular music, modeling, radio, and television in Chile. Over time, the number of categories has varied, reaching a high of 24 in 2013, falling to 18 in 2015.

== Categories ==
=== Music ===
- Established Singer (2005–2006)
- Young Singer (2005–2006)
- Musical Group (2005–2008)
- Ranchero Singer or Group (until 2013)
- Folk Singer or Group (until 2013)
- Tropical Singer or Group
- Male/Female Singer (2007–2009)
- Pop-Rock Singer or Group (2009–2015)
- Romantic Singer or Group (2010–2015)
- Popular Singer or Group (since 2016)

=== Variety ===
- Comedian/Humorist (until 2013)
- TV Model (2005–2012, 2014–2015)
- Queen of Copihue (2013, since 2016)
- Vedette (2005–2006)

=== Film ===
- Film (until 2013)
- Actor (2005–2010)
- Actress (2005–2010)

== Career awards ==
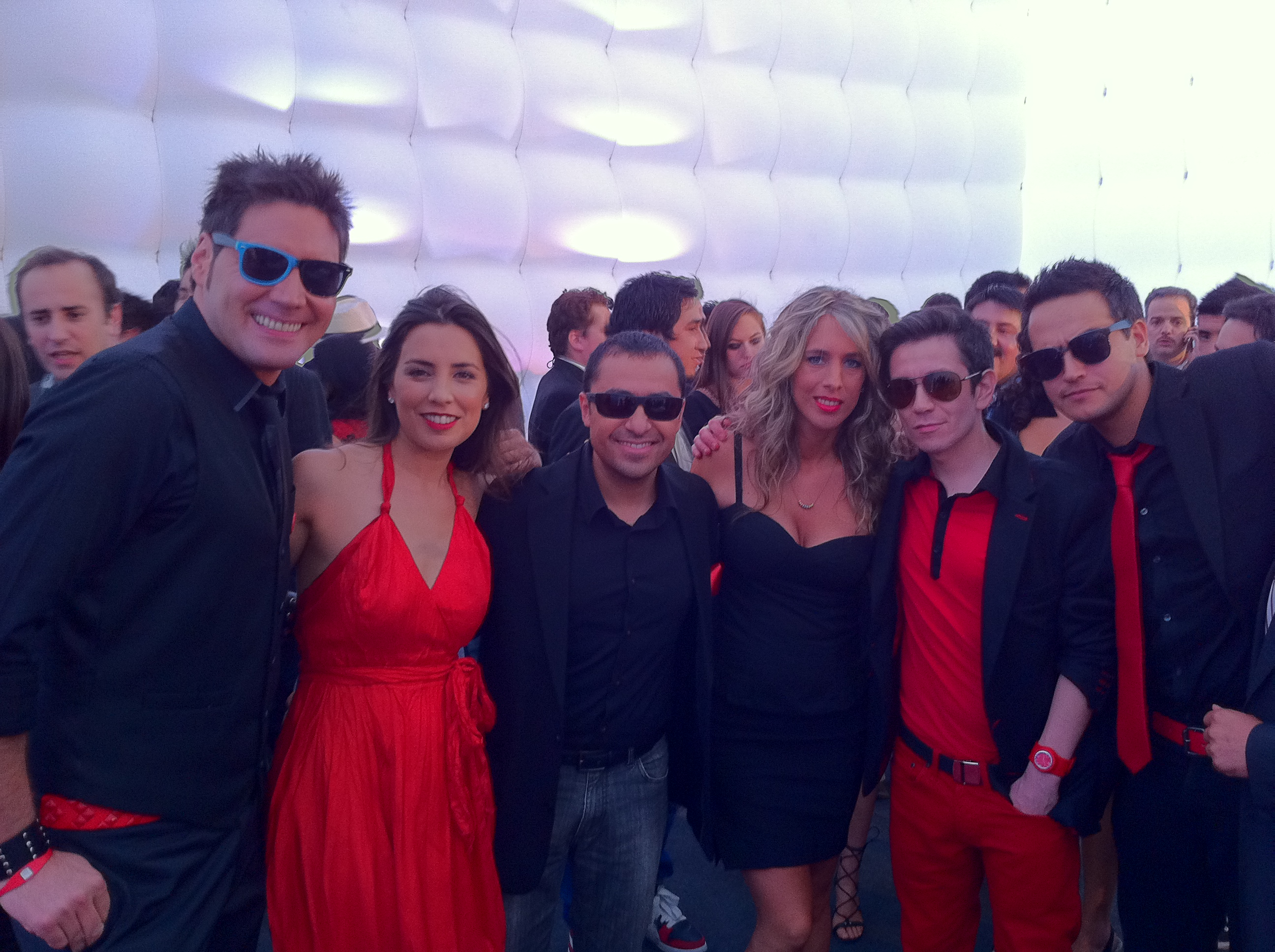
Red carpet at the 2011 ceremony, with Francisco Saavedra, Lucía López, Cristián Pérez, Paulina Rojas, Carlos Cisterna, and César Barrera

- 2005 – Palmenia Pizarro
- 2006 – Lucho Gatica
- 2007 – Coco Legrand
- 2008 – Antonio Vodanovic
- 2009 – Mario Kreutzberger
- 2010 – Patricio Zúñiga
- 2011 – Jorge Pedreros
- 2012 – Leo Caprile
- 2013 – Zalo Reyes
- 2014 – Peter Rock
- 2015 – Tachuela Chico
- 2016 – Cecilia
- 2017 – Jorge González
- 2018 – Valnetín Trujillo
- 2019 – Pedro Carcuro
- 2021 – Iván Arenas

== Hosts ==
Edition	Year	Hosts
1st	2005	Leo Caprile and Marlen Olivari
2nd	2006	Leo Caprile and Marlen Olivari
3rd	2007	Leo Caprile and María Eugenia Larraín
4th	2008	Leo Caprile and María Eugenia Larraín
5th	2009	Leo Caprile and María Eugenia Larraín
6th	2010	Leo Caprile and Soledad Onetto
7th	2011	Leo Caprile and Angélica Castro
8th	2012	Leo Caprile and Marion Cabrera
9th	2013	Leo Caprile, Claudia Conserva, Rafael Araneda, and Pamela Díaz
10th	2014	Karen Doggenweiler, Martín Cárcamo, Carolina de Moras, and Luis Jara
11th	2015	Diana Bolocco, Ignacio Gutiérrez, Katherine Salosny, and Gonzalo Ramírez
12th	2016	Javiera Contador, Francisco Saavedra, Ivette Vergara, and Julio César Rodríguez
13th	2017	Carolina Arregui, Felipe Vidal, Tonka Tomicic, and Karol Lucero
14th	2018	Monserrat Álvarez, Julián Elfenbein, José Miguel Viñuela, María Luisa Godoy, Daniel Fuenzalida, and Alejandra Valle

== Records ==
=== Most awards won ===
- 9: Luis Jara: Established Singer (2005, 2006), Best Male Singer (2007), Best Romantic Singer (2010, 2012, 2013), and Best Host (2013, 2014, 2015)
- 7: Tonka Tomicic: Best Host (2006, 2007, 2008, 2009, 2013, 2016, 2017)
- 7: Buenos Días a Todos: Best Morning Program (2005, 2006, 2007, 2008, 2009, 2010, 2011)

=== Most awards won in different categories ===
- Luis Jara: Established Singer (2005, 2006), Best Male Singer (2007), Best Romantic Singer (2010, 2012, 2013), and Best Host (2013, 2014, 2015)

=== Youngest winner ===
- Belén Soto: Best Actress (2007), age 10

=== Most awards won by a male artist ===
- 9: Luis Jara: Established Singer (2005, 2006), Best Male Singer (2007), Best Romantic Singer (2010, 2012, 2013), and Best Host (2013, 2014, 2015)
- 6: Felipe Camiroaga: Best Host (2006, 2007, 2008, 2009, 2010, 2011 – posthumous)
- 6: Willy Sabor: Best Radio Broadcaster (2005, 2006, 2007, 2009, 2010, 2011)

=== Most awards won by a female artist ===
- 7: Tonka Tomicic: Best Host (2006, 2007, 2008, 2009, 2013, 2016, 2017)

=== Most awards won by a group ===
- 6: Los Jaivas: Best Folk Music Group (2008, 2009, 2010, 2011, 2012, 2013)

== Controversies ==
- In 2009, Rafael Araneda was involved in a confusing incident when it was discovered that one of his employees, Rogelio Rojas, had purchased a significant number of votes in the election for Best Host. When the story broke, Araneda publicly apologized and returned the award.
- On occasion, some winners have been booed during the presentation of the Copihue de Oro. Such was the case with Felipe Camiroaga, awarded as Best Host in 2010, whom the public blamed for the separation of Katherine Salosny from Buenos Días a Todos. A similar situation occurred with the Best Host of 2016, Luis Jara, who was booed after the departure of journalist Álvaro Sanhueza from the morning show Mucho gusto.
