= Metrópolis =

Defunct Chilean cable operator

Metrópolis (previously known as Metrópolis Intercom) was a Chilean cable television operator that currently operates under the name VTR, after the merger of the 2 cable operators (Metrópolis Intercom and VTR Cablexpress) in July 2005.

== History ==
=== TV Cable Intercom (1987-1995) ===
On May 2, 1984, the Undersecretariat of Telecommunications authorized Comunicaciones Intercom Ltda. to start the first cable television service in Chile. It began broadcasting on May 17, 1987, when the military dictatorship authorized El Mercurio S.A.P. to operate the first concession for cable television in Chile. This is how the company created TV Cable Intercom. Although the group had the name of the company signed since 1981, it was in 1987 that cable television began as a pilot experience, that is, a trial period when it decided to lay cables to 300 homes in the commune of Providencia, in the eastern sector of Santiago, specifically in the sector comprising El Bosque, Tobalaba and Bilbao avenues. These homes enjoyed this new system free of charge for three months, with prior authorization from their owners.

During its existence, Intercom created a series of channels available exclusively on its own network:

1987:

- Cable Familia: Kids channel (until 1992)
- Cable Noticias: News channel (until 1989)
- Cable Económicos: Business channel (until 1989)
- Cable Cine: Movie channel.

1991:

- Cable Clip: Music channel (hasta 1994)
- Cable Programación: Schedule information.

1992:

- ARTV: Cultural channel (still on air).
- Cable Amigo: Kids channel (until 1994)

1993:

- Plaza Mayor Televisión: Local channel for Santiago.

1994:

- Congreso Nacional: Coverage of the National Congress of Chile.

1995:

- Vía X: Music channel (still on air).
- Telescuela: Educational channel.
- Cable Deportes: Sports channel.
- Wurlitzer: Music channel (channel 99).
- Universidad Católica de Chile Televisión Señal 3: Cultural channel (now known as 13C).
- Teleplay: Interactive services channel.
- Bolsa Electrónica de Chile: Business channel.
- Telekids: Kids channel (previously Plaza Mayor Monitos).

In its beginnings, Intercom's headquarters (head-end) was located on Avenida Francisco Bilbao in Providencia, but after terrorists set fire to said premises in mid-1989, they moved on October 24, 1990, to their new premises on Avda. Santa María 5542, Vitacura, inside the offices of the newspaper El Mercurio. These premises were used for the production and transmission of their respective channels, of which the production companies sent videotapes to the headquarters in order to transmit their programming. Although this form of transmission stopped between 1996 and 1997 thanks to fiber optics and the opportunity for direct transmissions from the channels' studios to reach the headquarters to their respective homes, the operations center would function until its merger with VTR in June 2005.

In 1989, Intercom implemented a service designed to provide its customers with permanent access to Satellite Television programming, first with ESPN (channel 10) and then with CNN International (channel 6). Thus, starting in 1991, pay television began to develop significantly; That same year, as of November 1, new channels ECO (channel 8) and RAI (channel 14) were added, while in December Channel 33 was incorporated, intended for a teletext service from El Mercurio.

In mid-1994, El Mercurio S.A.P. transfers 80% of the company's shares to the Chilean Telephone Company (CTC). The phone company paid $55 million, while the Edwards family company took 20%. In this way, they enabled bill payment services in their offices of the Spanish company Telefónica.

During 1995, Intercom moved its headquarters and payment address to Avenida Manquehue Sur 520, Las Condes (same place that it had been for 10 years with the merger of Metrópolis, and which was later occupied by VTR for the editorial direction of Vive!) Magazine, however the headquarters located in the offices of El Mercurio continued to function.

Thanks to its union with CTC, Intercom began its coverage of cable television services, first in Rancagua. It implemented the Inter@ctiva service, an online information system where they offered access to more than 60,000 computer programs, email, computer purchases and access to classified ads. In addition, the number of telephone lines and operators to receive requests was expanded, acquiring an automatic audio response system, among others. Access to 60 channels has also been implemented thanks to fiber optics with maximum image and audio clarity, which continued after the merger with Metrópolis.

In addition, Intercom's PAÍS project was completed, which not only covered Rancagua, but also included its service to the city of Iquique, after acquiring the cable operator Multicable. Several cities such as Temuco, Coquimbo, La Serena, Concepción, Talcahuano, Viña del Mar and Valparaíso were going to be integrated into this network. However, after the merger of Metrópolis in 1996, coverage expanded only in Temuco, Viña del Mar and Valparaíso. This agreement was not carried out in the aforementioned cities.

=== Metrópolis Televisión por Cable (1991-1995) ===
In 1991, Santiago Televisión por Cable was born, known commercially as Metrópolis Televisión por Cable, which at that time belonged to the Argentine channel Telefe, also included in its channel lineup. Like Intercom, Metrópolis began its operations in the south-east and west sector of Santiago, with different channels of its own.

1991:

- Cable Noticias: News channel.
- Metropolito: kids channel (hasta 1993)

1993:

- Cable Ofertas: Advertising channel (until 1995 on Metrópolis and 1997 on VTR Cablexpress).
- Cable Servicio: Customer information channel.
- K25 Televisión: Music and variety channel (until December 1996).

1995:

- Canal Ayudantías PAA: Educational channel.
- Metrokids: Kids channel.
- Metrocanal: Service channel.
- Ñuñoa Televisión Comunal: Local channel for Ñuñoa.

At the end of June 1994, Metrópolis was acquired by Cristalerías Chile and the company Hendaya S.A., agreed to invest 47,000 million and a half dollars in the pay television business. Later to Bresnan International Partners, to which he sold half of the shares. The property of the company, Cordillera Comunicaciones S.A. It remained at 50% for each of the parties. However, in 1995 it implemented the service of 60 fiber optic channels, like Intercom.

=== Metrópolis-Intercom (1996-2001) ===
In 1995, Metrópolis had acquired different cable operators in Chile, achieving coverage in seven cities, which allowed it to consolidate itself as the leader of cable television in the country. Metrópolis' investment at the time was the largest of Cristalerías Chile's cable television acquisitions, but not the only one. In July 1994, the company bought half of the shares of the company Temuco Cable Visión S.A., then acquired the entire company, and then sold a part to Bresnan. It has also acquired Sistemas Australes de Televisión S.A.

Thus, this cable operator partnered with Intercom S.A. at the end of 1995, and on January 1, 1996, the new Metrópolis-Intercom company was born. CTC (currently Movistar Chile) has participated in its ownership with 30%, Comunicaciones Cordillera S.A. (constituted by TCI, Cristalerías Chile and Bresnan International Partners) with 60% and El Mercurio S.A.P. with 10%.

The merger of both companies made it possible to develop a varied programming menu, where the best signals that they offered separately were selected, and which were joined to those that they shared.

On October 17, 1996, an interactive video game channel called Sega Channel began operating, which allowed full access to 25 games from the Sega company. At that time, Metrópolis-Intercom coverage reached the communes of Las Condes, La Reina, Peñalolén, Macul, Ñuñoa, Providencia, Vitacura, Lo Barnechea and several other communes. It was also promised to achieve national coverage, but this goal was not achieved.

The merged company produced the following channels:

Inherited from the separate companies:

- Cable Cine
- Cable Deportes
- Cable Noticias
- Vía X
- Wurlitzer: Music channel.
- K25 Televisión
- ARTV
- Metrokids
- Telescuela
- Universidad Católica de Chile Televisión Señal 3
- Teleplay
- Cable Programación: Schedule channel.
- Ñuñoa Televisión Comunal
- Bolsa Electrónica de Chile: Business channel.
- Congreso Nacional

1996:

- Etc...TV: Kids channel.

1997:

- Showbiz Televisión: Movie, series and sports channel (successor of Cable Cine)
- Zona Latina: Music channel.
- Club de Viajes: Travel channel.

1998:

- Fullcanal: Miscellaneous channel.

2000:

- Equus Sport: Horse racing channel (currently Teletrak TV).

For their part, there were also local channels with local programming and aired some of their own programs mixed with some programs from Showbiz, ARTV or Metrokids, these channels were the following:

- Iquique: The first local cable channel was called "Top Channel" (1992) by the Derpich brothers, when the company was called Multicable prior to its sale to CTC, then a third party, Javier Derpich Valdés, sublet a frequency to the municipality of Iquique with which RTC Televisión was born, the same year there was Más TV (1995), a channel with local programming produced by former professionals from Canal 12 and former Top Channel. Later, other channels such as Iquique Televisión arrive.
- Valparaíso: Cable Noticias.
- Rancagua y Rengo: Imagen Regional, TV Diario.
- Los Ángeles: Canal San Andrés.
- Temuco: Canal Local Frecuencia 24.
- Valdivia: ATV Valdivia.
- Puerto Montt, Puerto Varas y Llanquihue: Canales 5 y 24.

In September 1998, Metrópolis Intercom began operations of its Premium television service in Santiago and the Valparaíso Region, with 9 channels available.

In June 1999, Metropolis-Intercom implemented the Prime-Time service, a service that each movie channel presented movies in prime time (at 10:00 p.m.).

At the beginning of the year 2000, Metrópolis-Intercom was the only cable operator in Chile that offered the defunct sports channel PSN, through the "Basic" and "Premium" plans. This same channel presented various matches from the Korea-Japan 2002 World Cup Qualifiers live and exclusively.

In May 2000, CristalChile and Liberty Media bought 40% of Metrópolis-Intercom. The companies have bought in equal parts 40% of the cable TV company, held by Telefónica CTC Chile. The transaction involved a disbursement of US$270,000.

In August 2000, its digital television service launched with Pay Per View (PPV) services, an interactive programming and digital music guide. In addition, in November 2000 its Broadband Internet service began to operate.

=== Metrópolis (2001-2005) ===
By March 2002, Fox Sports Premium and Fox Sports Básico were launched.

By April 2003, Metrópolis' coverage continued to grow and reached San Felipe, Los Andes, Concepción, Talcahuano, Penco, San Pedro de la Paz and Chiguayante, through a network that had been installed six years ago.

During its last years, Metrópolis promoted the advertising concept of "Full Connection", which consisted of a service plan that included residential telephony, cable television, and broadband internet through its own networks or through Telefónica CTC Chile.

The termination of this cable operator occurred at the end of 2004, when the TDLC (Free Competition Court) accepted the merger of Metrópolis with its rival company, VTR. Metrópolis-Intercom became the property of VTR Banda Ancha S.A. Given this commercial merger, and due to the existing antitrust regulations in Chile, VTR had to transfer ownership of DirecTV Chile to the digital television network Sky Chile, while Telefónica CTC Chile created its own digital television division, after 2 years of agreement with the company Zap TV Satelital.

Metrópolis definitively ended its telephone, cable television and internet services on Thursday, June 30, 2005. All Metrópolis clients existing at the time of the company's closure became part of VTR.

== Criticism ==
Due to Ricardo Claro's links to conservative Catholic sectors of Chilean society, Metrópolis-Intercom carried out permanent censorship of different programs and blocked films, programs or commercial advertisements that were linked to sexual or violent themes or advertising linked to alcoholic beverages. This was noticeable in adult time slots and in sporting events such as the UEFA Champions League broadcast by ESPN, when the moment in which the Amstel beer advertisement was shown was "cut off" or when the content used to replace what was desired to be censored came in a different audio and sound quality, similar to that of the VHS format. This caused lawyers from the Party for Democracy to file a lawsuit against the company in 1999, in addition to the owners of channels such as HBO and Cinecanal suing to remove the channels from their grids if the company continued with the censorship of content. Due to this, the company was nicknamed Cartuchópolis-Censurón in Internet forums.
