= List of television stations in Chile =

List of television stations in Chile:

== Free-to-air terrestrial television stations ==
Logo	Channel name	Owner	Analog	Digital
	TV+	Media 23 SpA/PUCV (UCV)	5	29
	Canal 13	Luksic Group/Canal 13 S.A.	13	24
	Chilevisión	Vytal Group	11	30
	TVN	State of Chile	7	33
	Mega	Mega Media	9	27
	Mega 2	Mega Media	N/A	27
	La Red	Albavisión	4	28
	NTV	State of Chile	N/A	33
	UCV TV	Media 23 SpA/PUCV (UCV)	N/A	29
	TV Más 2	Media 23 SpA/PUCV (UCV)	N/A	29
	UChile TV	Universidad de Chile	N/A	30

== Subscription television stations ==
Logo	Channel name	Owner	Principles cable operators with pay								
Logo	Channel name	Owner	DirecTV	VTR	Entel	Claro	Movistar	TuVes	Gtd/Telsur	Mundo	Zapping
	ETC	2BeNamed		✓	✓	✓	✓	✓	✓	✓	✓
	Senpai TV			✓							✓
	Funbox	TV Azteca Internacional TV de Paga				✓			✓	✓	
	13C	Luksic Group/Canal 13 S.A.	✓	✓	✓	✓	✓		✓	✓	✓
	ARTV	TVI Filmocentro		✓		✓	✓		✓		
	Docu	TVI Filmocentro		✓			✓				
	Knino	2BeNamed		✓	✓	✓					
	Mega Ficción	Mega Media		✓	✓	✓	✓				✓
	Zona Latina	TVI Filmocentro		✓		✓	✓	✓	✓		✓
	Via X	TVI Filmocentro		✓		✓	✓	✓	✓		✓
	Via X 2	TVI Filmocentro				✓					
	Megatiempo	Mega Media			✓		✓			✓	✓
	TNE TV			✓							
	TVN3	State of Chile		✓		✓				✓	✓
	13Rec	Luksic Group/Canal 13 S.A.		✓	✓	✓	✓	✓	✓	✓	✓
	Chilevisión de Culto	Vytal Group			✓					✓	✓
	TVS	State of Chile		✓	✓	✓	✓		✓	✓	✓
	CDtv	State of Chile	✓	✓	✓	✓	✓		✓	✓	✓

== News channels ==
Logo	Channel Name	Owner	Digital	Principles cable operators with pay								
Logo	Channel Name	Owner	Digital	DirecTV	VTR	Entel	Claro	Movistar	TuVes	Gtd/Telsur	Mundo	Zapping
	CNN Chile	Carey Media Holdings	N/A	✓	✓	✓	✓	✓		✓	✓	✓
	Canal 24 Horas	State of Chile	N/A	✓	✓	✓	✓	✓	✓	✓	✓	✓
	T13 en Vivo	Luksic Group/Canal 13 S.A.	24	✓	✓	✓	✓	✓	✓	✓	✓	✓
	Canal CHV Noticias	Vytal Group	N/A	✓		✓		✓	✓	✓	✓	✓
	Meganoticias Ahora	Mega Media	N/A	✓		✓	✓	✓		✓	✓	✓
	Agricultura TV	Sociedad Nacional de Agricultura	N/A		✓		✓			✓	✓	✓
	DNews	Vrio Corp.	N/A	✓								

== Local channels (by region) ==
=== Santiago Metropolitan Region ===
Logo	Name	Owner	Analog Frequency	DTV
	Bío-Bío TV	Bío-Bío Comunicaciones	N/A	26.1
	TV Usach	Universidad de Santiago, Chile	N/A	50.1
	TVR	CNC Medios	N/A	14.1
	Tevex	Holding Advisor Financial Group	N/A	14.2
	FM Plus TV	CNC Medios	N/A	14.3
	La Sal TV	-	N/A	38.1
	15.1 BPB	Enlace Internacional	N/A	15.1
	Wapp TV	Wapp Mediagroup	N/A	38.2
	Suena TV	-	N/A	38.3
	Enlace	Enlace Internacional	50	35
	Nuevo Tiempo	Iglesia Adventista del Séptimo Día	25	40
	Turno	-	N/A	38.1
	Gracia TV	CGV Comunicaciones	N/A	38.3
	Señal 3 La Victoria	-	N/A	47

=== Arica y Parinacota Region ===
Logo	Name	Owner	Analog Frequency	DTV
	Arica TV	Arica TV S.A	12	N/A

=== Tarapacá Region ===
Logo	Name	Owner	Analog Frequency	DTV
	Hospicio Televisión	ASD Medios SpA	N/A	16.6
	Iquique Televisión	Iquique Television E.I.R.L.	N/A	25.1
	RTC Televisión	Ilustre Municipalidad de Iquique	N/A	26.1
	Tamarugal Televisión	N/A	N/A	N/A

=== Antofagasta Region ===
Logo	Name	Owner	Analog Frequency	DTV
	Antofagasta TV	Antofagasta TV S.A.	30	32
	VLP Televisión	VLP S.A.	N/A	N/A
	Digital Channel	Digital Channel S.A.	15	N/A
	Siete TV	Siete S.A.	7	N/A

=== Atacama Region ===
Logo	Name	Owner	Analog Frequency	DTV
	Holvoet TV	Holvoet S.A.	4	N/A
	STM	STM S.A.	N/A	N/A

=== Coquimbo Region ===
Logo	Name	Owner	Analog Frequency	DTV
	Andacollo Televisión	Andacollo Televisión S.A.	N/A	N/A
	TV2 Choapa	TV2 Choapa S.A.	2	N/A
	Thema Televisión	Sociedad Comercial TV Medios SpA	3	40
	Canal 4 TV	Canal 4 S.A	4	N/A

=== Valparaíso Region ===
Logo	Name	Owner	Analog Frequency	DTV
	Bohemia TV	Radio Bohemia	N/A	6.2
	QuintaVisión	Oliver y Compañía Limitada.	20	N/A
	Girovisual	Girovisual television S.A.	7	38.1
	Girovisual Solo Noticias	Girovisual television S.A.	N/A	38.2
	Girovisual Radio	Girovisual television S.A.	N/A	38.3
	Ritoque TV	César Ramos Silva	N/A	6.1
	Canal de la Costa	Cable de la Costa	N/A	N/A
	Valle Televisión	Valle Televisión S.A.	2	N/A
	Canal 2 San Antonio	Canal 2 San Antonio S.A.	2	2.1
	Mata O Te Rapa Nui	Municipalidad de Rapa Nui	N/A	13.1

=== O'Higgins Region ===
Logo	Name	Owner	Analog Frequency	DTV
	Canal 21	Canal 21 S.A.	21	N/A
	Los Ángeles Televisión	N/A	2	N/A
	Telecanal Santa Cruz	N/A	N/A	N/A

=== Maule Region ===
Logo	Name	Owner	Analog Frequency	DTV
	Canal 16	Altronix Ltda.	N/A	16
	Contivision	Television Contivisión Ltda.	N/A	25
	En Línea	Amiga Ltda.	6	6.1
	TV5 Linares	Comunicaciones del Sur Ltda.	5	5.1
	Universidad de Talca Televisión	Talca University	N/A	15

=== Biobío Region ===
Logo	Name	Owner	Analog Frequency	DTV
	Canal 9 Regional	Bio Bio Comunicaciones.	9	25
	TV8	TV8 S.A.	8	N/A
	El 3 de Conce	N/A	N/A	40
	NCC TV	NCC S.A.	4	N/A
	TVU	Holding Octava Comunicaciones S.A.	11	51

=== Araucanía Region ===
Logo	Name	Owner	Analog Frequency	DTV
	Autónoma Televisión	U. Autónoma Chile Televisión.	2	28
	Pucón TV	Pucón TV S.A	5	N/A

=== Los Ríos Region ===
Logo	Name	Owner	Analog Frequency	Cable Frequency
	ATV	ATV S.A.	N/A	11

=== Los Lagos Region ===
Logo	Name	Owner	Analog Frequency	DTV
	Canal 5	Canal 5 S.A.	78	N/A
	Vértice TV	N/A	N/A	49.1
	TVA	TVA de Ancud S.A	4	N/A
	Telesur Aysen	Telesur S.A.	3	N/A
	Televisión Escolar Allakintuy	TV Allakintuy S.A.	N/A	N/A
	TV8	TV8 S.A.	8	N/A

=== Magallanes Region ===
Logo	Name	Owner	Analog Frequency	DTV
	ITV Patagonia	ITV S.A.	11	32
	Pingüino TV	Patagónica Publicaciones S.A.	4	N/A
	Polar TV	Polar TV S.A.	2	N/A
	Universidad de Magallanes Televisión	N/A	N/A	N/A

== See also ==
- Television in Chile
- Media of Chile
