= Cristián Sánchez (presenter) =

Chilean journalist and television presenter

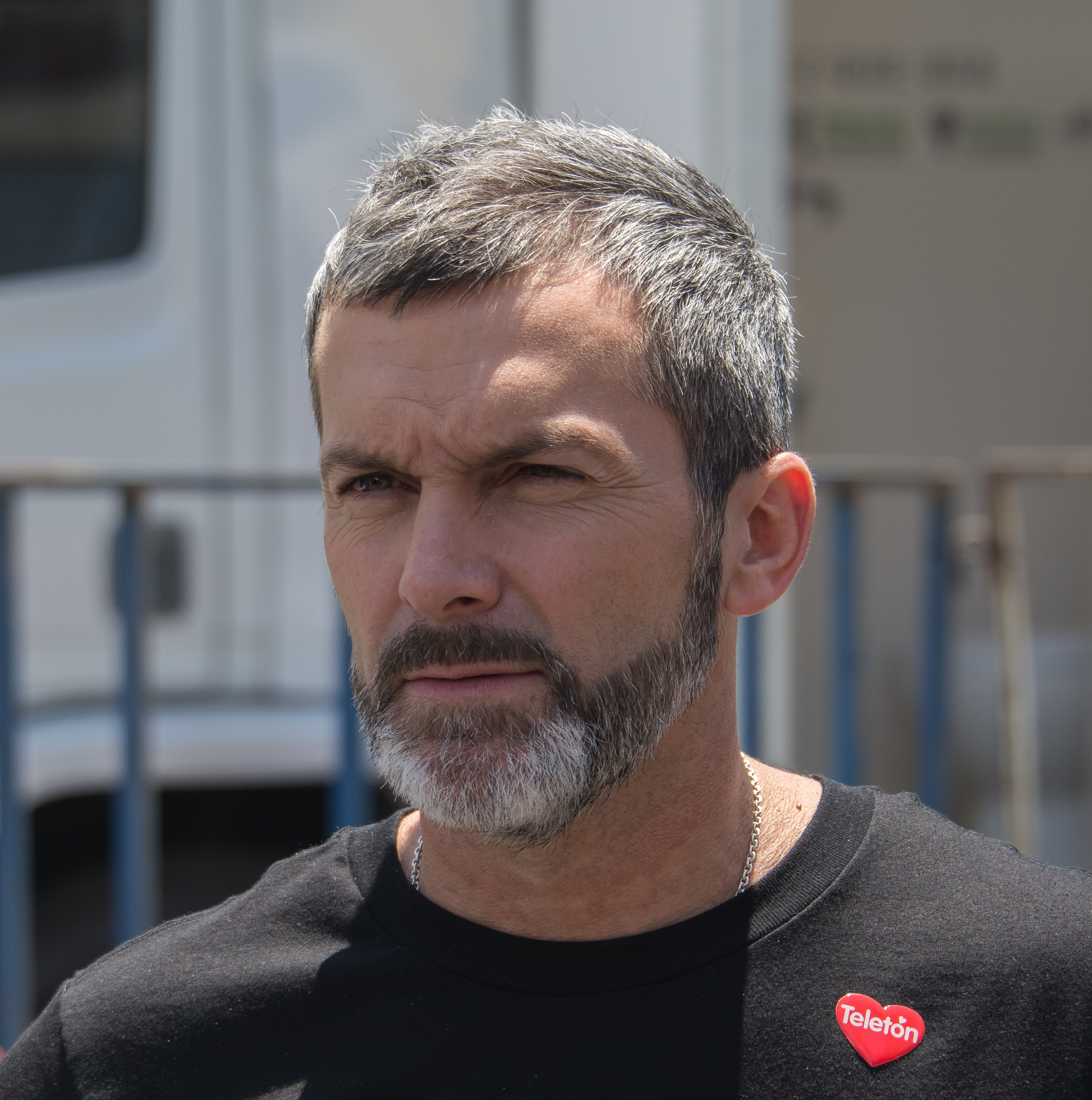
- Born: Cristián Arturo Sánchez Barceló; 29 May 1972 (age 54); Concepción, Chile
- Occupations: Journalist; Television host
- Years active: 1995-present
- Height: 1.74 m (5 ft 9 in)
- Spouse: Diana Bolocco (m. 2013)
- Partner(s): Bárbara Rebolledo (2003-2004); Diana Bolocco (2007-2013)
- Children: Facundo Sánchez; Gracia Sánchez
- Parent(s): Jaime Sánchez Arriagada; Rosa Barceló Rozas
- Relatives: Cecilia Bolocco (sister-in-law)

Cristián Arturo Sánchez Barceló (born 29 May 1972, Concepción) is a Chilean journalist and television presenter.

== Personal life ==
Sánchez is married to Diana Bolocco, a Chilean journalist and TV presenter who is the younger sister of Cecilia Bolocco, the Miss Universe 1987, and the mother of Pedro Cisternas, a professional footballer.

He is the second of seven brothers: Matías, the eldest; José Manuel or Coto; Jaime, a psychologist who also works in TV; Aníbal, deceased in 2021; Felipe or Pipe, a businessman who also worked in TV, and Juan Pablo.

A well-known supporter of Colo-Colo, he was a youth football player for Cobresal in 1989. He has stated that he dreamed of being a professional footballer, so when he joined the TV program ESPN Nexo, later ESPN FShow, where he works as a presenter and sports commentator, he returned to his roots, since he had also worked as a sports journalist in his early TV career.

== Filmography ==
=== Television ===
Year	Programme	Role	Channel
1991–1995		Sports reporter	Megavisión
1996		Sports reporter	Cable Deportes
2000	Pantalla abierta	Presenter	Canal 13
2003	ADN: Artistas en Nacimiento	Presenter	Canal 13
2004-2005	Viva la mañana	Presenter	Canal 13
2005-2008	Alfombra roja	Presenter	Canal 13
2008	Juntos, el show de la mañana	Presenter	Canal 13
2009–2012	SQP	Presenter	Chilevisión
2010	Combate estelar	Presenter	Chilevisión
2012	Fiebre de baile V	Presenter	Chilevisión
2012-2013	La mañana de Chilevisión	Presenter	Chilevisión
2012	Talento chileno	Backstage presenter	Chilevisión
2012	Amazonas	Presenter	Chilevisión
2013	XLIV Festival del Huaso de Olmué	Presenter	Chilevisión
2013	Baila! Al ritmo de un sueño	Presenter	Chilevisión
2013	Killer Karaoke	Presenter	Chilevisión
2014–2015	SQP	Presenter	Chilevisión
2016	Por ti	Presenter	TVN
2016–2019	Muy buenos días	Presenter	TVN
2017–2021	ESPN Nexo	Presenter	ESPN Chile
2021–Present	ESPN FShow	Presenter	ESPN Chile
2022–Present	La puerta millonaria	Presenter	Canal 13

=== Cinema ===
Year	Film	Role	Director
2012	Stefan v/s Kramer	Himself - Cameo	Stefan Kramer, Sebastián Freund and Eduardo Prieto
