= Katherine Salosny =

Chilean actress and television presenter (born 1964)

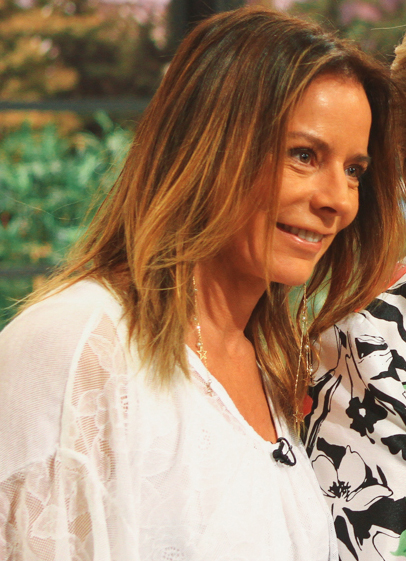
- Katherine Salosny in 2013
- Born: Katherine Estrella Salosny Reyes; 8 April 1964 (age 62); Santiago, Chile
- Occupations: Actress, TV presenter
- Years active: 1984–present
- Employers: Chilevisión (1985–1991, 1994); Canal 13 (2002); TVN (1991–1993, 1998–2000, 2003–2013, 2018–present); Mega (2013–2018)
- Awards: Copihue de Oro (2010, 2014, 2015)

Katherine Estrella Salosny Reyes (born 8 April 1964) is a Chilean actress and television presenter.

== Early years ==
As a child, Katherine Salosny lived with her mother in Mendoza, Argentina. She returned to Chile in her adolescence and attended Redland School for her primary and secondary education.

== Television presenter ==
=== 1980s and 1990s ===
In 1984 Salosny was working as a supermarket promoter, when in September she was cast as the face of the "Pepsi Challenge" campaign. After her advertising debut, in March 1985 she was hired by Universidad de Chile Televisión (Channel 11, now Chilevisión), where she had her television premiere on the program Extra-mujeres, on which she had a youth segment.

Salosny's segment was so successful that it was spun off into a new program, Extra jóvenes, of which she was the sole presenter until 1990, when Felipe Camiroaga joined as co-host. During those years, she was a participant in the campaign for the 1988 plebiscite, supporting the "Yes" option that proposed to keep General Augusto Pinochet in power until 1997, appearing in the electoral slot chapter corresponding to 26 September. After leaving Extra jóvenes in 1991, she moved to Televisión Nacional de Chile (TVN), appearing mainly on Ene TV and participating in some of the station's other programs.

Due to a lack of projects for her in 1993, she decided to return to Chilevisión for a morning show with Juan Guillermo Vivado and actor Felipe Izquierdo. In turn, she took charge of the show El baile. These two programs did not achieve high ratings, and Katherine Salosny disappeared from television until 1998, when she returned on Canal 2 Rock & Pop to make one of the first Chilean docu-reality shows, Taxi.

=== Return to TVN ===
In 2007, she returned to the media as a panelist on TVN's Buenos Días a Todos and, due to her favorable reception, she was hired to present the program Pasiones in February 2008, during Bárbara Rebolledo's vacation.

In 2009, she debuted an evening program called Digan lo que digan together with the renowned psychologist Pilar Sordo, but it did not receive high ratings and was quickly canceled. Later that year, she hosted the reality show Pelotón before the departure of Karen Doggenweiler, but this lasted only a few days since Tonka Tomicic left Buenos Días a Todo to go to Canal 13.

In late 2010, Salosny had a controversial exit from the morning show, as the channel's executives decided to replace her with the model Carolina de Moras. This generated displeasure from the public, culminating in co-host Felipe Camiroaga being loudly booed at that year's Copihue de Oro awards.

One of Salosny's best-known productions is the docu-reality show Esta es mi familia. In addition, she led the talk show Fruto prohibido together with journalist Ignacio Franzani. During the first quarter of 2013, she hosted Perdidos en la tribu and, once the broadcast was over, she decided to terminate her contract with TVN in order to sign a three-year contract with Mega to be the new host of that station's morning show.

=== Mucho gusto and Queen of Viña del Mar ===
On 2 May 2013, Salosny became the new host of Mega's morning show Mucho gusto, alongside Luis Jara. In 2015 she was a candidate for Queen of the Viña del Mar Festival, presenting herself as the first candidate in the history of the festival to reign with her own song, called "Mi Reina", a cumbia from the Chilean group La Mecha. The same year she won an Enersis Women's Energy Award in the Best Television Host category.

In February 2018 it was announced that her contract with Mega would not be renewed, and that month she left Mucho gusto.

=== Venture into late show format ===
In mid-April 2018, Salosny returned to TVN for the fourth time in her television career. On this occasion, she became the host of No culpes a la noche, a nightly late show which premiered on 14 May.

== Acting career ==
In the theatrical world, Salosny entered the academy of Fernando González to study and begin her career as an actress. She has appeared on TVN telenovelas such as Borrón y cuenta nueva, Santo ladrón, and Aquelarre, as well as some national series such as La vida es una lotería and Cuentos de mujeres.

In 2011, she appeared in the play Contracciones.

== Activism ==
Salosny is a board member of the Fundación para la Confianza (Foundation for Trust) which advocates on behalf of victims of sexual abuse, including those involved in the Karadima case.

== Filmography ==
=== TV programs ===
Year	Title	Role	Channel
1986	Extra-mujeres	Co-presenter	Chilevisión
1986–1991	Extra jóvenes	Host	Chilevisión
1991–1992	Ene TV	Host	TVN
1993	Aquí Hotel O'Higgins	Host	TVN
1993	34th Viña del Mar International Song Festival	Judge	TVN
1993	Usted decide	Host	TVN
1993	Siempre lunes	Special guest	TVN
1994	La mañana diferente	Host	Chilevisión
1994	El baile	Host	Chilevisión
1998	Taxi	Host	Canal 2 Rock & Pop
2002	El arca de Noé	Host	Canal 13
2007	Buenos Días a Todos	Panelist	TVN
2008	Pasiones	Host (replacement)	TVN
2009–2010	Buenos Días a Todos	Host	TVN
2009	Digan lo que digan	Host	TVN
2009	Pelotón III	Presenter	TVN
2010	Pelotón IV	Presenter	TVN
2010	Chile ayuda a Chile	Telephone operator	Anatel
2010–2011	Esta es mi familia	Host	TVN
2011	Fruto prohibido	Host	TVN
2013	Perdidos en la tribu	Host	TVN
2013–2018	Mucho gusto	Host	Mega
2018–present	No culpes a la noche	Host	TVN

=== Telenovelas ===
Year	Title	Role	Channel
1998	Borrón y cuenta nueva	Valentina Costa	TVN
1999	Aquelarre	Lorena Meneses	TVN
2000	Santo ladrón	Marlene Mardónez	TVN
2002	Buen partido	Silvia Salas	Canal 13
2009	Los Ángeles de Estela	Herself	TVN

=== TV series and movies ===
Year	Title	Role	Channel
1998	Mi abuelo, mi nana y yo	Sussy	TVN
2003	Cuentos de mujeres	Beatriz	TVN
2003–2004	La vida es una lotería	Sister of Marina/Gloria	TVN

== Awards ==
- 2010 Copihue de Oro for Best Woman Television Host
- 2014 Copihue de Oro for Best Woman Television Host
- 2015 Copihue de Oro for Best Woman Television Host
- 2015 Enersis Women's Energy Award in the Best Television Host category
