= Karla Constant =

Chilean journalist

Karla Andrea Constant Capetillo (born Valparaíso, 17 December 1972) is a Chilean public relations and television presenter who currently works at Canal 13.

== Career ==
Although she started on television in 1996 on TV+, it was not until her arrival at Canal 13 in 1998 that she became known for hosting programs such as Si se la puede, gana and Video loco.

In March 2002 she made her debut on the program Con ustedes with Julio Videla. Due to the success of it, she was moved to Viva la mañana at the end of the year, where she stayed for more than three years.

In 2006 she debuted in the reality show genre with La casa and later with Expedición Robinson, la isla VIP.

In 2007 she returned to the morning show time with a project called Juntos, el show de la mañana, until 2008 when she left Canal 13 and moved to Argentina due to her marriage with producer Salvador León.

In mid-2011 Karla returned to Chile and began hosting again with her old channel, replacing the presenter Diana Bolocco in the dating show 40 o 20 on Canal 13.

In January 2012 she was presenter of the realty show phenomenon of Chile Mundos opuestos; two months after the end of the show she returned to present the reality show Pareja perfecta. At the beginning of 2013 she worked on the sequel to Mundos opuestos, Mundos opuestos 2. In the second half of 2013 Karla presented the Sueño XL show as a prominent member of Canal 13.

At the beginning of 2014 Constant left Canal 13 to join Mega; during 2014 she started presenting the show Secreto a voces, replacing Pamela Díaz; in October the show was canceled to give way to the new show on the channel, Pituca sin lucas. In addition, during the Brazil World Cup 2014 Constant hosted Vive Brasil and then in November 2014 she hosted the reality show Amor a prueba.

In 2017 she assumed the position of hosting Mucho gusto after having taken over for Katherine Salosny who she had replaced while on medical leave as the result of an accident. In 2019 she announced her departure from Mucho gusto and her retirement from Mega.

However, at the end of 2020, Karla Constant returned to Mega and resumed hosting Mucho gusto. In 2021 she also hosted Got Talent Chile, along with María José Quintanilla and The covers.

In September 2022, she again left Mucho gusto, although she continued to work for Mega. In January 2023, she hosted a new cultural fringe called De paseo with María José Quintanilla.

On 25 July 2023 Constant left Mega to return to Canal 13.

Since 1 October 2023 she began hosting the reality show Tierra Brava with Sergio Lagos.

== Personal life ==
In May 2008 she married Argentine producer Salvador León after four months of dating. They both moved to Argentina and in October of the same year their first son, Pedro, was born. In mid-2011, Constant returned to Chile after separating from her husband.

In 2016, with her second husband, publicist Andrés Villaseca, Constant became the mother of Rocco, her second son.

== Television programs ==
Year	Program	Role	Channel
1996	Pipiripao	Presenter	UCVTV
1997	Descolgados	Presenter	UCVTV
1998-2003	Si se la puede, gana	Presenter	Canal 13
2000	Sin mochila	Presenter	Canal 13
2000	Esperando el 2001	Presenter	Canal 13
2001	Video loco	Presenter	Canal 13
2001-2002	La mañana del 13	Presenter	Canal 13
2002	Con ustedes	Presenter	Canal 13
2002-2005	Viva la mañana	Presenter	Canal 13
2003	Caído del cielo	Presenter	Canal 13
2006	La casa	Presenter	Canal 13
2006	Alfombra roja	Presenter	Canal 13
2006	Expedición Robinson, la isla VIP	Presenter	Canal 13
2007	Juntos, el show de la mañana	Presenter	Canal 13
2011	40 ó 20	Presenter	Canal 13
2012	Mundos opuestos	Presenter	Canal 13
2012	Pareja perfecta	Presenter	Canal 13
2012	Vértigo	Presenter	Canal 13
2013	Mundos opuestos 2	Presenter	Canal 13
2013	Sueño XL	Presenter	Canal 13
2014	Vive Brasil	Presenter	Mega
2014	Secreto a voces	Presenter	Mega
2014-2015	Amor a prueba	Presenter	Mega
2015-2016	Código rosa	Presenter	Mega
2015	The Switch Drag Race: El arte del transformismo	Presenter	Mega
2016	Peso pesado	Presenter	Mega
2016	¿Volverías con tu ex?	Guest	Mega
2016-2018	Mucho gusto	Panelist	Mega
2017	Doble tentación	Presenter	Mega
2017	La divina comida	Host	Chilevisión
2018-2019-2020	Mucho gusto	Presenter	Mega
2018	The Switch Drag Race: Desafío Mundial	Presenter	Mega
2019	Copa Culinaria Carozzi	Presenter	Mega
2021	Got Talent Chile	Presenter	Mega
2021-2022	The covers	Presenter	Mega
2023	De paseo	Presenter	Mega
2023-2024	Tu Día	Guest	Canal 13
2023-2024	Tierra Brava	Presenter	Canal 13 Latina Televisión
2024	¿Ganar o servir?	Presenter	Canal 13 Latina Televisión

== Telenovelas ==
Year	Title	Role	Channel
2005	Los simuladores		Canal 13
2007-2008	Lola	Herself	Canal 13
