= Bolocco =

Bolocco is an Italian surname. Notable people with the surname include:

- Cecilia Bolocco (born 1965), Chilean television presenter and model
- Diana Bolocco (born 1977), Chilean journalist, sister of Cecilia
