= Iván Arenas =

Chilean presenter

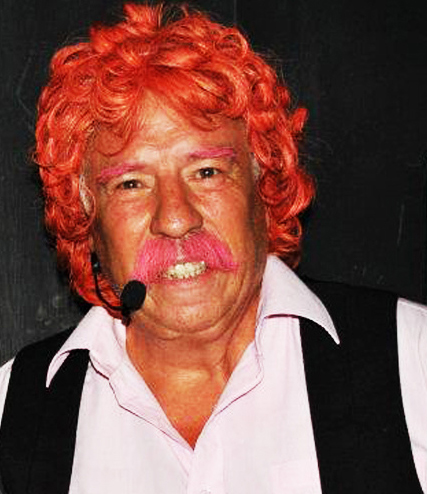
- Iván Arenas characterized as "El Profesor Rossa" in 2012.
- Born: Sergio Iván Arenas Maturana; 14 June 1951 (age 75); Rancagua, Chile
- Occupations: comedian, actor, TV presenter, Scientific divulgator
- Years active: 1975–present

Sergio Iván Arenas Maturana (Rancagua, June 14, 1951), better known as Iván Arenas, is a Chilean actor, comedian, and television presenter, mostly popular for his character «Professor Rossa», star of the children's program El Mundo del Profesor Rossa.

== Career ==
=== Early career ===
In his youth, Iván Arenas dreamed of being a magician, so he applied to The Magic Castle in Los Angeles, California. He studied at the Oscar Castro Zúñiga High School, he belonged to the School of Architecture of the Catholic University of Valparaíso, where in 1979 he graduated in Industrial Design. However, he never dedicated himself to that, but rather immersed himself in the world of entertainment.

In college he met the group Pujillay, headed by Álvaro Salas, and became an assistant to the group. In one of Pujillay's presentations on Chilevisión (then Channel 9), a producer asked Arenas to participate in the talent show, How much is the show worth?. Salas, who overheard the conversation, urged Arenas to come forward to show his skill with drawings. He did so, and reached the final, obtaining second place.

Iván Arenas began his television career in the program Para saber y jugar, by "Tía Patricia", on UCV Televisión, and in it he made his first appearances on television. Later he would do the same in the program La Naturaleza del Prof. Rossa or Professor Rossa's show, with a modest budget, which simply consisted of "Professor Rossa" teaching through drawings and data things about nature, usually animals, from somewhere in the Valparaíso region.

=== El mundo del profesor Rossa ===
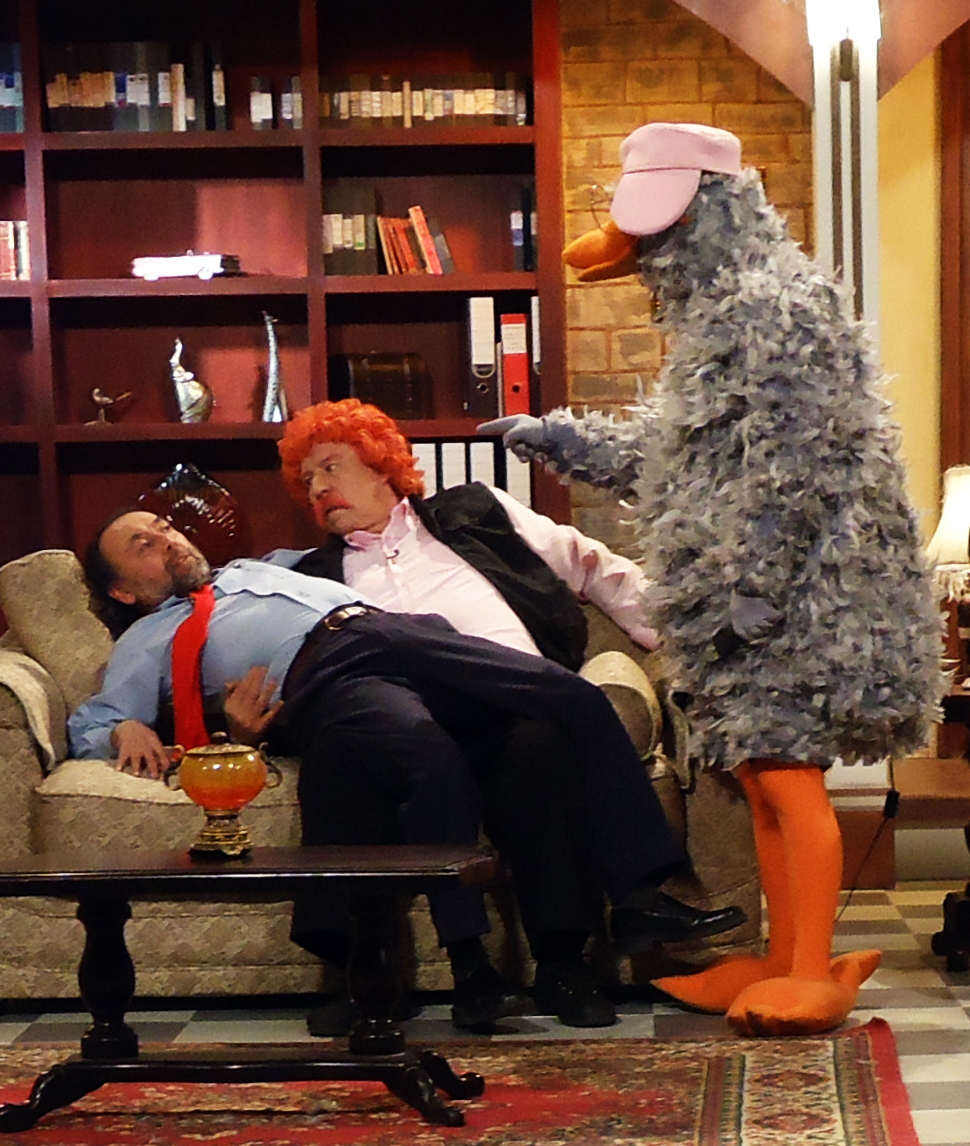
The three main characters of the show; Professor Rossa, Guru guru, and Don Carter.

Professor Rossa transcended time, after in 1984 he reached his own television space, this time on Channel 13, with El mundo del Profesor Rossa, a program that lasted more than eighteen years. In the first seasons, Professor Rossa interacted with Uncle Valentín (Valentín Trujillo), explaining topics about nature, while he listened, made comments, and incorporated musical accompaniment. Some time later, Professor Rossa discovered a secret passageway inside his own house, which connected him to a subway, a place to which the program moved for a few more seasons, leaving the first set. More characters were also incorporated, giving increasing relevance to comedy, in parallel to educational content. In it, "Professor Rossa" sought to teach viewers (children and their families) interesting features of the animal world, for which he drew pictures, presented pieces of documentaries, and traveled to places where he could observe flora and fauna, or also the culture of other countries. The humorous touch of the program gradually increased over time with the incorporation in 1985 of "Guru-Guru" (Francisco Ossa and later Claudio Moreno), and then in 1991 with "Don Carter" (Juan Alcayaga), the postman. The program became a classic on Chilean television and marked generations of children and young people in the 80's and 90's.

Parallel to this, Arenas participated in other programs of the station, no longer in the role of Professor Rossa, but as himself, as in Maravillozoo, a cultural family oriented show with contests and fauna trivia, co-conducted by Javier Miranda, and sharing screen with Claudia Conserva, Coco Legrand and Yolanda Montecinos. In 1999 he received the "Doctor José Tohá Castellá Award", recognition of scientific and technological dissemination, from the Ministry of Education of Chile.

Despite the great success of the show, The world of Professor Rossa ended in 2002 after 18 years for reasons of contract with the board of Channel 13, although this would have been triggered by the broadcast of a video, where the characters expressed themselves with rudeness and made fights as a joke, in what is considered to be the first "viral video" of Chile.

In 2005, Iván Arenas joined the Mega station, where he participated in the Entretemundo programs, which he animated together with Catalina Palacios and later with Ana Sol Romero, and La Ley de la Selva. In 2006, the Parque Safari Rancagua zoo was inaugurated, which Arenas had designed in his hometown, Rancagua.

In 2011 Iván Arenas rescues "Professor Rossa", along with the bird "Guru Guru" and "Don Carter" (his co-stars in The World of Professor Rossa), in the program La mansión Rossa broadcast by the cable channel Via X, premiered on August 8 of that year. In that program, the characters wielded a humor aimed at a more adult audience. That formula was repeated months later in La Dimension Rossa, premiered on May 5, 2012, on TVN.

=== Later career as comedian ===
Since the first semester of 2012, Iván Arenas has been a frequent guest on the program Mentiras verdaderas on La Red, where he appears in the "uncensored" humor specials broadcast on Fridays.

The success of Arenas as a comedian on television, led him to perform stand-up shows, consolidating himself with a type of vulgar humor, very different from the educational and physical humor with which he was associated for much of his career when he was known as "Professor Rossa."

In 2021 he received a Copihue de Oro award praising his trajectory.

== Personal life ==
Iván Arenas lived with Mónica Arteaga for many years, from that relationship two children were born: Iván and Ivca. After the couple's breakup, Arenas entered into a love relationship with Sandra Muñoz.

=== Health ===
Since 2002, Iván has suffered heart problems, which has caused him four heart attacks. He also suffered from colon cancer for which he underwent surgery in January 2022. Regarding his health problems, he declared in an interview in November 2022 that he did not take care of himself, and that he currently has no attachment to life.

== Filmography ==
=== Television ===
Program	Year	Channel	Notes
El mundo del Profesor Rossa	1981-1984	UCV Televisión	As «Profesor Rossa»
El mundo del Profesor Rossa	1984-2001	Canal 13	As «Profesor Rossa»
Maravillozoo	1995-2002	Canal 13	As co-presenter
Más allá de los sentidos	2001	Canal 13	As presenter
Entretemundo	2005-2006	Mega	As presenter
La ley de la selva	2005-2010	Mega	As staff
Ripley, Believe It or Not! (versión chilena)	2008-2009	Mega	As presenter
La mansión Rossa	2011-2012	Vía X	As «Profesor Rossa»
La dimensión Rossa	2012	TVN	As «Profesor Rossa»
Mentiras verdaderas	2012	La Red	As staff
La Divina Comida	2016	Chilevisión	As staff
¿Quién dice la verdad?	2017	Chilevisión	As staff
