= REC =

REC or Rec is a shortening of recording, the process of capturing data onto a storage medium.

REC may also refer to:

== Educational institutes ==
- Regional Engineering College, colleges of engineering and technology education in India
- Rajalakshmi Engineering College (Tamil: ராஜலட்சுமி பொறியியல் கல்லூரி), Thandalam, Chennai, India

== Organizations ==
- Railway Executive Committee, in Britain
- REC Limited, an infrastructure finance company in India
- Reformed Episcopal Church, an Anglican church in the United States and Canada
- Regional Economic Communities, in Africa
- Regional electricity companies, the fourteen companies created when the electricity market in the UK was privatised
- Renewable Energy Corporation, a solar power company with headquarters in Norway

- REC Silicon (no)

- Research Ethics Committee, a type of ethics committee
- Rock Eisteddfod Challenge, an Australian abstinence program
- Rural Electrification Corporation

== Television, film, and fiction ==
- 13Rec, a Chilean television channel
- Rec (film series), a Spanish horror film series
  - Rec (film), the first film in the series
- Rec (manga), a Japanese manga series; also refers to anime based on it

== Places ==
- Reç, a settlement in Albania
- Reč, a town in Montenegro
- Recife/Guararapes–Gilberto Freyre International Airport, of which the IATA code is REC
- Rectory Road railway station, of which the National Rail station code is REC
- Short for recreation ground, a park in many towns in the UK

== Other uses ==
- rec.*, a newsgroup hierarchy
- Recitation, as abbreviated on course schedules
- Renewable Energy Certificate (United States), tradable environmental commodities
- Rec., the debut extended play by South Korean singer Yuju
