= Luis Jara =

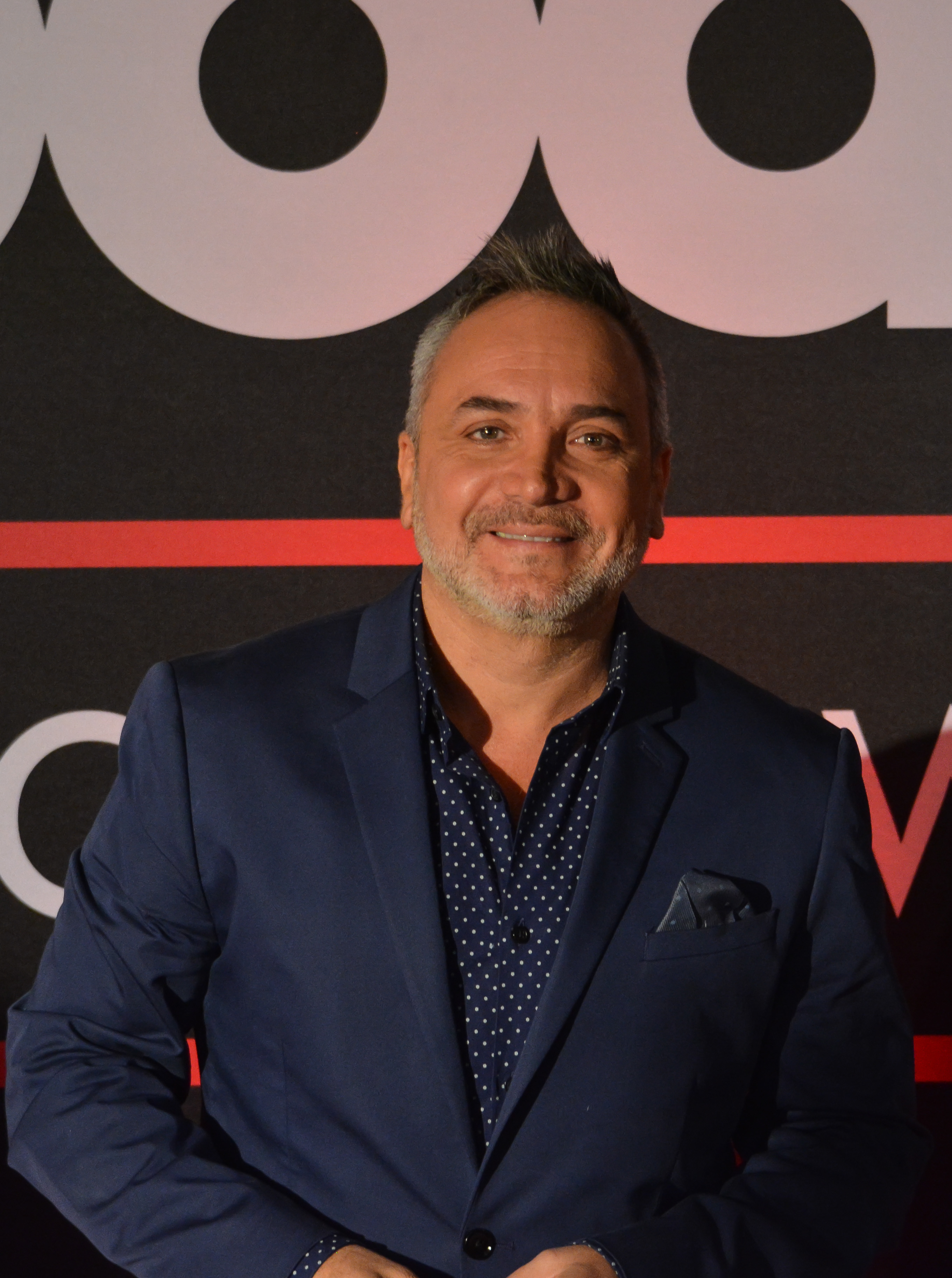
- Luis Jara in 2018

Background information
- Also known as: Lucho Jara (Note: "Lucho" is an hypocorism of the name Luis.)
- Born: Luis Alberto Jara Cantillana; October 25, 1965 (age 60); Santiago, Chile
- Origin: Chilean
- Occupations: Singer, TV host, actor
- Instrument: Voice
- Years active: 1981–present
- Labels: EMI Music; Sony Music; Universal Music; Feria Music; Plaza Independencia
- Website: www.luisjara.cl

Luis Alberto Jara Cantillana (October 25, 1965), also known as Lucho Jara, is a Chilean singer, television host and former actor. He had acting roles in the teleseries De cara al mañana (1982) and Los títeres (1984).

== Biography ==
Son of Luis Jara Vergara and Alba Rosa Cantillana, his road to the TV began when he participated in the "Clan Infantil" section of Chilean varieté TV show the show Sábados Gigantes.

Later, he participated as actor in the soap opera De cara al mañana from Televisión Nacional de Chile in 1982; after that would come his participation in the successful teleserie Los títeres from Canal 13 in 1984. In 1985, he won a festival in the stellar TV show Martes 13 with the song "Ámame". To this success, adds the song "Me hace falta", with which he gets the second place in the Viña del Mar International Song Festival in 1986. This some year he records his first album Ámame.

Followed by the Otra vez de cero (1988) and Inevitable (1990). Later, he would make his first recital, Concierto de Antología. He then proceeded to tour through the country with the album Un Golpe de Suerte (1992).

In 1995, he starts as TV host in Chilevisión, with the show ¿Cuánto vale el show?. Since he was alreadt considered a "TV promise", Jara hosts two prime time TV shows in the network: De aquí no sale and Calor humano, working in Chilevisión until December 2002.

Un Golpe de Suerte was followed by his album Emociones, that includes a heartfelt tribute to his father (deceased on October 25, 1992), next to the pianist Raúl Di Blasio. Two years later he released Para que no me olvides, and in 1998 Lo Nuestro Ayer y Hoy.

In 2002 he records his self-titled album and he release his single "Mañana", which it becomes a success. This same year, he signs contract with Canal 13, when makes debut in 2003 as TV host of La Movida del Festival (satellite TV show of Viña del Mar International Song Festival), and later he hosted with the comedian Álvaro Salas the TV show Vértigo. His consecration in TV arrives from stellar TV show Mucho Lucho, when he hosted his own comedian and talk show in prime time.

In 2003, he published his album Mi Destino, and two years after he records Tanto amor.

On March 1, 2007, he debuts in the new morning TV show of Canal 13, Juntos, El show de la mañana, with Eli de Caso and Karla Constant. The low rating of the TV show, added to its bad review, derived in disclaimer from Luis Jara in Canal 13 at the end of 2008, it's the last appearance in the matinal TV show Juntos, on December 24 of this same year.

In 2008, he releases his new album Swing, where presents covers of sings from years 1970 and 1980, in a close to jazz, blues and swing style. In 2009, he joins MEGA, where he debuts in the TV show Morandé con compañía on March 20 of this year, and he hosted his first TV show Un golpe de Lucho. The first semester of 2010, he was the TV host of the stellar TV show Elígeme in the Wednesdays. In 2011, he was TV host and backstage during auditions for the stellar talent show Yo soy..., from MEGA.

In November 2011, he hosted the talent and game TV show Coliseo romano, and on February 29, 2012, he begins to host the first season of Tu cara me suena.

On March 19, 2012, he began to host the game TV show Salta a la vista.

On May 25, 2013, his mother deceased by cancer.

Jara hosted the morning TV show Mucho gusto from 2002 to 2012.

== Television ==
=== Soap operas ===
- De Cara al Mañana (1982 – Televisión Nacional de Chile) as Juan José Aguad, the "Turco"
- Los Títeres (1984 – Canal 13) as Patricio "Pato"

=== TV Show ===
- 1995 – ¿Cuánto vale el show? (Chilevisión)
- 1996–2001 – De aquí no sale (Chilevisión)
- 2000–2002 – Calor Humano (Chilevisión)
- 2003; 2006; 2008 – La movida del Festival (Canal 13)
- 2003–2008 – Vértigo (Canal 13)
- 2003–2006 – Mucho Lusho (Canal 13)
- 2007–2008 – Juntos, el Show de la mañana (Canal 13)
- 2009 – Un golpe de Lusho Mega
- 2009–2011 – Morande con compañía Mega
- 2010–2011 – Elígeme Mega
- 2011–2012 – Yo Soy Mega
- 2011 – Coliseo romano Mega
- 2012 – Tu cara me suena Mega
- 2012 – Salta a la vista Mega
- 2013– 2018; 2019 – Mucho gusto Mega

== Discography ==
=== Studio albums ===
- Ámame (1986)
- Otra Vez de Cero (1988)
- Inevitable (1990)
- Un Golpe de Suerte (1992)
- Emociones (1997)
- Para que No me Olvides (1998)
- Lo Nuestro... de Ayer y Hoy (1999)
- Luis Jara (2002)
- Tanto Amor (2005)
- Swing (2008)
- Villancicos: Un Regalo en Navidad (2010)
- Late Fuerte (2011)
- Cerca (2014)
- La Última Tentación (2018)
- Toda Una Vida (2022)
- Latin Swing (2024)

=== Compilation albums ===
- 2005: Grandes éxitos
- 2015: Jara: 30 años

=== Live albums ===
- 2003: Mi destino
- 2007: Luis Jara: 20 años
- 2010: Grandes éxitos en vivo

=== Video albums ===
- 2004: Mi destino en vivo
- 2007: 20 años, el concierto
- 2010: Grandes éxitos en vivo

=== Singles ===
Year	Song	Highest place	Album
Year	Song	CHL	Album
Official singles
2002	"Mañana"	1	Luis Jara
2002	"No sé olvidarte"	2	Luis Jara
2003	"Envidia"	19	Mi destino
2005	"Que no daría"	1	Tanto amor
2005	"Cambia"	13	Tanto amor
2005	"No tengo que pedir perdón"	52	Tanto amor
2006	"Fuimos demasiado lejos"	47	Tanto amor
2007	"Si pudiera"	4	20 años: El concierto
2008	"Yo no sé vivir sin ti"	28	Swing
2009	"Que será de ti"	57	Swing
2010	"Noche de paz"	79	Villancicos: Un regalo en Navidad
2010	"Blanca Navidad"	84	Villancicos: Un regalo en Navidad
2011	"No sabía"	24	Late fuerte
2012	"Dos corazones rotos" (duet with Américo)	62	Late fuerte
2013	"El dueño"	–	Late fuerte
2014	"Cerca"	17	Cerca
2014	"Invencible"	45	Cerca
2015	"Quiero Ser"	73	Cerca
2017	"Enamorado" (duet with 3.30 AM)	97	La Última Tentación
2018	"La Última Tentación" (with María José Quintanilla and Franco "El Gorila")	22	La Última Tentación
2019	"Déjalo" (with Rigeo)	33	La Última Tentación

== Filmography ==
- 1996 – Bienvenida Cassandra

== Awards and nominations ==
Year	Award	Category	Result
2000	Altazor Awards	Ballad – Author's song	Nominated
2004	Altazor Awards	Ballad – Author's song	Nominated
2005	Copihue de Oro	Consecrated singer	Winner
2006	Copihue de Oro	Consecrated singer	Winner
2007	Copihue de Oro	Male Singer	Winner
2010	Copihue de Oro	Romantic Group or Singer	Winner
2011	Copihue de Oro	Romantic Group or Singer	Nominated
2012	Gold Tie	Popular Youth Face	Nominated
2012	Copihue de Oro	Romantic Group or Singer	Winner
2013	Copihue de Oro	Best TV host	Winner
2013	Copihue de Oro	Romantic Group or Singer	Winner
2014	Copihue de Oro	Best TV host	Winner
2014	Copihue de Oro	Romantic Group or Singer	Wait for...
