= Fernando Kliche =

Uruguayan-born Chilean actor (1954–2026)

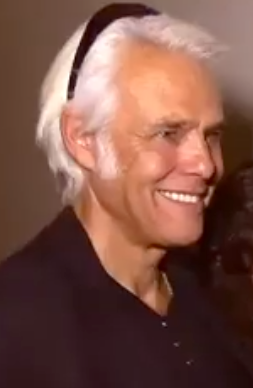
- Kliche in 2018
- Born: Fernando Walter Kliche Hermida; October 8, 1954; Montevideo, Uruguay
- Died: July 3, 2026 (aged 71); Chile
- Occupation: Actor
- Notable work: Marron glacé
- Parents: Walter Kliche (father); Griselda Hermida (mother)

Fernando Walter Kliche Hermida (October 8, 1954 – July 3, 2026) was a Uruguayan-born Chilean actor, mainly known for several television shows on Canal 13 from 1980s to 2000s.

== Early life and career ==
Fernando Walter Kliche Hermida was born in Montevideo on October 8, 1954. He is the son of Walter Kliche, and his wife, Griselda Hermida.

He moved to Chile at the age of 25, by his father who was reaping considerable success in the television world by his role in the television show La madrastra alongside Yael Unger, a famous Uruguayan actress. Kliche worked as a Veterinarian and was practicing in England. He was discovered by Arturo Moya Grau, who launched his career under the producer Ricardo Miranda and his acting mentor, Ramón Núñez Villarroel.

His first television series was Casagrande in 1981, he participated in dramatic productions in the mid-1980s and early 1990s. Like his father, he became one of the most recognized faces of Canal 13, a television station that included him in the casts of various Telenovela, such as La intrusa ,¿Te conté? and Marrón Glacé.

In the following year, Canal 13 would lose its leadership in telenovelas with the highest audience, while Kliche continued in leading roles in the channel's stable casts while also debuting as a guest panelist on other programs on the channel such as Video loco, and as an actor in the family program Venga conmigo, where he starred in the sketch Mi tío y yo, alongside Cristián de la Fuente. When Canal 13 suffered the crisis that left its Drama Department without continuity between 2000 and 2002, Kliche retired from telenovelas to dedicate himself to the project of Patricio Torres, Teatro en Chilevisión. Due to the success of the project, the project kept him as part of its regular cast for eight years. The last telenovela that Fernando Kliche would starred in was Buen partido, made and produced by Pol-ka and Chilefilms, broadcast by Canal 13 in 2002.

In 2007, Kliche returned to television series as an actor in Lola. The telenovela was so successful that Canal 13 executives commissioned two extensions to maintain high ratings, making Kliche along with several other actors, earn a successful fame. He would continue to appear more on television as a guest actor in various shows, ranging from series to telenovelas, including Amor a la Catalán on Canal 13 and Baby Bandito on Netflix.

In 2020, Kliche participated in the film Los Turistas All Inclusive alongside Patricio Torres and Alejandra Herrera. In the theater, he acted in various versions of the play ¿Por qué será que las queremos tanto? alongside Torres.

== Personal life and death ==
Kliche was married to Silvia Kliche. They had two sons. Ignacio Kliche, an actor and model, and Federico Kliche, an actor. His marriage ended in 1980. He then moved to England and had a relationship with British woman named Janette Kliche, with whom he entered into his third marriage. They had two children. Antonella Kliche and Sebastián Kliche, an engineer. He had his fifth child in the Netherlands from a relationship with a Dutch woman. He married for the fifth time, to actress Francisca Reiss. They had one child, Nicolás Kliche Reiss, an actor and film director. He partnered with Bárbara Ackermann. They had one child, who is Maximilian Kliche Ackermann.

In 1993, Kliche had a relationship with Carolina Arregui, his co-star in the telenovela Marrón Glacé. During the filming of a scene, director Óscar Rodríguez Gingins, who was married to Carolina, was forced to stop filming because the two actors continued kissing after he had yelled "cut." This led to the actress's dismissal and the end of her marriage. Despite this, Kliche had become one of the most popular and well-received actors.

In 2009, Kliche underwent surgery due to nodules in his lungs, caused by his heavy tobacco use.

Kliche died from metastasised pancreatic cancer on July 3, 2026, at the age of 71.

== Filmography ==
Film
Year	Title	Chacarter	Director
1989	Todo por nada	Juan José	Alfredo Lamadrid
1996	Punto rojo	Suárez	Alberto Daiber
2000	El viñedo	Nieto	Esteban Schroeder
2005	Secuestro	Guillermo	Gonzalo Lira
2006	Pretendiendo	Pablo	Claudio Dabed
2009	Súper, todo Chile adentro	Gurú	Fernanda Alijaro
2016	La noche del jabalí	Benno	Ramiro Tenorio
2020	Los turistas All Inclusive	—	Elías Llanos

Telenovelas
Year	Title	Character	Broadcast	Notes
1981	Casagrande	Eduardo	Canal 13 (Chile)	debut como actor
1982	Alguien por quien vivir	Jaime	Canal 13 (Chile)	
1983	Las herederas	Sergio Lara	Canal 13 (Chile)	
1984	Andrea	Ernesto Cruz	Canal 13 (Chile)	
1985	La trampa	Máximo	Canal 13 (Chile)	
1989	La intrusa	Jack Mine	Canal 13 (Chile)	Protagonista
1990	¿Te conté?	Walter Bueno	Canal 13 (Chile)	
1990	Pobre diabla	Vicente Ustari	Eltrece (Argentina)	
1991	Blue Jeans	Anselmo	VTV (Venezuela)	Protagonista
1992	Fácil de amar	Francisco	Canal 13 (Chile)	
1993	Marrón glacé	Octavio Silva	Canal 13 (Chile)	Protagonista
1994	Champaña	Bruno Biondi	Canal 13 (Chile)	Protagonista
1995	El amor está de moda	Andrés Correa	Canal 13 (Chile)	Protagonista
1996	Marrón glacé 2, el regreso	Octavio Silva	Canal 13 (Chile)	Protagonista
1997	Eclipse de luna	Ignacio Echaurren	Canal 13 (Chile)	
1998	Amándote	Alfredo Brandauer	Canal 13 (Chile)	
1999	Algo está cambiando	Charles Quesney	Mega (Chile)	
2002	Buen partido	Guillermo Carmona	Canal 13 (Chile)	Antagonista
2007	Lola	Eduardo Padilla	Canal 13 (Chile)	
2008	Lola 2	Eduardo Padilla	Canal 13 (Chile)	
2009	Corazón rebelde	Franco Colucci	Canal 13 (Chile)	Protagonista
2011	Soltera otra vez	Ruddy Córdova	Canal 13 (Chile)	
2012	Pobre rico	Johnny Denver	TVN (Chile)	Antagonista Episodios: (74 - 79/219 - 227)
2014	No abras la puerta	Germán Tobar	TVN (Chile)	
2017	Dime quién fue	Guillermo Lyon	TVN (Chile)	Antagonista
2019	Amor a la Catalán	Pedro Catalán	Canal 13 (Chile)	

Series
Year	Title	Character	Notes
1996	Amor a domicilio, la comedia	Narrador	
1996	Vecinos puertas adentro	Fernando	Episodio: La herencia
2000	La otra cara del espejo	Miguel	Episodio: Bárbara
2000	La otra cara del espejo	René	Episodio: La Premonición
2000	La otra cara del espejo	Germán	Episodio: Yerba Loca
2001	La otra cara del espejo	Arturo	Episodio: Sola en la noche
2004	Geografía del deseo	José Miguel Antúnez	
2006	La vida es una lotería	Tito	Episodio: Los Argentinos
2007	Herederos	Ernesto Ballesteros	Episodio: Tal palo, tal astilla
2009	Experimento Wayápolis	Señor Waipex	
2010	Infieles	Orlando	Episodio: Calambrito
2013	Chico reality	César Chandía	Reparto
2014	La canción de tu vida	Fernando	Episodio: Loca
2015	Dueños del paraíso	Pedro Pablo Alemparte	Reparto. Producida por TVN y Telemundo
2015	Los años dorados	Padre John	Episodio: El finado. Producida por UCV y The Walt Disney Company Latin America
2017	Papá mono	Fernando	2 episodios
2022	Paola y Miguelito	Gigio Scapaletli	Episodio: Miguelito futbolista
2025	Baby Bandito 2	Luther Kronen	Antagonista. Producida por Fábula y Netflix

TV Shows
Year	Title	Role	Notes
1994	El tiempo es oro	como actor	
1995-2000	Teatro en Canal 13	como actor	varios roles
1996-2001	Venga conmigo	como actor	varios roles
1997-1998	Video loco	como panelista	
2001	Maravillozoo	como panelista	
2000	Jappening 2000	como actor	varios roles
2004-2014	Teatro en Chilevisión	como actor	varios roles
2009	TV o no TV	Él mismo	
2012	Mundos opuestos 2	como anfitrión	
2015	El Menú	como conductor	
