= Secreto a voces =

Chilean TV talk show

- Genre: Showbiz and entertainment talk show
- Directed by: Mauro Caro
- Presented by: Karla Constant; Mario Velasco
- Country of origin: Chile
- Original language: Spanish
- No. of seasons: 4 years

Production
- Executive producer: Gonzalo Cordero
- Producer: Rodolfo Saavedra

Original release
- Network: Mega
- Release: February 3, 2011 – October 13, 2014

Secreto a voces (Open Secret) was a Chilean TV talk show focusing on show business and broadcast on the Mega TV network. It was hosted by Mario Velasco and Karla Constant with the assistance of a group of panelists who pose questions to invited celebrity guests and contribute analysis. The 90-minute show was last broadcast weekdays at noon.

== History ==
Around the beginning of 2011, discussion began about a new prime time show to be called Placer culpable (Guilty Pleasure) and which would be hosted by Julio César Rodríguez. As time went on plans crystallized, the show was named Secreto a Voces and Giancarlo Petaccia was named as host along with a four-member panel who would pose questions to invited guests. The first broadcast was on February 3, 2011 with invited guests Raquel Calderón and Eduardo Cruz-Johnson. Petaccia remained as host until the end of 2012 and was replaced by Karla Constant and Mario Velasco.

In 2012 and 2013, the show went through a number of changes in broadcast time and in the makeup of the panel, ending up in the 7:30 prime time slot where it faced tough ratings competition against Alfombra Roja (Red Carpet) on Canal 13 and the blockbuster Somos los Carmona (We Are the Carmonas) on TVN. In September 2013, amidst rumors that the show would be canceled, it was rescheduled to the noon time slot, where it would face off against The Simpsons on Canal 13, as well as the top-rated entertainment talk show SQV on Chilevisión which traditionally had occupied that slot.

A shakeup in July 2014 shifted the program format away from mostly opinion to include more investigation and reporting. As part of that, changes in staff were made including adding Karla Constant as host instead of Pamela Diaz and changing some panel members. In the months following, ratings for 2014 rose half a point, and a full point since 2013.

The last show was broadcast on October 13, 2014.

== Cast and crew ==
=== Hosts ===
Current

- Mario Velasco (2012- )
- Karla Constant (2014- )

Former

- Giancarlo Petaccia (2011–12)
- Pamela Díaz (2012-2014)

=== Panel members ===
Final

- Margarita Hantke
- Manuel González (2014- )
- Patricia Maldonado (2011-2012, 2014-présent)
- Pablo Zúñiga (2012- )
- Paula Escobar

Former

- Pamela Díaz
- Javiera Suárez
- Andrés Baile
- Catalina Palacios
- Yamna Lobos
- Esteban Morais
- Patricia Maldonado
- Andrés Mendoza
- María Luisa Cordero
- Katherine Bodis
- Rocío Marengo
- Rubén Selman
- Vasco Moulian
- Vanessa Miller
- Eduardo Bonvallet
- Alejandra Valle

=== Journalists and reporters ===
Final

- Yiro Gatica
- Carolina Gatica
- Valeria Uberuaga
- Maria Ignacia Rocha
- Daniela Aliste
- Gerald Paredes

Former

- Karina Pichara
- Carolina Rojas
- Francisco Kaminski (2012)

=== Production ===
- Director : Mauro Caro
- Executive Producer : Gonzalo Cordero
- Producer : Rodolfo Saavedra
- News editor : Clara Tapia

== See also ==
- Television in Chile
- Mega (Chilean television channel)
