= El Mundo del Profesor Rossa =

- Created by: Iván Arenas
- Starring: Iván Arenas, Valentín Trujillo. Francisco Ossa, Claudio Moreno, Juan Alcayaga
- Country of origin: Chile

Production
- Running time: 75:00-90:00

Original release
- Network: UCV TV (1983-1984); Canal 13 (1984-2002)
- Release: 1981 – 2001

El Mundo del Profesor Rossa ([Spanish Language] for The World of Professor Rossa) was a Chilean children's television show centering on a professor named "Professor Rossa" (Iván Arenas), who taught about Chilean national animals, mountains and nature. The show was broadcast on UCV TV from 1983 to 1984 and on Canal 13 from 1984 to 2001.

== Premise ==
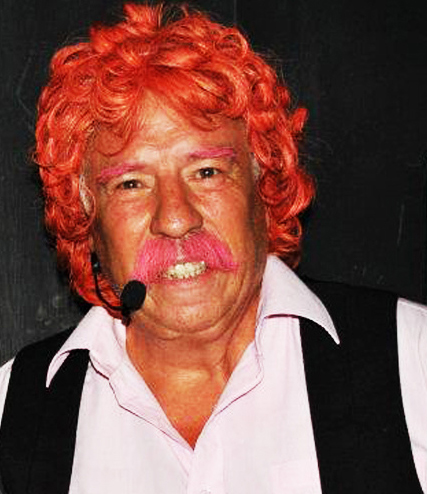
The Professor Rossa

The show was set in Professor Rossa's house. The first seasons, the program only starred the professor and piano composer Valentin Trujillo. Guru Guru appeared later, as a man in bird disguise who delivered the children's letters to the professor, the bird started to have a "father-son" relationship with the professor, so Guru Guru left the postman role. Don Carter came to fill the role and the show was expanded to four characters.

The four characters interacted inside the house always doing a mess, irritating the professor to bring humor to the program. In some seasons, the professor moved the show from his living room to an underground room connected by a secret passage, leaving the first set.

The professor had videos about animals and nature in Betacam format, and to watch it, the character must put the tape in front of his eyes.

== Main characters ==
- Professor Rossa (played by Iván Arenas): A Professor with pink hair and moustache, who taught about Chilean animals.
- Guru Guru (Francisco Ossa, later played by Claudio Moreno): A man in bird disguise with pink cap and glasses, hatched from an egg left on set. He speaks in a very particular way, using frequently the letter G.
- Don Carter (Juan Alcayaga): A postman. Friend of Guru Guru.
- Tío Valentín (Valentín Trujillo): Uncle Valentín was the pianist. His appearances on the program were less frequent in the last years of the show.

Three characters of the show, Guru Guru (left), Professor Rossa (center) and Valentin Trujillo (right)

== Awards ==
The show received, in both 1986 and 1988, the "Best Children Program" Award by the Chilean CNTV.
