= Viva el lunes =

- Created by: Gonzalo Beltrán
- Presented by: Álvaro Salas; Cecilia Bolocco; Kike Morandé
- Country of origin: Chile
- Original language: Spanish
- No. of seasons: 11

Production
- Producers: Claudio Vukovic; Raquel González
- Running time: Approx. 90 minutes

Original release
- Network: Canal 13 (Chile)
- Release: October 16, 1995 – January 29, 2001

Related
- El Lunes sin Falta

Viva el lunes (English: Live the Monday) was a Chilean TV show, broadcast on Canal 13 for 11 seasons, that aired from October 16, 1995, to January 29, 2001. The TV hosts were Miss Universe 1987 and ex-newsreader Cecilia Bolocco, comedian Álvaro Salas, and businessman and TV host Kike Morandé.

After the end of the show, Morandé went to Mega, where he began a late night show, Morandé con Compañía, followed by Salas.

The Studio 3 that was used by Viva el Lunes today is called "Gonzalo Bertrán Studio", in honor of the show's director, who died on January 30, 2001, one day after the last episode. This studio was used by other late night shows such as Nace una estrella (2000-2001), El lunes sin falta (2001), Por fin es lunes (2002-2003), Aquí se pasa Mundial (2002), Vértigo (2003-2008), and Mucho Lucho (2003-2006).

In 2014, Viva el lunes was retransmitted in Rec TV. On November 16, 2015, Canal 13 released ReViva El Lunes, a compilation of the best of 6 years from the show.

The show launched the stardom of Brazilian singer Xuxa.
