= Video loco =

- Presented by: Álvaro Salas (1991–2002); Checho Hirane (1991–1996); Carolina Arregui (1991–1994); Eliseo Salazar (1991–1994); Paola Camaggi (1994–1996); Claudia Conserva (1995–2000, 2002); Savka Pollak (1997–2002); Fernando Kliche (1997–1998); Jorge Zabaleta (1999–2002); Amaya Forch (2001); Karla Constant (2001)
- Country of origin: Chile
- Original language: Spanish

Production
- Running time: 150 minutes

Original release
- Network: Canal 13 (Chile)
- Release: 7 June 1991 – 26 April 2002

Video loco (English: Crazy Video) is a Chilean television program that aired on Canal 13 from 1991 to 2002. It was the Chilean adaptation of America's Funniest Home Videos, produced by American television channel ABC since 1989. The program consisted of bloopers in different categories, to which they were added dialogues and expressions with the local language by the TV hosts to make them funnier to the public.

== History ==
In its beginning it had as panelists to Checo Hirane, Alvaro Salas, Eliseo Salazar and Carolina Arregui. In August 1994 Arregui retired and joined Paola Camaggi. The dynamics of the TV show was that each panelist was characterized by presenting different types of videos; for example, Eliseo were sports, Alvaro were animals and Paola were children.

In December of same year, Salazar left the show, joined Claudia Conserva in 1995, but in 1996 the show began to decline. In this year, Checho Hirane and Paola Camaggi left the show, and in 1997, joined the TV host Savka Pollak and the actor Fernando Kliche, for the next two years. In 1999 joined the actor Jorge Zabaleta, and Kliche left the show; this team lasted for 1999 – 2000 seasons. To this moment, Video Loco was shown the Fridays at 22:00 hours.

Between 5 and 26 December 2001, on Wednesdays one mini-season (composed of 4 chapters) of Video Loco , which featured Salas, Pollak and Zabaleta was issued, however Claudia Conserva was absent in this cycle because recently just had her first son. His place was taken in the first two chapters by actress Amaya Forch, and the remaining two by the TV host Karla Constant.

In April 2002 it transmitted a mini season of the show again. This time back to the Fridays and composed of the same formation that had been in the seasons 1999 and 2000 (Salas, Conserva, Pollak and Zabaleta). For those chapters, besides the usual videos and contests, the show received several, including some historical special guests as Eliseo Salazar. The last season was in 2002. The exact causes of the end of the TV show are not known, but everything suggests to his already worn formula and repeated videos, plus the massification of Internet videos.

== Retransmission and similar TV shows ==
- The series was retransmitted from October – December 2008, in Canal 13 at 11 am. From January 2009 was retransmitted at 8 am, replacing morning TV show Juntos, el show de la mañana.
- In 2008 Canal 13 transmitted a video TV show called Viernes de Lokkos, paying tribute to the old program and occupying the same schedule.

== Panelists ==
- Alvaro Salas (1991–2002)
- Checho Hirane (1991–1996)
- Carolina Arregui (1991–1994)
- Eliseo Salazar (1991–1994)
- Paola Camaggi (1994–1996)
- Claudia Conserva (1995–2000, 2002)
- Savka Pollak (1997–2002)
- Fernando Kliche (1997–1998)
- Jorge Zabaleta (1999–2002)
- Amaya Forch (2001)
- Karla Constant (2001)
