= Zalo Reyes =

Chilean singer (1947–2022)

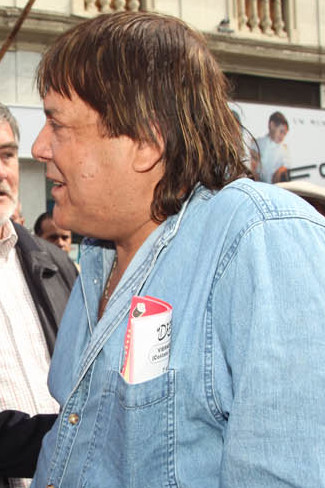
- Reyes in 2009
- Born: Boris Leonardo González Reyes; 3 November 1952; Conchalí, Chile
- Died: 21 August 2022 (aged 69); Santiago, Chile
- Occupation: Singer

Boris Leonardo González Reyes (3 November 1952 – 21 August 2022), best known as Zalo Reyes, was a Chilean singer. He was also known by the nickname "Gorrión de Conchalí" ("Sparrow of Conchalí").

== Life and career ==
Born in Conchalí, Reyes started his career in the late 1970s, and got his first hit in 1979 with the song "Una lágrima y un recuerdo", recorded with the group Espiral. He got the peak of his fame in the 1980s, even thanks to the participation in several popular television programs of the time, such as Sábado Gigante. In 1983 he took part in the Viña del Mar International Song Festival with the song "Con una lágrima en la garganta". Other Reyes' hits include "Ramito de violetas", "Acorralado entre mis lágrimas", "María Teresa y Danilo" and "My Prisonera". In 2013 he received a Copihue de Oro for his career.

Reyes died of complications from diabetes on 21 August 2022, at the age of 69.
