= Javiera Suárez =

Chilean journalist (1982–2019)

- Born: Javiera Consuelo Suárez Balbontín; 29 December 1982; Santiago, Chile
- Died: 12 June 2019 (aged 36); Santiago, Chile
- Occupation: Journalist
- Spouse: Cristián Arriagada (m. 2015)

Javiera Consuelo Suárez Balbontín (29 December 1982 – 12 June 2019) was a Chilean journalist, known mainly for her participation in the program Así Somos on La Red and for having been a presenter of the program No eres tú, soy yo on Zona Latina.

== Television career ==
In 2008, Suárez debuted as a journalist on the morning program Juntos on Canal 13 and a few months later she was hired as a panelist for SQP on Chilevisión. In 2010, she came to the morning program Pollo en conserva, together with Daniela Cerda, as a commentator. In 2011, she joined the program Así Somos and was the presenter of La culpa no es del chancho, a Chilean adaptation of The Soup, which was broadcast by UCV Televisión, which was canceled a few days after its premiere. In 2011, together with Juan Andrés Salfate, she presented the program El rincón de Salfate on FM Tiempo. Between October 2012 and June 2014, she was a panelist for the show Secreto a voces on Mega and also conducted a game show on the same channel. In September 2014, she signed as the face of Zona Latina.

== Personal life and death ==
Suárez studied at Santiago College and at Finis Terrae University, where she graduated as a journalist. In 2009, she underwent surgery to remove a cancerous mole.

In October 2015, Suárez married plastic surgeon Cristián Arriagada. In May 2016, she was diagnosed with Stage IV melanoma, which subsequently spread to her liver, bones, lung, and right breast while she was seven weeks pregnant. To facilitate her cancer treatment, the option of abortion was offered to her, to which she refused. Her son Pedro Milagros was born completely healthy, breaking a paradigm of cancer medicine regarding pregnancy in patients diagnosed with melanoma. On 10 June 2019, she was admitted to the Clínica Alemana de Santiago, after her health condition worsened. After a long battle with cancer, Suárez died on 12 June, at the age of 36. She is buried in the Parque del Recuerdo de Américo Vespucio cemetery in Huechuraba.
