= ETC (Chilean TV channel) =

Chilean cable television channel

- Broadcast area: Chile

Programming
- Picture format: 1080i HDTV

Ownership
- Owner: 2BeNamed
- Sister channels: Knino

History
- Launched: August 1, 1996
- Former names: Etc TV (1996-2015)

Links
- Website: Official site

ETC is a Chilean cable television channel currently owned by 2BeNamed. The channel's slogan is "Todo pasa por Etc..." (Everything Happens on Etc...). Launched in 1996, the company was previously owned by Telefilms Ltda. Starting with a low budget, the channel was originally conceived as a "miscellaneous" channel (the name of the channel, ETC, is based on et cetera), focusing on children's programming and some North American sitcoms in its first year. In 1997, when the channel aired Sailor Moon and Saint Seiya, it experienced an increase in its ratings, leading it to narrow its focus to include primarily Japanese anime, though, in recent years, it has also added some South Korean programming including K-pop and K-dramas.

In March 2026, rumors emerged regarding a possible sale of the channel by the holding company Megamedia; this was confirmed on the 31st of that month via the outlet Prensario Internacional, with the channel being acquired by the signal distribution company 2BeNamed. Prior to the confirmation of the sale, a post was made on its Instagram profile on March 16th mentioning Knino—an animal-themed channel that had been launched by 2BeNamed that same month.

== See also ==
- List of Chilean television channels
