= Zona Latina =

- Country: Chile
- Broadcast area: Chile
- Headquarters: Santiago, Chile

Programming
- Language: Spanish
- Picture format: 1080i (HDTV)

Ownership
- Owner: TVI Filmocentro Televisión
- Sister channels: Via X Via X 2 ARTV; Docu

History
- Launched: August 1997

Links
- Website: zonalatinatv.com

Zona Latina is a private owned cable TV channel of Chile. It airs Spanish language music videos as well as Talk Shows. Its sister station is Via X which airs English language music videos. It is owned by 'Television Interactiva and is available on cable. On April 9, 2012, the channel premiered its first program called Sabores ¿Qué cocinamos hoy? (English: Flavors: What are we cooking today?) Other shows are "Sin Dios Ni Late", hosted by journalist Carola Brethauer and "No eres tú, soy yo", hosted by Javiera Suárez.

Screenshot of the TV channel with the correspondent logo in 2006.

== See also ==
- List of Chilean television channels
