= Álvaro Salas =

Chilean humourist

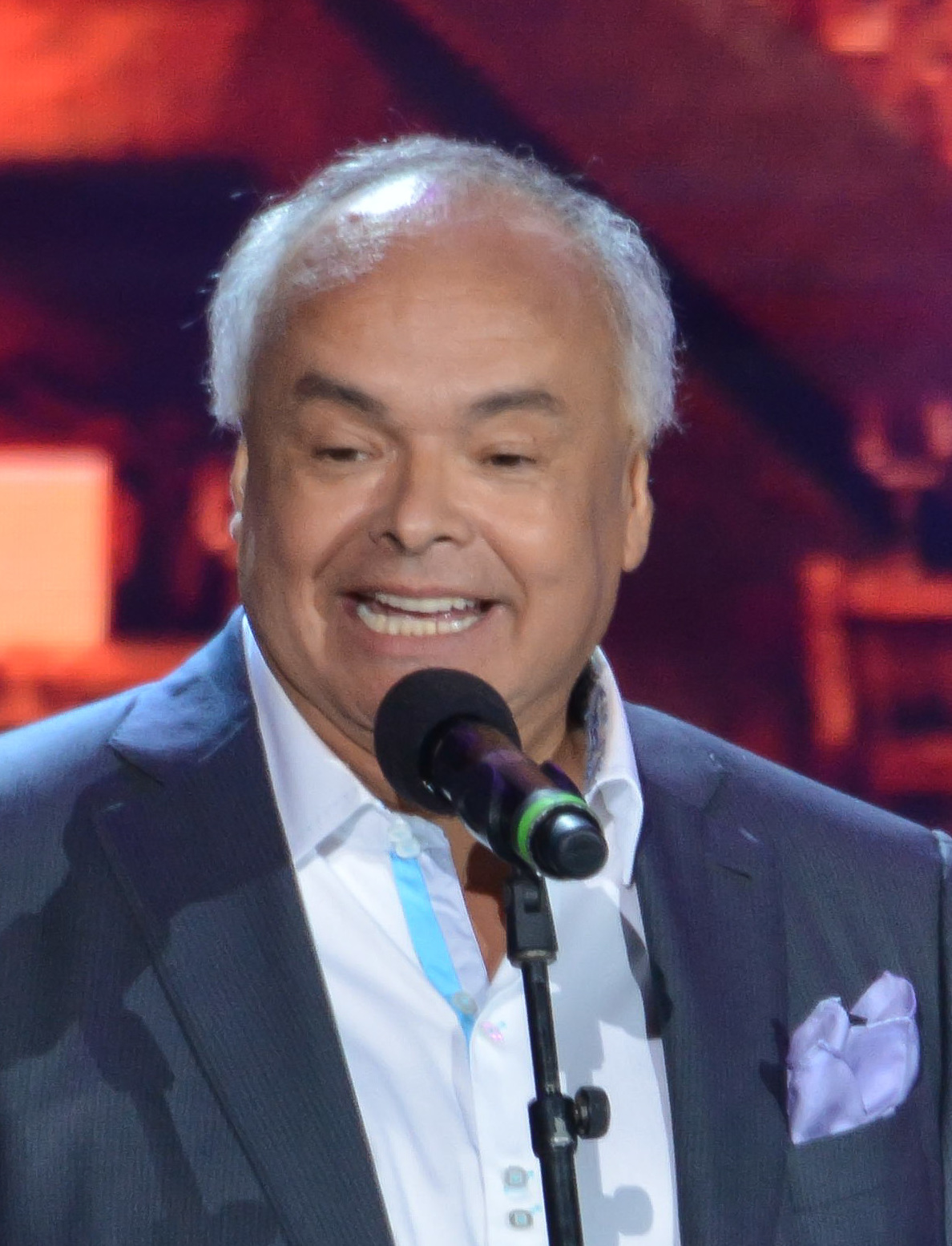
- Salas at the Olmué Festival in 2018

Personal details
- Born: 27 November 1952 (age 73) Valparaíso, Chile
- Spouse: Mariza Soto
- Children: Three
- Education: Pontifical Catholic University of Valparaíso (BA)
- Occupation: Comedian
- Profession: Musician

Álvaro Reinaldo Salas Carvajal (born 27 December 1952) is a Chilean comedian and television personality.

== Biography ==
He was born in the port city of Valparaíso. He spent his childhood on the San Juan de Dios Hill, where he began to develop his humor. Then, Salas joined to study Pedagogy in Music at the Pontifical Catholic University of Valparaíso (PUCV). It was there that in 1975 he joined some friends to form the humorous group «Pujillay», whose initial goal was to help his parents pay their fees for their careers. He remained in «Pujillay» until 1991, time in which the group performed three times at the Viña del Mar International Song Festival (1982, 1985 and 1990 editions), receiving a good review from the public. By the other hand, he was panelist of the classic UCV TV Show de Goles program, where he represented Santiago Wanderers, football team of which he declares himself a fan.

In 1992, he continued his career as a «soloist» comedian, participating in several television and stellar programs such as Una Vez Más (with Raúl Matas) or Video Loco, both on Canal 13. This catapulted his career as a television presenter, so he animated programs like Viva el lunes, Lunes sin falta, La Movida del Festival or Vertigo, all on Canal 13.

As a known comedian, he has performed twice at the Viña del Mar Festival, precisely in the 2000 and in 2007 editions, in which he met with Pujillay. In early 2008, he didn't renew his contract with Canal 13, so in March he moved to TVN to coanimate the stellar Animal Nocturno together with Felipe Camiroaga.

In April 2010, Salas signed a two-year contract with Mega, where he began participation in the morning show Mucho gusto. Then he participated as a jury in the impersonator program «Yo soy» and its comedians spin off, Roman Coliseum. His participation in that last program is still remembered due to its good rating.

In 2014, he returned to Canal 13 to be part of the stellar La Movida del Mundial.

Since 2021 he has participated together with Iván Arenas and Claudio Palma in the program «Mesa para 3» on TV+.
