= 13Rec =

Chilean television channel

- Country: Chile
- Broadcast area: Chile
- Headquarters: Santiago, Chile

Programming
- Language: Spanish
- Picture format: 1080i HDTV (downscaled to 16:9 480i for the SDTV feed)

Ownership
- Owner: Canal 13 SpA; Grupo Luksic (through TV Medios Investments Ltd.)
- Sister channels: Canal 13; 13 Internacional; 13C; T13 En Vivo

History
- Launched: 1 April 2014
- Former names: Rec TV (2014–2025)

Links
- Website: www.13.cl/rec

13Rec (formerly Rec TV, branded as REC in that period) is a Chilean subscription television channel, owned by the Luksic Group and operated by Secuoya Chile. Its programming consists of reruns of content from Canal 13's archives, as well as some original content.

== History ==
Canal 13 announced Rec TV in late March 2014, whose programming was based on miscellaneous, comedy, reality and telenovela programming, already broadcast in the past on the main channel, with remastered audiovisual material. On 28 March of that year, it was announced that Movistar would become the first provider to carry the channel, on both its satellite and IPTV services. Moreover, its launch date and channel number were announced.

Three days later, Rec TV started broadcasting on Movistar, and on 17 April, it joined TuVes HD.

Later, on 1 September 2015, it announced on its Facebook account that it would begin streaming its service online — under prior free registration. The next day, on the same account, it explained that it was due to the fact that the channel was conceived solely for pay television.

Between 31 May and 1 June 2016, the channel ceased operation on TuVes HD, due to the company realigning its channel line-up to reach wider audiences, according to tastes and needs, however, the channel stated that it did not reach a contractual agreement (13C was also removed).

Two days later, the channel launched on Claro, whereas in early 2017, it joined Gtd, Telsur and Entel.

From 2019, the channel started making original programs focusing on nostalgia. The first of which was RECordando Más música with Andrea Tessa, which combined interviews with Más música segments. This eventually became RECordando... con Andrea Tessa, broadening its scope beyond music. Tessa also hosted Quédate en la música, similar to the previous two but with international celebrities such as Paul Anka, Ana Torroja and Luis Fonsi, held using video chat due to the pandemic.

On 15 March 2022, VTR announced the arrival of Rec TV to its lineup, following the mass removal of Disney Media Networks Latin America which were leaving the platform or shutting down altogether; the channel arrived to the provider on 1 April, in both SD and HD formats.

On 10 December 2025, and after three months of prelaunching, Rec TV unveiled a new look and was renamed 13Rec.
