= Bárbara Rebolledo =

Chilean television presenter (born 1973)

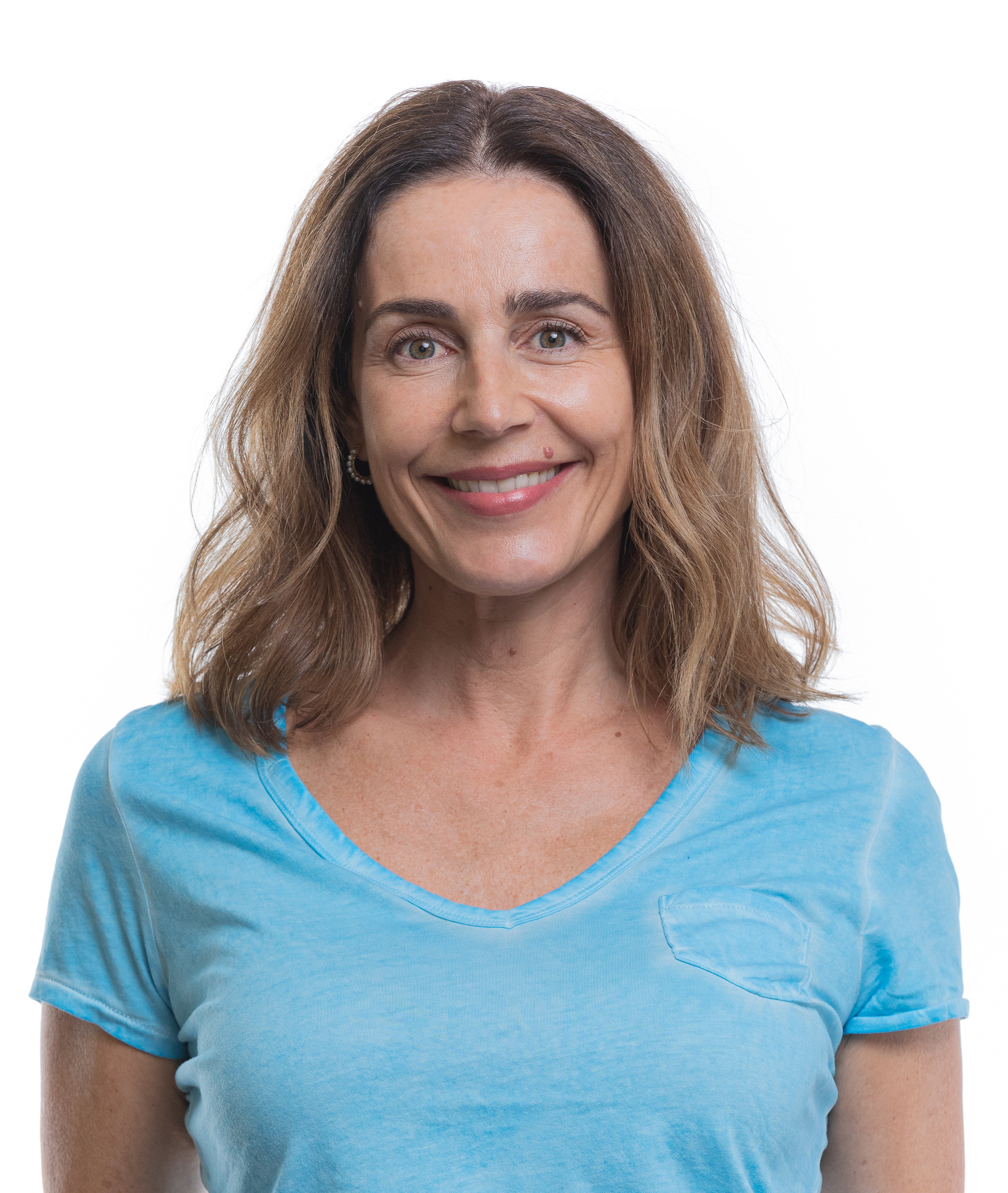

Member of the Constitutional Convention
- In office 4 July 2021 – 4 July 2022
- Preceded by: Office established
- Constituency: 17th District

Personal details
- Born: 22 January 1973 (age 53) Linares, Chile
- Spouse: Fernando Giner
- Children: 2
- Education: Gabriela Mistral University; Universidad del Desarrollo
- Occupation: Journalist television presenter

Bárbara Rebolledo Sánchez (born 22 January 1973) is a Chilean journalist, television presenter and former constituent.

She is recognized for her work in Chilean television, particularly on Televisión Nacional de Chile (TVN), where she was a presenter during the 2000s in programs such as Pasiones and Pelotón.

In parallel to her media career, Rebolledo pursued academic training in journalism, studying at Gabriela Mistral University and later at the Universidad del Desarrollo, two private institutions in Santiago. Her background in communication and public affairs led to her participation in civic and political activities, culminating in her election to the Chilean Constitutional Convention in 2021 as part of the 17th District.

== Television career ==
Rebolledo completed her professional internship on the Canal 13's midday program Nuestra Hora, where she conducted on-street interviews and participated alongside hosts Patricio “Pato” Oñate and Juan Carlos “Pollo” Valdivia while completing her journalism studies. She later worked at Mega before joining TVN, where she was part of Buenos días a todos for four years. She replaced Eli de Caso in Buenas tardes Eli due to de Caso's illness. Rebolledo also co-hosted the programs Día a día a día and La Ruta de Beringia with Ricardo Astorga.

In 2004, Rebolledo co-hosted the successful talk show Pasiones with Felipe Camiroaga, later joined by Martín Cárcamo; she led the final season solo. She was also one of the hosts, alongside Camiroaga, of the reality show Pelotón and its spin-off Abre los ojos, interviewing eliminated contestants. After Pasiones concluded in late 2008, she stepped back from television to focus on her family. During this time, she launched a production company.

Rebolledo made her return in 2013 with the political talk show En la vereda on TV Senado, and in 2015 she hosted the cultural program Cultura en la ciudad on Canal 13C.

In late 2016, she hosted the interview series Así es la vida on Canal 13C (cable television). Also, she briefly filled in on Chilevisión's La mañana de CHV, replacing Carolina de Moras and marking her return to live television after nine years, receiving widespread praise from both viewers and the press.

In 2019, she hosted Cariño malo on TV+ alongside Daniel Valenzuela and Cristina Tocco.

== Political career ==
In 2021, Rebolledo was elected as a member of the Chilean Constitutional Convention, representing the 17th District, which includes parts of the Maule Region. She ran as an independent candidate and served from 4 July 2021 to 4 July 2022, participating in the Convention's work during a critical phase of Chile's constitutional debate.
