= Karol Lucero =

Chilean television and radio personality

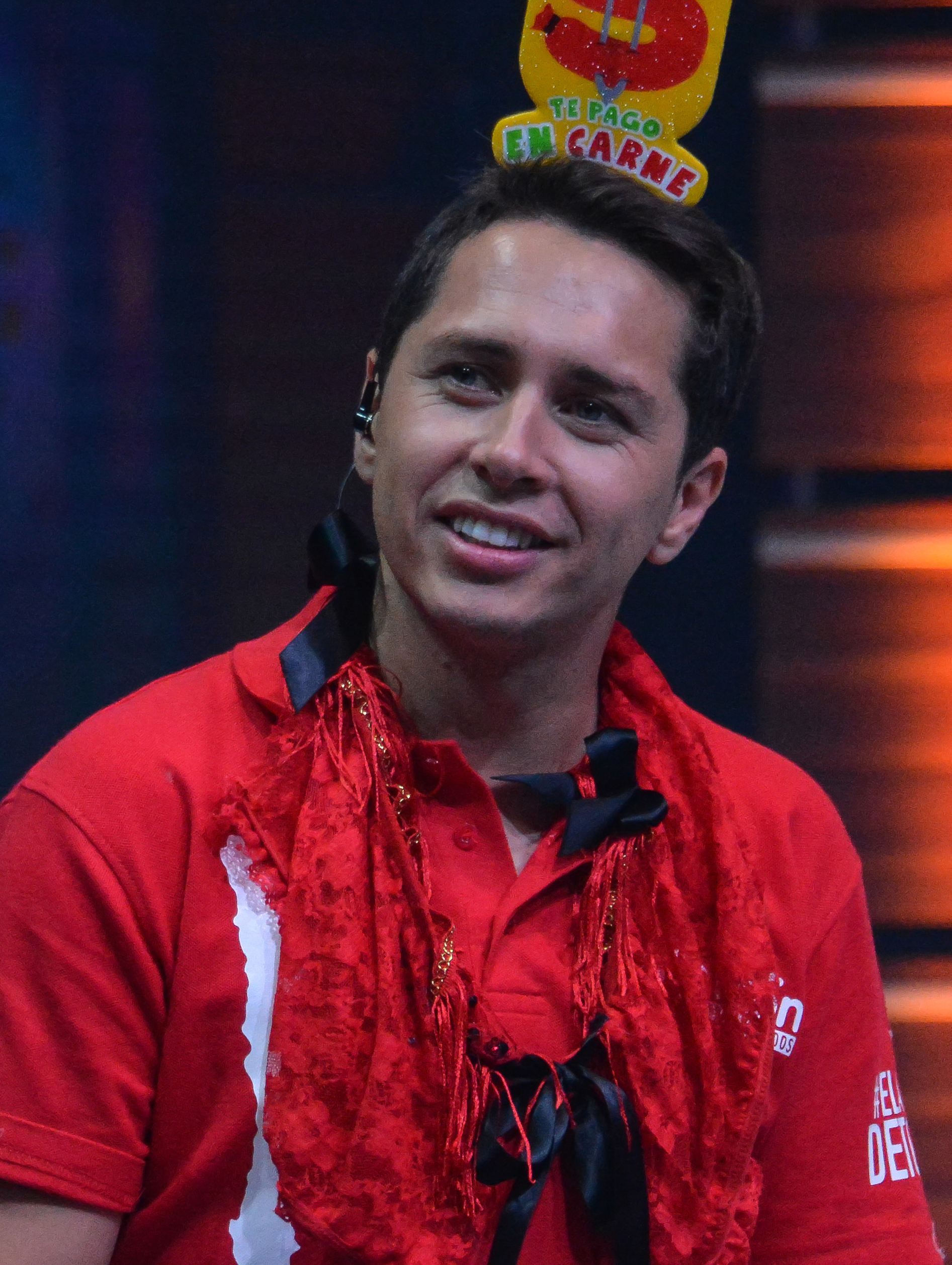
- Born: Karol Jesús Lucero Venegas; April 17, 1987 (age 39); Santiago, Chile
- Other name: Karol Dance
- Occupations: Television host, radio personality
- Years active: 2007–present
- Partner: Fran Virgilio
- Parents: Fernando Lucero (father); Nancy Venegas (mother)

Karol Jesús Lucero Venegas (born 17 April 1987), known by his old stage name, Karol Dance, is a Chilean television presenter, radio host, musician, singer, and actor.

Up until 2019, he was one of the characters on the television channel Mega, where he served as a panelist in the magazine Mucho Gusto and the radio station Radio Carolina, where he hosted “Comunidad K”. He was also a columnist for the Hoy x Hoy newspaper.

Due to being widely criticized by the protesters of the Chilean social outburst, along with several other controversies, Karol temporarily retired from being a public figure.

== Biography ==
Karol Lucero was born in Santiago. His parents Nancy Venegas and Fernando Lucero named him after Karol Wojtyla (Pope John Paul II), as he was visiting Chile at the time. Karol has a younger brother, named Felipe.

He studied at the Colegio Fray Camilo Henriquez and graduated from eighth grade at the Colegio Lucila Godoy. For a time, he belonged to the first fire company of San Miguel. In 2003 he took a course in media development. In 2004 he graduated from the Liceo Andrés Bello, giving the final speech of his generation and receiving honors. At 17 he entered the university to study law but abandoned his studies after learning three years.

=== Career ===
He began his career in television with the program SQP in January and February 2008, where he represented the Pokémon subculture.

In May 2008, he was invited by Chilevision's Yingo production to join the cast of the youth program and later signed a contract with the television station. He is currently a host on the program and also hosts Sin vergüenza, which airs on Saturdays and Sundays on Chilevision.

From the start of 2008, Lucero has been a regular panelist on the Radio Carolina program Pegao' a las Sabanas. He has co-hosted the show Domingo Poncea2 with Nicole Gomez since 2009. In 2011, he appeared in the first radio music video of Chile, Comunidad K.

In March 2010, Lucero starred in Amor Virtual, the first Chilevision mini-series. He was also a special guest on Teatro en Chilevisión. Later, in September 2010, he starred in Don Diablo, the second Chilevisión mini-series. He also starred in the mini-series Vampiras.

== Credits ==
Radio

- Pegao' a las Sabanas (2008)
- Domingo Poncea2 (2009–2010) Personality with co-hostess Nicole Gómez and Lia Lippi
- Comunidad K (2011–present) Personality

Television

- SQP (Sálvese quien pueda) (2008) Member
- Yingo (2008–13) Host
- Sin vergüenza (2010–present) Host
- Fiebre de baile 3 (2010) Contestant
- Sin uniforme (2014) Host
- Mucho Gusto (2015–2020) Panelist

Acting

- Nikolais, diario de un Pokémon (2007) Karol, Supporting role
- Teatro en Chilevisión (2010) Nicolás, Special guest
- Amor Virtual (2010) Mateo Robles, Lead Role
- Don diablo (2010) Ángel Bonilla Bonilla, Lead Role
- Vampiras (2011) Nicolás Zarricueta, Lead Role
- Graduados (2013) Himself, cameo

== Discography ==
Singles

- "Necesito de tu amor"
- "Me Fallaste"
- "Héroes de la Noche" (featuring Rodrigo Avilés)
- "De la amistad al amor"
- "Amor Virtual" (featuring Rodrigo Avilés and Gianella Marengo)
- "La roja va al Mundial" (featuring Rodrigo Avilés and Camilo Huerta)
- "Reggaeglobo" (featuring Rodrigo Avilés and Mariuxi Dominguez)
- "Chile Campeón" (featuring Felix Soumastre)
- "Lolita" (featuring C4)
