= Television in Chile =

Television is one of the major mass media of Chile. It was introduced in 1957.

There are 63 broadcast stations throughout the country (plus 121 repeaters) (1997). The broadcast television system used is NTSC.

The primary regulator of television content is the National Television Council (CNTV). The technical aspects are regulated by the Ministry of Transportation and Telecommunications, through the Undersecretariat of Telecommunications (Subtel).

== History ==
The first television transmission in Chile took place on October 5, 1957, from the Catholic University of Valparaíso's main campus, giving birth to UCV, the country's first television channel. Two years later, on August 21, 1959, the Catholic University of Chile made an experimental transmission between its main campus and the El Mercurio newspaper headquarters, both in Santiago's downtown, inaugurating the country's second channel, Canal 13, occupying frequency 2 for a few years (now 13).

Color television debuted on February 6, 1978. By the year 2000, there were about 800,000 pay television (cable and satellite) subscribers in the country, which then had a population of 15 million people.

Analog terrestrial signals were turned off on April 15, 2024, per a 2019 decision.

== Users ==
According to the 2002 census, 87% of Chilean households had at least one color television set. According to a November–December 2011 nationwide poll by CEP, 88.6% of Chilean households had at least one color television set, 0.9% didn't and 10.5% did not answer. Sixty percent of those households that said they owned at least one color TV set also said they had cable or satellite television.

== Cable/satellite television ==
In Chile, there are 1,138,718 cable television subscribers (55.3%) and 921,490 satellite television subscribers (44.7%) as of September 2011. The household penetration rate for cable and satellite television stands at 40.4% as of September 2011.

| Company | Type | Subscribers | Market share (September 2011) |
|---|---|---|---|
| Cable Central | Cable | 11,795 | 0.6% |
| DIRECTV Chile Ltda. | Satellite | 231,733 | 11.2% |
| PACIFICO CABLE S.A. | Cable | 52,645 | 2.6% |
| Telefónica del Sur | IP-TV | 46,175 | 2.2% |
| Telefónica Multimedia | Satellite | 369,848 | 18.0% |
| Claro Comunicaciones S.A. | Satellite, Cable | 414,620 | 20.1% |
| TU VES S.A. | Satellite | 18,065 | 0.9% |
| VTR Banda Ancha S.A. | Cable | 915,327 | 44.4% |
| Total subscribers | | 2,060,208 | 100.0% |

== Digital television ==
In late October 2008, the President submitted a bill to Congress detailing the legal framework for DTTV broadcasting in the country, but without defining which standard would be used.)

On 14 September 2009, Chile announced its decision to adopt the Japanese / Brazilian standard ISDB-T International with MPEG-4 for digital terrestrial television, joining Brazil, Argentina and Peru. The analog switchoff was scheduled for 2019. Chile had delayed its decision on which digital terrestrial television standard to adopt. As of 2021, a new schedule has been set for 2024

TVN, Chile's state-owned channel, has made digital terrestrial television broadcast tests since 1999. Canal 13 has been doing so since 2007 in Santiago only, transmitting in three DTV formats (ATSC, DVB and ISDB). In Valparaíso, UCV TV was to start in June 2010 demonstrative ISDB-Tb broadcasting for the Valparaíso/Viña del Mar area, using an 800 watts transmitter.

HDTV-ready television sets are widely sold in Chile, and cable and satellite television companies transmit limited HD content to its subscribers (27 HD channels in VTR (2 national-free, 4 Premiums, 21 basic), the country's largest cable TV provider).

== International channels ==
| Logo | Channel | Programming | Slogan | Participating channels | Owner | Payment operator company |
|---|---|---|---|---|---|---|
| | TV Chile | Generalist | Encontrémonos | TVN, Canal 24 Horas, NTV and TVN 3 | State of Chile | All (according to operator in Chile and by country) |

== Most viewed channels ==
| Position | Channel | Share of total viewing (%) |
|---|---|---|
| 1 | Chilevisión | 12.2 |
| 2 | Mega | 11.4 |
| 3 | TVN | 6.8 |
| 4 | Canal 13 | 5.8 |
| 5 | La Red | 3.1 |
| 6 | TV+ | 2.8 |
| 7 | CNN Chile | 2.0 |
| 8 | Telecanal | 1.3 |

== See also ==
- List of television stations in Chile
- Media of Chile
- Radio in Chile
