= Señal 3 La Victoria =

Chilean TV channel

- Country: Chile
- Headquarters: Población La Victoria, Santiago

Programming
- Language: Spanish

Ownership
- Key people: Luis Lillo (founder); Benjamin Lillo (director)

History
- Launched: October 30, 1997
- Former names: Canal Inmaculada Concepción Pichilemu

Links
- Website: Señal 3 La Victoria

Availability

Terrestrial
- Digital (La Victoria-Santiago): 47.1

Señal 3 La Victoria is a Chilean over-the-air community television station, based in Población La Victoria, a neighborhood in the commune of Pedro Aguirre Cerda, located in the city of Santiago. It is both Chile and Latin America's first community station, the station is part of Asociación Nacional de Canales Comunitarios de Chile.

== History ==
The origin of the station lies in youth members of the Manuel Rodríguez Patriotic Front, the Revolutionary Youth Movement (MIR) and the Lautaro Youth Movement. These three, after the Chilean transition to democracy, started to use media to awaken the audience, according to its founder Luis "Polo" Lillo.

In 1992, with an amplifier and a projector at the street, the group started making what they called "pantallazos" (public projections) once a month, airing events in areas such as La Victoria, which were not covered by traditional media. On October 30, 1997, the community station (Señal 3) started broadcasting as a non-profit social organization. Its coverage area was limited to a radius of nine kilometers, covering some 350,000 households, for a population of 800,000. Señal 3 La Victoria survived over the years thanks to support from neighbors of the La Victoria neighborhood. The station was pirate and even broadcast football matches and feature films without authorization. It also aired adult films during late night slots.

In 2003, Señal 3 La Victoria started an itinerary loan strategy of a transmitter to collectives and organizations interested in creating a community TV project in Chile.

On March 6, 2018, during the process to implement digital terrestrial television in Chile, the National Television Council granted the station a regular license, becoming one of the first four recipients for community television. With this, it started covering the communes of Pedro Aguirre Cerda, San Miguel, Lo Espejo, La Cisterna, San Joaquín, Cerrillos, Maipú, La Granja and Santiago. Using this license, Señal 3 started to abide by the law, due to the fact that, up until then, all of its activities were illegal, as Señal 3 still had no telecommunications license, ordered by Law nº. 18.168.

In 2021, founder and director Luis «Polo» Lillo died. His son Benjamín Lillo became the new director.

=== Francisca Sandoval case ===
On May 1, 2022, during one of the International Workers' Day marches, Señal 3 reporter and presenter Francisca Sandoval was at the Meiggs neighborhood carrying one of these rallies. From one moment to the other, a confrontation between protesters and supposed hawkers began. An armed group started shooting towards the protesters who were at the Alameda, wounding four people, including Francisca Sandoval, who received an impact from a bullet in her face and was urgently transferred to the former Posta Central (HUAP), where she died on May 12, 2022, becoming the first media personality in Chile to be assassinated since the return to democracy.

The culprit, Marcelo Naranjo, was sentenced to 24 years in jail for the murder of Francisca Sandoval on August 28, 2024.
