= La mañana de Chilevisión =

- Genre: Morning show
- Directed by: Alejandro Santelices
- Presented by: Julio César Rodríguez; Montserrat Alvarez
- Country of origin: Chile
- Original language: Spanish

Production
- Executive producer: Alejandro “Yuri” Santelices
- Producer: Patricia Vargas
- Running time: 4 hours

Original release
- Network: Chilevisión
- Release: February 29, 2012 – present

Related
- Gente como tú

La mañana de Chilevisión (English: The Morning of Chilevision) is a Chilean morning show that has aired on Chilevisión since February 29, 2012.

== Hosts ==
Current hosts

- Ignacio Gutierrez (since 2013)
- Carolina de Moras (since 2015)

Past hosts

- Eva Gómez (2012-2013)
- Cristián Sánchez (2012-2013)
- Carmen Gloria Arroyo (2013-2015)
