= 13C (TV channel) =

Chilean television channel

- Country: Chile
- Broadcast area: Chile
- Headquarters: Santiago, Chile

Programming
- Language: Spanish
- Picture format: 1080i HDTV (downscaled to 16:9 480i for the SDTV feed)

Ownership
- Owner: Canal 13 SpA; Grupo Luksic (through TV Medios Investments Ltd.)
- Sister channels: Canal 13; 13 Internacional; 13Rec; T13 En Vivo

History
- Launched: 15 July 1995
- Former names: UCTV Señal 3 (1995-1999); Canal 13 Cable (1999-2008)

Links
- Website: www.13c.cl

13C (formerly UCTV Señal 3 and Canal 13 Cable) is a Chilean subscription television channel, owned by the Luksic Group and operated by Secuoya Chile. Its programming is mainly based on cultural content, travel and food.

== History ==
=== Background and early years ===
Eleodoro Rodríguez Matte, executive director of Channel 13 in 1995, launches a project that seeks the international expansion of the channel. To do this, it created two signals from the channel, which were called UCTV Chile, distributed by satellite, and Señal 3, directed for cable television.

During the first years of transmission, Señal 3 rebroadcast old programming from Channel 13 until the appointment of Rodrigo Jordan as executive director of the network in August 1998. On June 18, 1999, Jordan renewed the channel's corporate image and on November 14 of that year, he renamed it Canal 13 Cable, under the direction of Juan Pablo Fresno Joannon for 2 years. The programming of that television station began to be based on cultural programs, as well as content referring to Chile and the international arena.

Finally, on November 14, 1999, the name changed from Channel 13 Signal 3 to Channel 13 Cable. Additionally, on September 27, 1999, the central news program Encuentro Noticioso changed its name to Tele13 Cable.

=== Relaunch as 13C, current situation ===
On July 11, 2008, after the arrival of journalist Mercedes Ducci to the executive management of Canal 13 in April 2007, Canal 13 Cable was renamed 13C, as well as its corporate image. At first, the channel was only available on the Movistar TV and VTR operators. In January 2010, it began to be distributed within the digital terrestrial television system, through channel 13.2 in Santiago, though its over-the-air signal was cut in September 2013, due to complaints from cable operators.

On October 21, 2014, 13C took the Teletrece C news program off the air to simultaneously broadcast the 9 p.m. central news program.

Since January 21, 2014, 13C is no longer available on Claro TV due to disagreements between Canal 13 executives and the cable and satellite television operator. On November 18, 2014, the signal was incorporated into the Porques cable operator.

After months of internal testing, 13C launched the channel's HD signal on May 1, 2015, available exclusively on Gtd and Telsur.5 As of July 1 of the same year, the channel joins the VTR grid.

Since June 3, 2016, after 2 years of leaving Claro TV's grid, 13C re-enters its programming along with its high definition signal.

Since September 15, 2017, 13C HD was made available on DirecTV nationwide.

On April 17, 2020, 13C arrives throughout the country (except Santiago) through VTR's analog signals, replacing VH1, and on June 30, 2020, it also arrives in Antofagasta, replacing Studio Universal.
