= Valentín Trujillo (pianist) =

Chilean musical artist

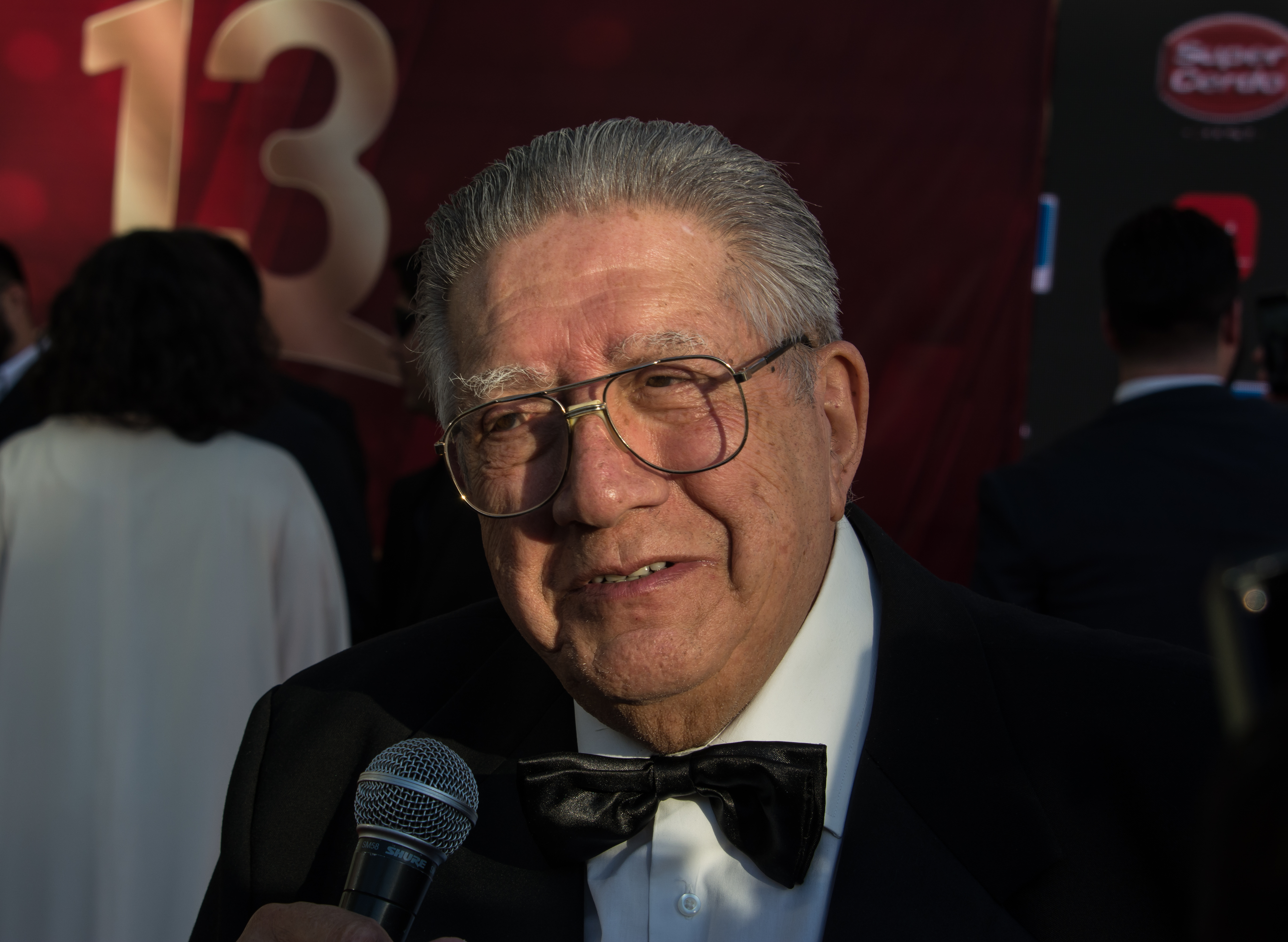
- Trujillo at Copihue de Oro, 2018

Background information
- Born: Valentín Trujillo Sánchez; May 2, 1933 (age 93); Santiago, Chile
- Origin: Chile
- Occupations: Pianist, conductor
- Years active: 1943-present

Valentín Trujillo Sánchez (born May 2, 1933), also known as "Maestro Valentín" or "Tío Valentín", is a Chilean pianist and arranger of popular music. He is known for his participation in television programs, including "Sábado Gigante".

== Early years ==
Trujillo was born in Santiago in 1933. His father was a miner and his mother a teacher. His older brother, Fernando Trujillo, was a popular singer of boleros, rancheras, and corridos.

Trujillo began to play piano at age three. He entered the Conservatorio Nacional de Música at age seven and continued to study there until 1952.

In 2004, he recorded the album Jazz de Salón with Cristián Cuturrufo. Three years later, he recorded the album Un año más with Ángel Parra Trío.

== Musical career ==
Trujillo released his first solo album, Un piano con alma, in 1958. In 1960, he received the award for "Best Accompanying Orchestra Director".

In 1962, he was hired as the conductor of the television program, "Sábado Gigante" on Canal 13. He continued in that role until the program was suspended in 1974 by the military dictatorship. The program was then renewed on an international basis, and Trujillo moved to Miami where the production resumed. He also participated in the television program, "El Mundo del Profesor Rossa" for several years until 1998.

In 2013, a biography of Trujillo, Valentín Trujillo: Una vida en la música, was written by Darío Oses.

== Politics ==
He has been affiliated with left politics for his entire life. He participated in the album X la CUT in 1968, published by the Juventudes Comunistas, and was a leader of the musicians' union. In March 2017, he signed for the Communist Party of Chile.

== Awards and honors ==
Trujillo won the Viña del Mar International Song Festival on several occasions. He has also received honors from the Sociedad de Críticos de Miami in 1992 and from the Chilean government in 2000 for career achievement. In 2010, he was honored at the Viña del Mar Festival with three prizes, a silver torch, a gold torch, and a gold seagull. In May 2016, he was named illustrious son of the city of Santiago. In September 2024 receives the National Prize for Musical Arts.

== Discography ==
=== Studio albums ===
- Un piano con alma (1958, EMI Odeon)
- Ritmos veraniegos (1960, EMI Odeon)
- Sáquela a bailar (1964, EMI Odeon)
- Bailando sencillito (1969, EMI Odeon)
- Valentín Trujillo (1990, CBS)
- Sí... soy chileno (2001)
- Jazz de salón (2004)
- Villancicos (2005, Perseguidor Records)
- Valentín y Pedro Amat Trujillo (2006, Oveja Negra)
- Un año más (2007)
- Íntimo (2011 - Edición independiente)
- Desde el alma (2012 - Oveja Negra)
- 90... y qué (2015 - Edición independiente)
- Piel de América vol. 1 (2015 - Edición independiente)
- Valentín Trujillo & Consuelo Schuster (2015 - Edición independiente)

=== Live and EP ===
- Piano y ritmo EP (1956, EMI Odeon)
- Al piano (2004, Sello Azul)

=== Collaborations ===
- X la CUT (1968, Dicap)
- Aprender es compartir (2009 - Edición independiente)
- Otra cosa es con guitarra (2011 - Chancho en Piedra)
