= Mucho gusto (TV program) =

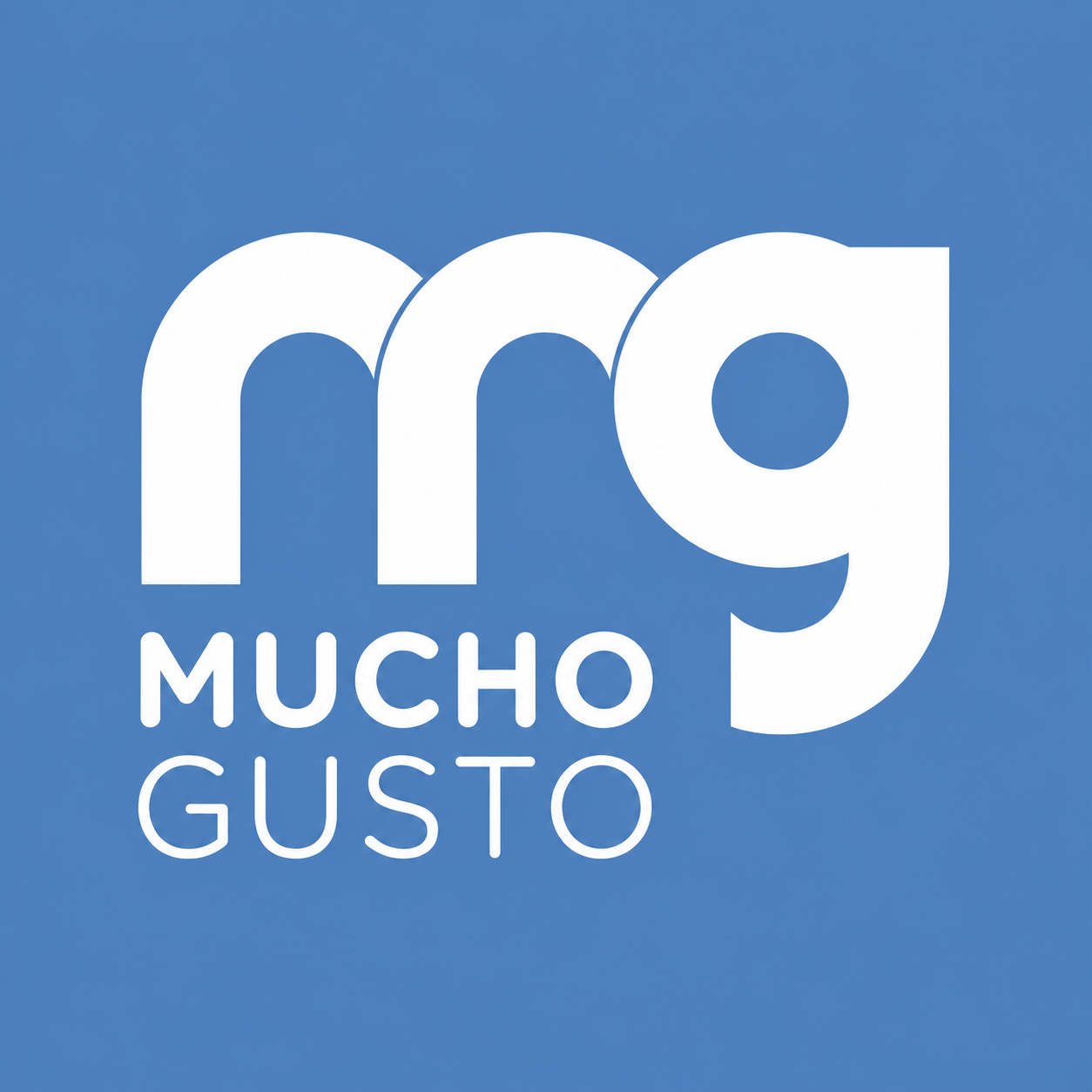
- Genre: Morning show
- Created by: Mega
- Directed by: Juan Pablo Sánchez
- Presented by: Karen Doggenweiler; José Antonio Neme
- Country of origin: Chile
- Original language: Spanish

Production
- Running time: 4 hours

Original release
- Network: Mega
- Release: 2001 – present

Mucho gusto (English: Nice to meet you) is a Chilean television morning show broadcast by Mega. It was first aired in 2001.

== Presenters ==
=== Current ===
- Karen Doggenweiler
- José Antonio Neme

=== Former ===
- Jose Miguel Viñuela
- Diana Bolocco
- Luis Jara
