= Diana Bolocco =

Chilean journalist (born 1977)

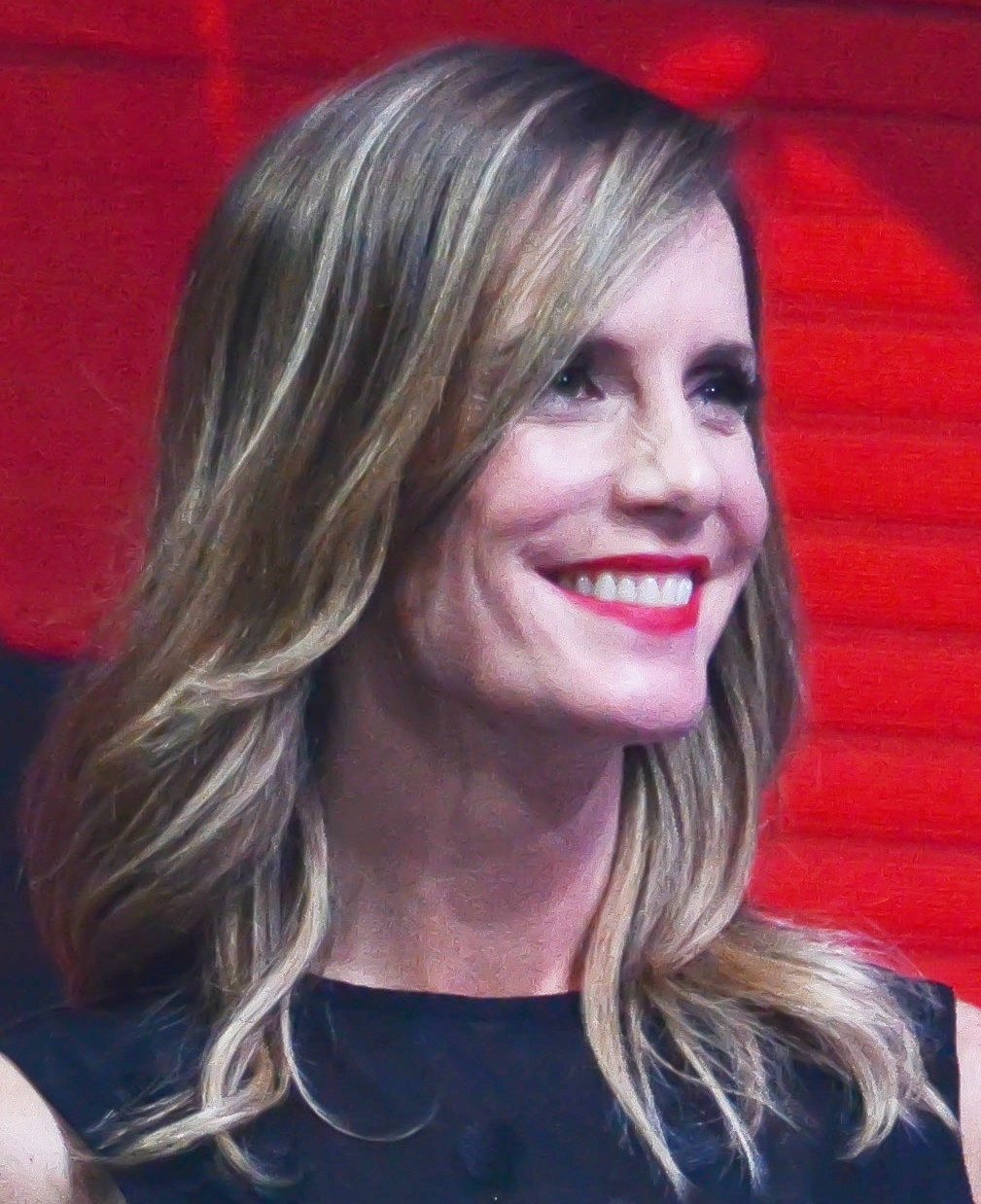
- Born: Diana Catalina Bolocco Fonck; 30 July 1977 (age 49); Santiago, Chile
- Occupations: Television presenter, journalist
- Partner(s): Gonzalo Cisternas (1998–2008); Cristián Sánchez (2013–present)
- Children: 4
- Parent(s): Enzo Bolocco Cintolesi; Rose Marie Fonck Assler
- Relatives: Cecilia Bolocco (sister)

Diana Catalina Bolocco Fonck (born 30 July 1977) is a Chilean journalist, known as sister of Cecilia Bolocco, Miss Universe 1987.

== Biography ==
Bolocco was born in Santiago, Chile, to businessman Enzo Bolocco Cintolesi, of Italian-Arbëreshë descent, and Rose Marie Fonck Assler, of German descent. She attended primary and secondary school at Santiago College. Her siblings are Cecilia, John Paul, Verónica, and Rodrigo (1986).

Her first television appearance was at age 9. She also appeared in an advertisement for the cosmetics brand Pamela Grant.

On 26 November 1999, she married Gonzalo Cisternas, with whom she had two sons, Pedro and Diego. After studying journalism at the Pontifical Catholic University of Chile in 2001, she was part of her sister Cecilia's website, but it was closed a year and a half later due to lack of funds. She also worked on the production of the show La Noche de Cecilia, broadcast by Megavisión.

In 2006, she separated from her husband and decided to devote herself to television. She debuted on the program Locos por el baile (2006) on Channel 13, where she served as a backstage reporter and co-host with Sergio Lagos.

She was named Queen of the XLVIII Viña del Mar International Song Festival in February 2007. On 15 October of the same year, the second season of Mad About Dance premiered, where Diana was the host alongside Sergio Lagos.

She continues to work on Channel 13 and will be international panel of judges at the Viña del Mar International Song Festival in 2010. In 2011, she hosted the program ¿Quién quiere ser millonario?: Alta tensión. She also started dating Cristián Sánchez.

From 2012 she and Martin Carcamo host Vértigo, a TV success that has kept them on the top of the Chilean TV business until now. Next year she married Cristian Sanchez, with whom she has two more children.
