= Ángel Parra Trío =

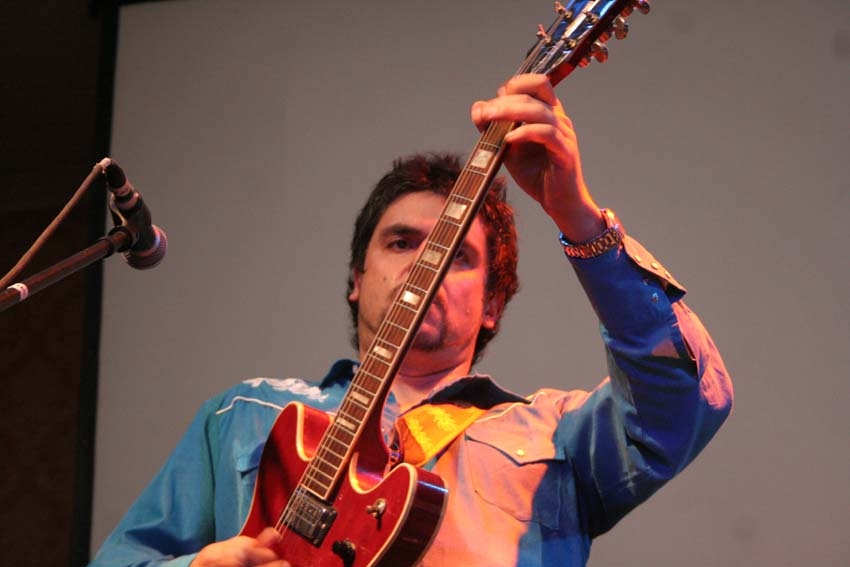
- Ángel Parra playing in 2008

Background information
- Origin: Santiago, Chile
- Genres: Jazz, jazz fusion, jazz rock, latin jazz, pop
- Years active: 1989–present

Ángel Parra Trío is a Chilean jazz band led by guitarist and composer Ángel Parra Jr. and created in 1989.

== History ==
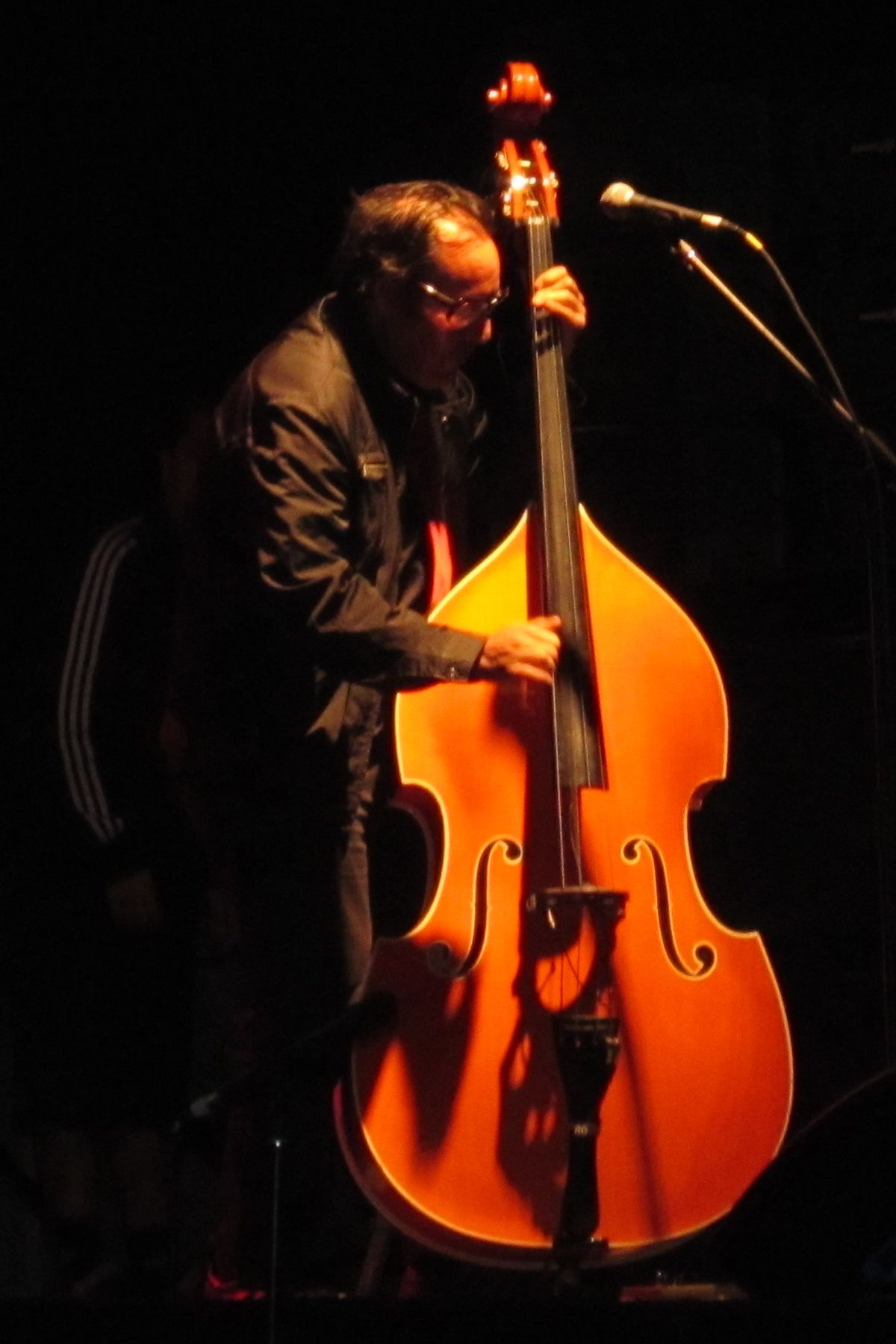
Roberto Lindl played the bass from 1991 to 2013.

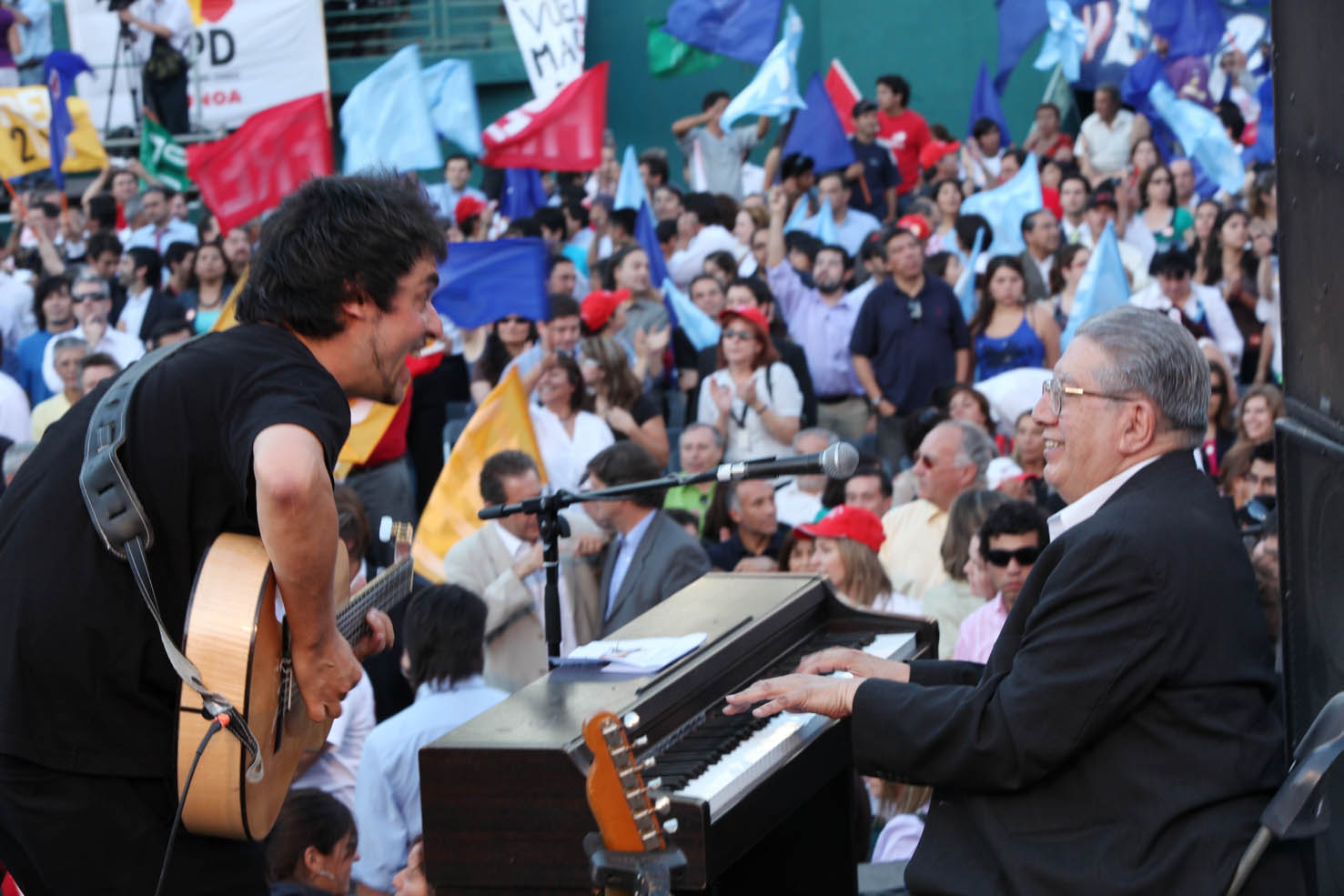
Ángel Parra along with Valentín Trujillo as guest.

Ángel Parra Trío consolidated itself as the first substantive project in the renovation of the Chilean jazz scene once the military regime collapsed and the mandatory silence ended. Given the permanent musical reinvention that made it possible for a long time, the group also catapulted Parra beyond the territories of rock, through his militancy in the group Los Tres, and put his name among the most popular Chilean guitarists.

The prehistory of the famous jazz trio dates back to the late '80s, when the jazz-rock group Cometa was experiencing its last moments before becoming La Marraqueta. Parra, who had replaced guitarist Edgardo Riquelme in the group, summoned two of its original members in 1989 to work in a small jazz workshop. Bassist Pablo Lecaros and drummer Pedro Greene joined the first sketch of Parra's trio, which at that time balanced the jazz standard repertoire, certain original compositions by Roberto Parra Sandoval with electrified jazz-rock format.

Shortly after, the trio consolidated in bop jazz with the inclusion of double bass player Roberto Lindl and drummer Francisco Molina (initiated into jazz in Concepción by pianist Marlon Romero). The first stable formation of the Ángel Parra Trío was propitiated, precisely, with these sidemen from Los Tres, who took advantage of a break for the group due to the tour that its leader Álvaro Henríquez made in 1991 to Europe together with the theatre company Gran Circo Teatro. With this line-up, and with Parra already immersed in the music of soloists such as Barney Kessel or Joe Pass, the group recorded their debut for Alerce: Ángel Parra Trío (1992).

In 1994, Molina left the group to form and lead Los Titulares, and then drummer Moncho Pérez, also from Concepción, joined. The band did not take long to establish itself as a jazz reference within a scene undergoing reconstruction. This new formation recorded the albums Patana (1995) and Piscola standards (1996), alternating original music and pieces by classical composers, with a tendency towards swing and bop languages over the predominant fusion.

The next album, Tequila (1998), opened the doors for the trio to new sources of expression. Straight ahead jazz was then insufficient and the magnetism of popular music had already had an effect on Parra and Lindl. Together with Los Tres they had both played music by Lalo Parra and exchanged ideas with jazz players from the old guard such as the pianist Rafael Traslaviña or the double bass player Iván Cazabón. This new album included tango accordionist Rafael "Rabanito" Berríos (who had even played with Violeta Parra in her youth).

No Junta Ni Pega (2000) already had keyboardists Raúl Morales and Camilo Salinas in the group's ranks, emulating part of Los Ángeles Negros-type sound. Technically, the Ángel Parra Trío became a quintet, but kept its name as an unmistakable brand. With both musicians specializing in these old Rhodes keyboard sounds, Hammond and Bonanza, the band began their foray into lounge music and psychedelic pop, especially when they added singer Julián Peña (ex Los Santos Dumont) to their staff. By then, Los Tres was over and both Parra and Lindl diverted their vocation and experience to work with the trio.

In that context, the band recorded their first album with Warner, the double volume live La hora feliz (2002), with an army of guests at a concert at the Teatro Oriente, and then Vamos que se puede (2003), album whose sonic inspiration was the figure of the pop guitarist of the 60s Óscar Arriagada. The trio recorded a new album with this masterful soloist, Playa solitaria (2005), this time for the La Oreja label. It included some songs that Arriagada had transformed into hits in the '60s (in addition to the participation of Los Prisioneros' Jorge González), closing a period of great popular success and musical opening that meant the affection of an audience not exactly related to jazz.

The return of Los Tres to the album Hágalo usted mismo, 2006 forced Parra and Lindl to suspend the project for a season, but already in 2007 he was reactivated to work with the old-school guitarist Panchito Cabrera and the popular pianist Valentín Trujillo and record his ninth album, Un año más (2007). The group also added jazz drummer Andy Baeza to the lineup, replacing a historic Moncho Pérez, now established in Valparaíso, leader of his own bop quartet and head of the new porteño jazz scene. Shortly after, the group worked with the same Valentín Trujillo, but added other heroes from the capital's bohemian era of the 1940s and 1950s, such as the saxophonist Mickey Mardones, the trumpeter Ricardo Barrios and the tumbador Adelqui Silva for a new chosen repertoire of the time and a revitalization of that sound in Espérame !!! (2009).

Parra's side project called Ángel Parra y Los Fugitivos, in 2011 summoned a jazz sextet with people like Sebastián Jordán (trumpet), Agustín Moya (tenor sax) and Lautaro Quevedo (piano), once again kept the work of the Ángel Parra Trío suspended. At the end of 2013, the guitarist took up the project, residing then as a consequence of the internal problems that were experienced with his fellow members of Los Tres. At the end of 2013, the guitarist took up the project, residing then as a consequence of the internal problems that were experienced with his fellow members of Los Tres. The departure of Parra from the rock band was joined by the retirement of Roberto Lindl from the jazz group after 22 years of activity. Parra thus summoned the jazz and funk pianist Ariel Pino, and together with Andy Baeza he reorganized the band as a Hammond organ trio. With them and notable guest such as Valentín Trujillo on piano, Roberto Trujillo on bass, and Consuelo Schuster on voice, Parra made a new live album entitled Dulce compañía in 2015, with a mixture of classic swing and hot jazz with some of his jazz arrangements of her grandmother Violeta Parra's music.

== Discography ==
- 1992 - Ángel Parra Trío
- 1995 - Patana
- 1996 - Piscola Standards
- 1998 - Tequila!!!
- 2000 - No junta ni pega
- 2003 - Vamos que se puede
- 2005 - Playa solitaria
- 2008 - Un año más
- 2009 - Espérame (with Valentín Trujillo)

=== Live ===
- 2002 - La hora feliz
- 2016 - Dulce compañía

=== Collectives ===
- 2005 - Tour verano 2005 (con Ángel Parra y Ventiscka)

== Members ==
- Ángel Parra Jr., guitar (1989–present).
- Andy Baeza, drums (2007–present).
- Ariel Pino, organ (2013–present).

=== Former members ===
- Pablo Lecaros, bass (1989 - 1990).
- Pedro Greene, drums (1989 - 1991).
- Roberto Titae Lindl, bass (1991 - 2013).
- Pancho Molina, drums (1991 – 1994).
- Moncho Pérez, drums (1994 - 2007).
- Raúl Morales, keyboards (1998 - 2005).
- Camilo Salinas, keyboards (1998 - 2002).
- Julián Peña, voice (2002 - 2004).
