= Yes Sir, That's My Baby (song) =

1925 song by Walter Donaldson (music) and Gus Kahn (lyrics)

- Sheet music cover, 1925

Song
- Published: 1925 by Irving Berlin Inc.
- Genre: Pop standard
- Label: Victor 19656
- Composer: Walter Donaldson
- Lyricist: Gus Kahn

"Yes Sir, That's My Baby" is a popular U.S. song from 1925. The music was written by Walter Donaldson and the lyrics by Gus Kahn.

On January 1, 2026, the 1925 recordings of the song entered the public domain in the United States.

== Background ==
The chorus begins, "Yes sir, that's my baby, no sir, don't mean maybe. Yes sir, that's my baby now."

According to one source, the song was written when Donaldson and Kahn were visiting Eddie Cantor. Cantor's daughter Marjorie brought out one of her favorite toys, a walking mechanical pig. She wound it up and it started walking in rhythm while two notes kept coming from the little creature. Kahn was inspired and started working lyrics to these notes in rhythm with the pig, coming up with the title and opening line of the chorus in short order.

== 1925 recordings ==
Successful 1925 recordings include:

- Margaret Young
- Ace Brigode
- Gene Austin with Billy "Uke" Carpenter
- Blossom Seeley
- Yes Sir, That's My Baby, Gene Austin recording published 1925.
  Ben Bernie
- Coon-Sanders Original Nighthawk Orchestra (vocal by Carleton Coon).
- Lee Morse

== Later recordings ==
The song is a standard that has been recorded by hundreds of artists in various genres, including:

- Eddie Cantor recorded the song in 1930.
- Harry Stewart's mock-Japanese novelty cover of the song earned a notorious reputation as one of the worst records ever made upon its release in 1953.
- Bing Crosby recorded the song in 1956 for use on his radio show and it was subsequently included in the box set The Bing Crosby CBS Radio Recordings (1954-56) issued by Mosaic Records (catalog MD7-245) in 2009.
- Also in 1956, The Sensations reached #15 on the Best Sellers in Stores chart.
- It was later a hit for Ricky Nelson in 1960. This recording reached #34 on the Hot 100.
- The Four Aces recorded the song in 1957.
- It's the opening track on Etta Jones' Don't Go to Strangers (1960).
- In 1960 the trombonist Mario Pezzotta and his soloists recorded an instrumental version (Durium Records, ECGE 75153), a single released in Spain, Greece and Italy, included in the 1980 album Solo per ballare (Just to dance) (Durium Records, 60005), published in Greece.
- A one off music group, Hale & the Hushabyes (Sonny Bono, Cher, Jackie DeShannon, Darlene Love, Brian Wilson, and Edna Wright) recorded the song in 1964 with Wright singing lead and Jack Nitzsche producing.
- Frank Sinatra recorded it in 1966 for his Strangers in the Night LP.
- James Booker covered the song on his album Classified: Remixed & Expanded.

== International re-recordings ==
- A Yiddish version entitled "Yes Sir, Iz May Kalleh" (Yes Sir, That's My Bride) was recorded by Peisachke Burstein. In German, the song was titled "Küss' mich, Schnucki-Putzi".
- In 1956 Bruno and his Quirinetta orchestra recorded in Italian the song entitled Il vero charleston "Lola" (The Real Charleston "Lola"), with lyrics by Borella, (CGD, ND 9006).
- The song was also sung by Jason Robards and Barry Gordon in the 1965 feature film A Thousand Clowns.
- Bram Morrison and young singer Debbie Fruitman sing together on Sharon, Lois & Bram's album One Elephant, Deux Éléphants.
- The song was sung in Italian by Duo Fasano (Fasano sisters duo) and the famous Italian singer Raffaella Carrà in 1973. The song was titled "Lola" and talks about a girl (Lola) that the singer is convincing to dance the Charleston.
- It was also remade by a Czech group Verona in 2011 with completely new lyrics and named "Hey Boy", becoming a holiday hit on local radio stations. Czech and Slovak listeners know the song from the traffic-information program "Pozor, zákruta" (Watch out, turning), which has been broadcast since 1966 by Czechoslovak Radio, which took the instrumental version of that song as its signature. With older Czech lyrics titled "Že se nestydíte" by Jan Werich this song was performed by the Karel Vlach orchestra in the Rokoko theatre (Prague, 1963).
- The Swedish band Onkel Kånkel recorded a version of the song called "Spetälske Leffe" (Leprous Leffe) for their 1990 album Kalle Anka Suger Pung.
- The song's title is the name of a spaceship in the John Scalzi book The Collapsing Empire, often referred to as "the Yes, Sir".
- A French version entitled "Chacun son truc" (To Each His Own) was recorded by Maurice Chevalier in 1926 with completely new lyrics by Paul Briquet. "Le baryton populaire" Louis Lynel records the song under Belgium label "Chantal De Luxe". Supposed that this song was also performed by Tino Rossi, but no full records were found, only in medley. In 1956 Pierre Arvay and his orchestra recorded the same Charleston entitled now "C'est elle qui ordonne" (It Is She Who Orders) for their album "Chansons 1925". The song was sung by Christian Duvaleix, the French actor, director, and screenwriter. This album was also released in 2011.
- Walter Donaldson's music was used as an exercise in Russian children's music schools and was entitled "Каникулы" (Holidays).
- It was adapted to Spanish by Roberto Parra (Chilean singer-songwriter) and recorded in 1995 by Los Tres (Chilean rock band) under the title "Quién Es La Que Viene Allí" (Who's Coming Down) for their live acoustic album Los Tres MTV Unplugged
- Tipica 73 quotes the main refrain for the song in a segment of its version of the Cuban song “Amalia Batista.”

== Film appearances ==
- 1942 Broadway
- 1944 Once Upon a Time – played often throughout the film
- 1949 Yes Sir, That's My Baby – sung during the montage with the kids.
- 1951 I'll See You in My Dreams
- 1953 The Eddie Cantor Story – sung by Eddie in the Midnight Frolics
- 1965 A Thousand Clowns – sung and played on ukuleles by Jason Robards and Barry Gordon.
- 1974 The Great Gatsby
- 1975 Smile – sung by Michael Chain
- 1979 Agatha
- 1986 Heartburn – performed by Meryl Streep and Jack Nicholson.
- 1998 Dancing at Lughnasa
