= Cristián Cuturrufo =

Chilean trumpeter (1972–2021)

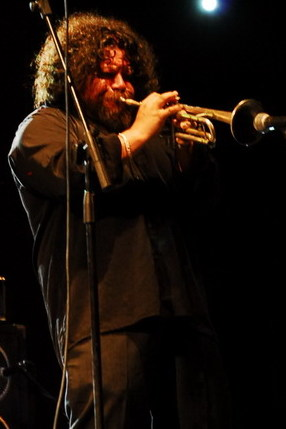
Cristián Cuturrufo

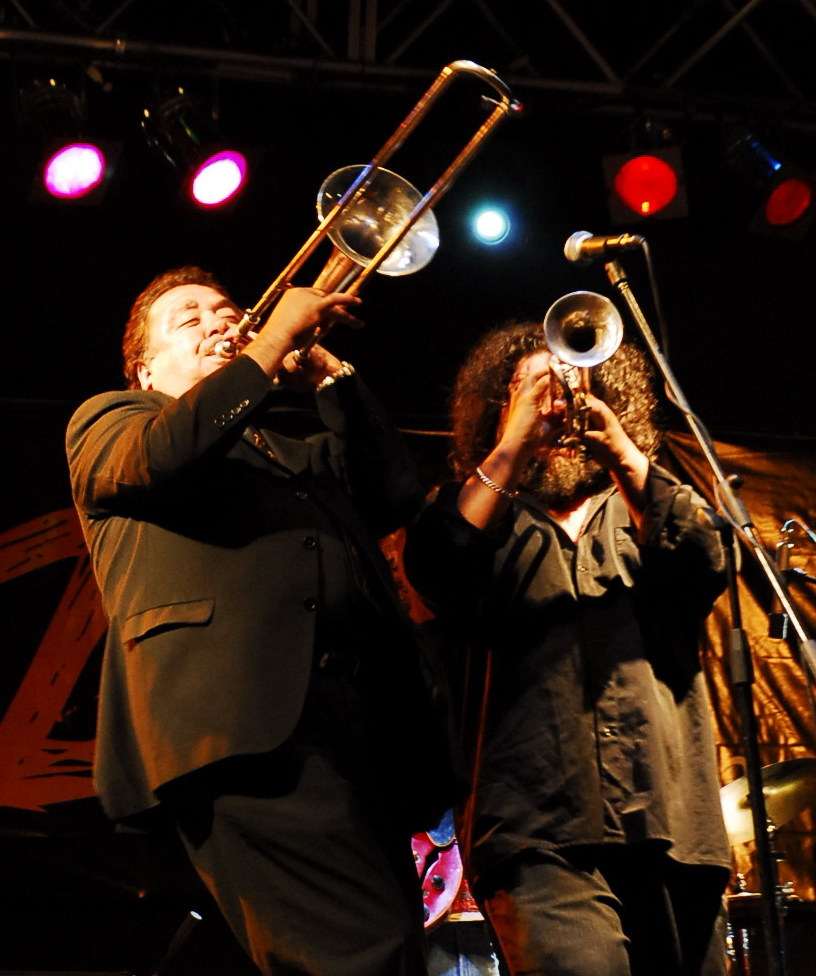
Cuturrufo with Héctor Parquímetro Briceño

Christian Alejandro Cuturrufo Contador (27 June 1972 – 19 March 2021) was a Chilean musician and cultural manager, and one of the most prominent jazz trumpeters in his country.

He died from COVID-19 in Santiago on 19 March 2021.

== Career ==
He was born in Coquimbo, in a family of musicians headed by his father, Wilson Cuturrufo, who was an accordionist. His family was always linked to the musical traditions of the port and the popular festivals of the region.

He studied classical trumpet at the Jorge Peña Hen Experimental School of Music with Professor Sergio Fuentes in La Serena, parallelly discovering music such as Return to Forever, Kool & the Gang, Cole Porter and the Chilean Orquesta Huambaly. Later he continued his training at the Catholic University of Chile, later he traveled to Cuba to deepen his studies of popular music, Afro-Cuban rhythms and jazz, inspired by soloists like Fats Navarro, Dizzy Gillespie and Arturo Sandoval.

Once in Chile, he participated in Latin jazz groups such as Motuto, to later be part of numerous jazz bands in a career that led him to develop the structure of the jazz quintet.

Among the many jazz musicians with whom he shared the stage in his quintets were the saxophonists Ignacio González, Jimmy Coll and David Pérez, the guitarists Jorge Díaz, Daniel Lencina and Federico Dannemann, the bassists Felipe Chacón, Christian Gálvez and Cristián Monreal, and the drummers Iván Lorenzo, Carlos Cortés and Andrés Celis, among others. He also joined Francisco Molina's Los Titulares, Vernáculo and Cutus-Clan along with his brother Rodrigo Cuturrufo. In addition frequently collaborated with Ángel Parra Trío, from Los Tres' guitarist Ángel Parra.

He also worked alongside the legendary old-guard pianist Valentín Trujillo. Along with the popular piano teacher, Cuturrufo acquired a better position in terms of popular and massive musical repertoires performing swing duets that he recorded on the albums Jazz de salon (2004) and Villancicos (2005).

After a while he returns to his original style, but this time fusing jazz with funk creating the album Cristián Cuturrufo and the Latin Funk (2006), with his usual sextet and also developing the Chilean swing with Swing nacional (2007) together with the trombonist Héctor "Parquímetro" Briceño.

During 2009, the trumpeter made news again with an extensive tour of New Zealand and Southeast Asia, to favourable reviews. In the middle of 2009, he published his first jazz anthology, entitled Thirty Years on Trumpet and in January 2010 he appeared for the first time at the Providencia International Jazz Festival commanding a multinational ensemble of eleven musicians including his swing colleague Jimmy Coll (tenor saxophone soloist), Claudio Rubio (section tenor sax), Eduardo Peña (electric bass) and Carlos Cortés (drums), who again addressed Afro-Cuban music and Latin jazz.

In 2015, he declared himself against the SCD (Chilean Society of Musical Authors and Interpreters) for being "very shady". In the same interview he stated that he considered himself more than a jazz player, a musician who enjoyed traditional cumbia, jazz, and rock-pop, and that he detested reggaeton, bachata, and romantic cumbia.

From that moment on, he dedicated more time to his role as producer of musical encounters and events such as the Las Condes Jazz Festival created in 2005, in Parque Padre Hurtado, in addition to the creation of jazz clubs such as The Jazz Corner in Barrio Italia (where he played alongside many figures such as Wynton Marsalis or Esperanza Spalding) and Boliche Jazz in 2017. His next album was with the stellar cast who recorded a concert at the Blue Note Jazz Club in New York, along with Christian Gálvez, Nelson Arriagada and Alejandro Espinosa, a record published by the Pez label under the title The Chilean Project live at the Blue Note (2016).

After a long time of not publishing albums at the rhythm that he had been offering, the trumpeter presented a work entitled Socos (2019), where he presented a single new composition ("Socos"). By that time, already residing in the capital's Ecological Community of Peñalolén, he joined the musicians Jorge Campos (bass) and Pedro Greene (drums), with whom he arrived at the Cairo Jazz Festival, in Egypt in 2020, in which it would be his last tour. This project would be shown in Chile at the Las Condes Jazz Festival held in December 2020.

The last gig he performed was in early March 2021 with The Chilean Project via streaming for the Rosita Renard Festival of the Municipality of Pirque held at the Castillo de las Majadas.

== Personal life and death ==
He was married to cultural producer Magdalena Cousiño, with whom he had three children.

On 17 March 2021, the information was he had reportedly fallen ill with COVID-19 along with his partner, being therefore admitted in critical condition to the Las Condes Clinic in Santiago. The hospitalization occurred following two cardiorespiratory arrests due to complications derived from the contagion, for which he was transferred to the clinic by helicopter from his house in Peñalolén. He died on 19 March 2021, at the age of 48.

One of his last public activities occurred on 12 March, when he participated in the Patricio Fernández's campaign in Vitacura, within the framework of his candidacy for the Constitutional Convention election.

== Discography ==
- 2000 - Puro jazz (Big Sur)
- 2002 - Latin jazz (Big Sur)
- 2003 - Recién salido del horno (Big Sur)
- 2004 - Jazz de salón (Autoedición)
- 2005 - Villancicos (Perseguidor Records)
- 2006 - Cristián Cuturrufo y la Latin Funk (Autoedición)
- 2007 - Swing nacional (Fondart)
- 2010 - Cutu! (Autoedición)
- 2016 - The Chilean Project live at the Blue Note (Pez)
- 2019 - Socos
