= Fome =

Studio album by Los Tres
- Released: June 25, 1997
- Recorded: 1997
- Studios: Bearsville Studios, United States
- Genres: Rock; Rockabilly; Alternative rock
- Length: 50:32
- Labels: Columbia; Sony Music Chile
- Producers: Los Tres; Joe Blaney

Los Tres chronology
La Yein Fonda (1996)	Fome (1997)	Peineta (1998)

Singles from Fome
- 1. "Bolsa de Mareo" Released: 1997; 2. "Olor a Gas" Released: 1997; 3. "La Torre de Babel" Released: 1997

Fome (Spanish: [ˈfo.me], lit. 'Boring') is the fourth studio album by Chilean rock band Los Tres, released on June 25, 1997, through Sony Music Chile. The album comprises fifteen tracks and was produced by the band alongside Joe Blaney, who had previously worked with them on MTV Unplugged (1996). The cover for the album contains an advertisement from the Spanish encyclopedia Monitor, released during the sixties.

The album has been considered as the best from the band's discography by many critics as well as by Álvaro Henríquez himself. The Chilean edition of Rolling Stone included the album in their 50 Best Chilean Album list, released in 2008, placing it at number 29. It has sold almost 40,000 copies to date.

== Background ==
The album was conceived following the huge commercial success and international exposure that the 1996 MTV Unplugged album brought to the band, Fome was recorded at Bearsville Studios, in Woodstock, New York and was produced by the band alongside Joe Blaney, who produced their MTV live album, the mixing and mastering of the album was done at Sony Music Studios in New York. Prior to the recording in the United States, the band recorded several demos of the songs from the album during a retreat to Cajón del Maipo in Chile. The album spawned the singles "Bolsa de Mareo", "Olor a Gas" and "La Torre de Babel".

Unlike their acoustic MTV live album, Fome is a more "electric" album in its recording, Henríquez has said that "we wanted to have the sound of a band that played live but inside a studio, I mean, a sound as if we were playing together but with the help of technology, we want it to be spontaneous and fresh".

== Composition ==
The album is composed by fifteen tracks, including two instrumentals composed by Roberto Lindl, one at the beginning of the album ("Claus") and the other at the end ("Largo"). The recording of the album was marked by the widening of the range of instruments used by the band, for example in "Olor a Gas" were Ángel Parra plays the lap steel guitar, and the experimentation with the instruments that each member played with "Claus" having Henríquez, who usually plays the guitar, opening with drums, Francisco Molina in the bass and Roberto Lindl in the hammond organ.

According to Joe Blaney, the producer of the album, different influences range throughout the album, saying that "there are hard rock songs like "Libreta", "Antes", or "Bolsa de Mareo", the latter with that guitar solo, there is very colorful and pop stuff, some more acoustic like "Me Arrendé", I think the sound of this song it unique, is grandeous, there is also something fun in "Silencio" and "Torre de Babel"; "Restorán" is almost a punk song, and then there are the instrumentals at the beginning and end, closing the work ". Henríquez said that English rock band The Kinks served as inspiration for the sound of the album, commenting that "in Fome there is not a rock of paraphernalia, a muscular or demonstrative one, instead there is an austere and precise rock like the one by The Kinks, I think we achieved it".

Themes of pain, heartbreak and death run through the album. According to Jimena Henríquez, sister of Álvaro, as well as other musicians close to the band during the time of recording the album, many of the songs in Fome are inspired by the end of the relationship between Álvaro and Chilean singer Javiera Parra in addition to the alleged infidelities by Parra, hence the dark themes and the angsty lyrics by Henríquez.

The song "Bolsa de Mareo" ("Puke Bag" or "Motion Sickness Bag") was chosen by the band as the album's first single because they considered it as a good representative of what the album was about, the song and its name come from "the sensation of always being without knowing where to hold on", a sensation which Henríquez likened to the one he felt during a plane flight. The second single, "Olor a Gas" ("Smell of Gas"), could possibly be about the aftermath of a suicide with lyrics like "Sin sábanas, sin un colchón, duerme tranquilo como un lirón, seco el corazón" ("Without bed sheets, without a mattress, sleep calmly like a dormouse, the heart gets dry"). The third single, "La Torre de Babel" ("The Tower of Babel"), has no relation to the origin myth about the creation of the languages in the world, but instead, it is a fable created by the band inspired by different Chilean tales and tells the story of Gabriel, a young cigarette that loves to swim at the river which ultimately leads him to his death, the music video of the song was an animated video directed by Alejandro Rojas, featuring characters designed by Samuel Restucci, that illustrates the story of the song, the music video is one of the most recognized by the band as well as one of the first animated music videos in Chile.

== Track listing ==
All tracks were produced by Los Tres and Joe Blaney.

Fome track listing
No.	Title	Writer(s)	Length
1.	"Claus"	Roberto Lindl	1:44
2.	"Bolsa de Mareo"	Álvaro Henríquez	3:36
3.	"Toco Fondo"	Henríquez; Lindl	2:58
4.	"Olor a Gas"	Henríquez; Lindl; Ángel Parra	3:43
5.	"De Hacerse se va a Hacer"	Henríquez	2:45
6.	"Antes"	Henríquez; Lindl	3:44
7.	"Fealdad"	Henríquez	2:50
8.	"Jarabe para la Tos"	Henríquez	3:39
9.	"Libreta"	Henríquez; Lindl	4:48
10.	"Me Arrendé"	Henríquez	3:31
11.	"Silencio"	Henríquez	2:19
12.	"La Torre de Babel"	Henríquez	3:32
13.	"Pancho"	Henríquez	5:02
14.	"Restorán"	Henríquez; Lindl; Parra; Francisco Molina	4:00
15.	"Largo"	Lindl	2:21
Total length:			50:32

== Critical reception ==
The album has been considered by different music critics as the best album from the band, Pablo Retamal from La Tercera called it their best album writing that "Fome is a well-rounded album that has the intention to transmit a direct message of pain, sourness and uneasiness, all of the songs, both in their lyrics as well as in their sound are coherent with that message, it is something that does not happen in any other moment within Los Tres discography". Emilio Contreras from Futuro called it "the hightest creative point of Los Tres", considering that the album exceeded the high expectations that the band faced following the success of their previous albums, with Fome achieving a proper sound and character as an album.

Álvaro Henríquez called the album as the best from the band, saying that "I think it's the epythome of Los Tres, it's not the juice but the pulp of our music, I think it's a very coherent album with very strong lyrics and content", also considering it a good representation of the identity of the band, commenting that "if it hadn't been clear to someone how we were as a group, on this album it was made very clear". Joe Blaney has called the album "the highest point of the band" as well as "one of the best albums I have produced".

The album was included in the list of 50 Best Chilean Albums at number 29, released by the Chilean edition of the American magazine Rolling Stone on 2008, the list was voted by several Chilean musicians and music critics.

=== All-time lists ===
Publication	Country	List	Year	Rank	Ref.
Rolling Stone	Chile	50 Best Chilean Albums	2008	29	

== Credits ==
=== Los Tres ===
- Álvaro Henríquez – vocals, guitar, drums
- Ángel Parra – guitar, bass, backing vocals
- Roberto Lindl – double-bass, bass, accordion, organ, backing vocals
- Francisco Molina – drums, bass

=== Technical ===
- Joe Blaney – recording, engineering
- Scott Gormley – assistant engineer
- Paul Schiavo – assistant engineer
- Jim "J. Blunt" Caruana – assistant engineer
- Vlado Meller – mastering
