= Parra family =

The Parra family is a Chilean family known for its many artists. Members of the Parra family are noted contributors to Chilean culture with many members being distinguished national artists. The family is not closely related to the Parra Pizarro brothers, members of the Chilean rock fusion group Los Jaivas.

== Family members ==
=== First generation ===
- Nicanor Parra (1914-2018) - Physicist and self-styled "anti-poet"
- Hilda Parra (1914-1975) - Folklorist artist, toured with Violeta as "Las Hermanas Parra"
- Violeta Parra (1917-1967) - Folklore singer and composer
- Eduardo "Lalo" Parra (1918-2009) - Folklore singer and musician
- Roberto Parra (1921-1995) - Folklore musician
- Lautaro Parra (1928-2013) - Folklore musician
- Óscar Parra (1931-2016) - Clown

=== Second generation ===
- Isabel Parra (b. 1939) - Folklore music singer
- Catalina Parra (b. 1940) - Visual artist
- Ángel Parra (1943 - 2017) - Musician
- Clarita Parra (b. 1948) - Folklore musician
- Colombina Parra (b. 1970)
- Juan de Dios Parra (b. 1972)
- Nano Parra - Folklore Musician
- Nicanor Jr Parra (Baez)

Folklore musician

=== Third generation ===
- Cristóbal "Tololo" Ugarte (b. 1992) - Artist, Architect
- Tita Parra (b. 1956) - Folklore music singer
- Ángel Parra Jr. (b. 1966) - Rock and jazz musician; member of rock group Los Tres
- Javiera Parra (b. 1968) - Musician; member of Chilean pop/rock band Javiera y Los Imposibles
- Pedro Soler Parra (b. 1960) - Artist
- Isabel Soler Parra (b. 1962) -Artist
- Juan Andres Soler Parra (b. 1963) - Artist; member of the American Sommelier Society

=== Fourth generation ===
- Antar Parra (1985-2010) - Guitarist
- Mariana Parra (b. 1991) - Artist
- Felipe Parra (b.1991) - Engineer, Guitarist

== See also ==
- Music of Chile
