= Los Tres (album) =

Studio album by Los Tres
- Released: September 4, 1991
- Recorded: 1991
- Studio: Filmocentro Studios
- Genre: Rockabilly; Alternative rock; Jazz rock
- Length: 40:34
- Label: Alerce
- Producer: Carlos Necochea

Los Tres chronology
Los Tres (1991)	Se Remata el Siglo (1995)

Singles from Los Tres
- 1. "He Barrido el Sol" Released: 1991; 2. "Un Amor Violento" Released: 1991; 3. "La Primera Vez" Released: 1991; 4. "Pájaros de Fuego" Released: 1992

Los Tres is the debut studio album by Chilean rock band Los Tres, released on September 4, 1991, through Alerce. The album contains ten songs, all produced by Carlos Necochea and written by the members of the band, mainly Álvaro Henríquez. The artwork for the cover is the painting "Actresses" by Georgian painter Lado Gudiashvili.

The project contains some of the band's most well known songs, such as "Un Amor Violento" and "He Barrido el Sol". The album is considered as one of the albums that reactivated Chilean rock during the early 1990s following a decade marked by pop music in the country.

American magazine Al Borde placed the album at number 151 in their list of 250 Most Important Albums of Iberoamerican Rock, released in 2006, being one of the three albums by the band to appear on the list. The Chilean edition of Rolling Stone included the album in their 50 Best Chilean Album list, released in 2008, placing it at number 20.

== Background ==
The band began in 1982, with Álvaro Henríquez, Roberto "Titae" Lindl and Francisco "Pancho" Molina as the members while all three were attending to Charles de Gaulle School in Concepción, Chile, after going through several name changes as well as adding different members, the band finally became fully formed following the inclusion of Ángel Parra in 1988, staying with the name Los Tres ("The Three"), even through they were now a four-member band. In 1991, they released the album through the label Alerce, premiering it in a party at the restaurant Le Trianon in Santiago, while at first the album was mainly performed at college bars and pubs, it slowly began receiving attention, being supported by Chilean radio Rock & Pop, initially with the song "La Primera Vez", which allowed them to gradually enter the mainstream.

The album was recorded at Filmocentro Studios in Santiago and was produced in its entirely by Carlos Necochea. About naming the album with the name of the band, Henríquez said "I always felt that the album was a presentation of us, we were presenting ourselves to society". Following the success of the album, Jorge Melibosky from Sony Music approached the band to buy their contract with Alerce, the band accepted, allowing them to start expanding their career to international markets.

== Composition ==
All of the song were written by Álvaro Henríquez, with Roberto Lindl having songwriting credits in "Sudapara", "Flores Secas", "La Primera Vez" and "Amores Incompletos", the latter song also credits Ángel Parra. Some of the songs were written while the band was still in Concepción, according to Francisco Molina, drummer of the band, the songs "El Haz Sensor", "En Jamaica", "Pájaros de Fuego" and "Flores Secas" were the first songs from the album to be written, saying "I remember some drafts of those songs while in Conce, we would play them a lot, there was also some idea of "Un Amor Violento" going around during that time".

The album starts with "Somos Tontos No Pesados" ("We Are Stupid Not Annoying"), which according to Henríquez was "a way to say who we were, a little warholian, but a way nonetheless". The song is followed by "El Haz Sensor" ("The Sensor Beam"), the name of the song is word play of the words "El Ascensor" ("The Elevator"), which in Spanish sounds like the title of the song. The next song is "Sudapara", a rockabilly song whose name is the words "Suda" ("Sweat") and "Para" ("For") written together, the name appears in the chorus and the ending of the song in lines such as "Suda para mí una vez más, cariño" ("Sweat for me once more, honey"), American rockabilly band Stray Cats served as inspiration for the sound of the song after Henríquez showed music from the band to Molina, sparking interest in them towards the genre.

The effects of the military dictatorship of Chile, which lasted until 1990, a year prior to the release of the album, appear specially towards the middle of the project, the song "Flores Secas" ("Dry Flowers") ends repeating the line "martes de terror" ("tuesday of terror"), making a reference to the 1973 Chilean coup d'état, which happened on a tuesday and started the period of dictatorship, the song "Pájaros de Fuego" ("Fire Birds") is a jazz infused song that is inspired in the Hawker Hunter, a type of aircraft that was used during the coup, and "La Primera Vez" ("The First Time"), is said to be a protest song written about Augusto Pinochet, the leador of the military regime, containing lyrics like "Nauseabundo de traiciones, vomitaste en sus caras, y no pensaste que tal vez volverían por tí, esas calles se nublaron, se perdieron en la sombra, del remordimiento que ahora te hace caer" ("Nauseous by betrayals, you threw up on their faces, and you thought that maybe they would come for you, those streets are cloudy, got lost in the shadow, from the remorse that now makes you fall") that could be directed to him, "La Primera Vez" also appears in the band's 1995 live album MTV Unplugged, where Henríquez recognized that the song was directed towards the people that get to power in morally reprehensible ways. The three songs, one after the other, dwell on themes of despair, sadness and anger, themes that were present in Chilean society during the time, following the 1988 Chilean national plebiscite that brought an end to the dictatorship.

"En Jamaica" is a more reggae sounding song, inspired by British band The Police, initially the band was not clear about including the song, specially because of its lyrics, but they decided otherwise after noticing the positive reception of the song from young audiences. The themes of love and relationships are explored in the following two songs of the album, "Un Amor Violento" ("A Violent Love") is a rock bolero about an idealized version of love while "Amores Incompletos" ("Incomplete Loves") takes a different approach exploring the unfulfilled fantasies of love that people create. The album ends with "He Barrido el Sol" ("I Have Swept the Sun"), a polka inspired song that also references Pinochet's regime, it is said that the lines "No es tan fácil, ser feliz, cuando opacaste el barniz que pintaste verde, azul y gris" ("It is not easy to be happy when you covered the varnish that you painted green, blue and grey"), refer to the colors of the different branches of the army in Chile and its involvement in the regime and coup.

According to Lindl, the process of recording and composing the album was different and difficult, saying that "it was a challenge to play two different electric guitars, a double bass and a set of drums, no one recorded with double bass at that time, everybody was doing it with an electric bass, I think that was what stood out the most, that contrast between the old sound and the modern, rock & roll, rockabilly, a mixture of influences that we were receiving at that point".

== Track listing ==
All tracks were produced by Carlos Necochea.

Los Tres
No.	Title	Writer(s)	Length
1.	"Somos Tontos, No Pesados" (We Are Stupid, Not Annoying)	Álvaro Henríquez	4:19
2.	"El Haz Sensor" (The Sensor Beam)	Henríquez	2:27
3.	"Sudapara"	Henríquez; Roberto Lindl	2:54
4.	"Flores Secas" (Dried Flowers)	Henríquez; Lindl	5:25
5.	"Pájaros de Fuego" (Fire Birds)	Henríquez	4:30
6.	"La Primera Vez" (The First Time)	Henríquez; Lindl	3:40
7.	"En Jamaica" (In Jamaica)	Henríquez	3:15
8.	"Un Amor Violento" (A Violent Love)	Henríquez	4:32
9.	"Amores Incompletos" (Incomplete Loves)	Henríquez; Ángel Parra; Lindl	5:44
10.	"He Barrido el Sol" (I Have Swept the Sun)	Henríquez	3:44
Total length:			40:34

== Critical reception and legacy ==
Alfredo Lewin from the Chilean radio station Sonar FM considered the album influential in Chilean rock music by starting the career of the band and helping with the expansion of the genre in the country during the nineties, he wrote that "Chilean rock music needed an identity and the band that encapsulates the nineties identity, is a band coming from Concepción, composed by three penquistas and a santiaguino: Los Tres". Rodrigo Pincheira, author of the book Somos tontos, no pesados: cosas que pasaron en Conce y otros amores incompletos, called the album a "postmodern album", highlighting the eclectic nature of both the album and the band's career, commenting that "what this self-titled album has is a musical approach that speaks very well with the musical past of Chile, a place where I think many processes are quite postmodern, I mean, being a rock band that does bolero as well as other music like rockabilly, rock & roll, jazz, and even hinting at what they would do next, specifically towards Chilean music, like tonada and cueca, was something interesting that was not being done at the time".

About the legacy and impact of the album, "Titae" Lindl said that "we were super focused on making something well rehearsed, very well executed, that was coherent and had musicality, we focused a lot in this album and that is why it turned out like that and has that collection of songs, it was very important for Chilean music and for our audience that still treasures the album, it is one of the big albums of Chilean music".

The album was included in the list of 250 Most Important Albums of Iberoamerican Rock, released in 2006 by American magazine Al Borde, in the position 151, being one of the three albums by the band to appear in the list, alongside MTV Unplugged (1995) and La Espada & la Pared (1995), that appear on the positions 210 and 61, respectively. It was also included in the list of 50 Best Chilean Albums at number 20, released by the Chilean edition of the American magazine Rolling Stone in 2008, the list was voted by several Chilean musicians and music critics.

=== All-time lists ===
Publication	Country	List	Year	Rank	Ref.
Al Borde	United States	250 Most Important Albums of Iberoamerican Rock	2006	151	
Rolling Stone	Chile	50 Best Chilean Albums	2008	20	

== Personnel ==
=== Los Tres ===
- Álvaro Henríquez – vocals, guitar, organ
- Ángel Parra – guitar, backing vocals
- Roberto Lindl – bass, double bass, backing vocals
- Francisco Molina – drums

=== Technical personnel ===
- Carlos Necochea – producer
- Jorge Esteban – engineer
- Claudio Espinoza – assistant engineer
- Julio Saravia – assistant engineer
- Jorge Esteban – mixing
- Francisco León – recording supervisor
