= Ángel Parra Jr. =

Chilean musician and producer (born 1966)

Ángel Parra
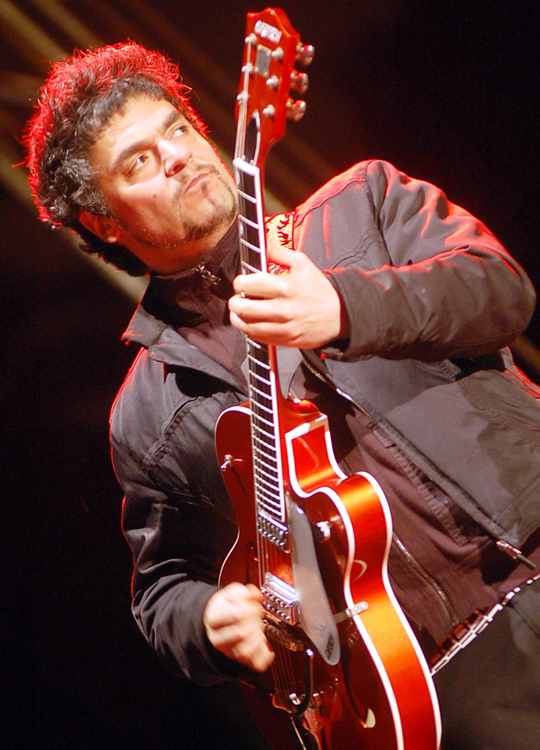
- Parra performing live in 2010.

Background information
- Born: Ángel Cereceda Orrego; 22 May 1966 (age 60); Santiago, Chile
- Occupations: Guitarist; producer
- Instruments: Electric guitar; folk guitar
- Member of: Los Tres

Ángel Cereceda Orrego, also known as Ángel Parra Orrego or just Ángel Parra Jr. (May 22, 1966), is a Chilean musician and producer. A prominent guitarist, member of the rock band Los Tres for 25 years, and leader of his jazz group Ángel Parra Trío active since 1989. He is recognized as one of the best Chilean guitarists because he fluently handles languages such as jazz, rock, and folklore. He is the son of Chilean singer-songwriter Ángel Parra and Marta Orrego Matte, and grandson of Violeta Parra, being a member of the Parra family, one of the most prolific musical clans in Chile.

== Career ==
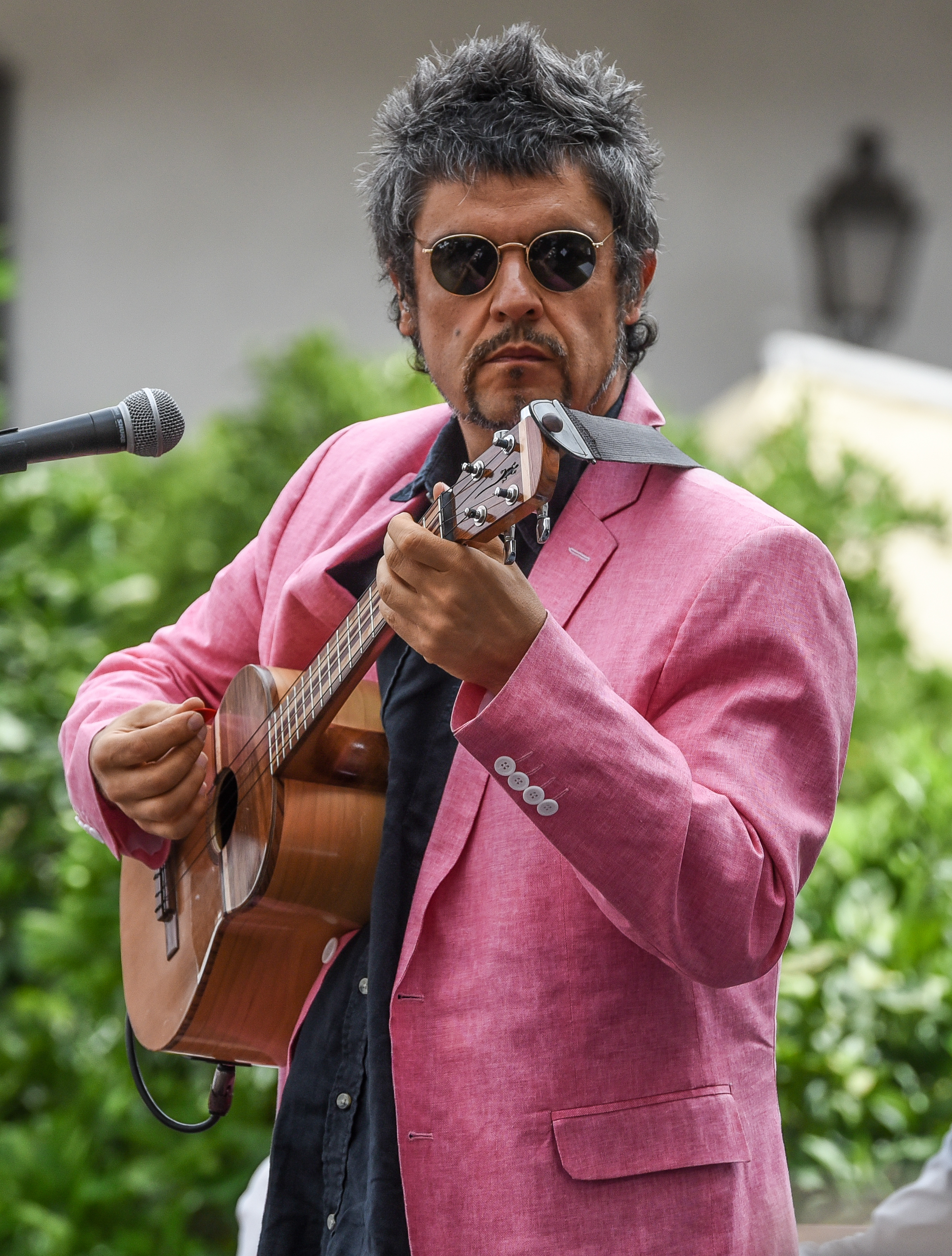
Ángel Parra playing at the Palacio de La Moneda in 2017

Ángel Parra Jr.'s inclination for music stems from his father's interest in him quickly learning the art of the guitar, even at the time of exile in Mexico. Together with his sister Javiera Parra, he has his first forays into informal music in a duo called Silhouette. However, it is not until his return to Chile in the late 1980s that he has his first professional job as a musician, in the jazz-rock group called Cometa, with which he gets to edit a homonymous album in 1987.

His friendship with Álvaro Henríquez led him to be the only person from Santiago to join the Concepción band called Los Tres, which he joined as lead guitarist in 1988. Within the group, he unleashed his influences, incorporating jazz riffs and arrangements of the band's repertoire, which belonged almost exclusively, in compositional terms, to Henríquez.

In December 2013, due to personal projects in Chile, Ángel Parra publicly announced his resignation from the band, after a 25-year career with them, 12 albums, and a huge recognition through Latin America.

However, Ángel's maximum development as a musician would not come until he established the leadership of a separate collective, Ángel Parra Trío, along with his closest associate, Los Tres' bassist Roberto "Titae" Lindl. With this project Parra edits a series of albums in which he not only develops his skills as a composer and virtuoso guitar player, but also establishes a framework for the interpretation of various styles, from the purest jazz to Latin American fusion. Thus he has managed to establish himself as one of the best known guitarists in the country, a celebrity within the Chilean music scene.

In 2011 he formed a jazz sextet called Ángel Parra y Los Fugitivos. Since 2013 he has worked as a guitarist and producer for the singer-songwriter Manuel García.

In 2017, in the middle of the centenary year of his grandmother, Ángel Parra re-observed the farewell work of her, with a recording of the entire repertoire of songs published in 1966, here with the name of Las últimas composiciones de Violeta Parra. Taking up the only solo work of his made in 1995 also in honor of his grandmother. He recorded with Javiera Parra ("Gracias a la vida", "El Albertío", "Maldigo del alto cielo"), Manuel García ("Singers who reflect"), Álex Anwandter ("Mazúrquica modérnica", "Rin del angelito"), the former Los Bunkers Álvaro López ("Run Run se fué pa'l norte"), and his father Ángel Parra, in which he was the last recording before he died in late 2017 ("La cueca de los poetas", "De cuerpo entero").

== Discography ==
=== Solo ===
- 1995 - Composiciones para guitarra de Violeta Parra
- 2017 - Las últimas composiciones de Violeta Parra
- 2019 - Travesuras
- 2023 - Soundtracks

=== With Los Tres ===
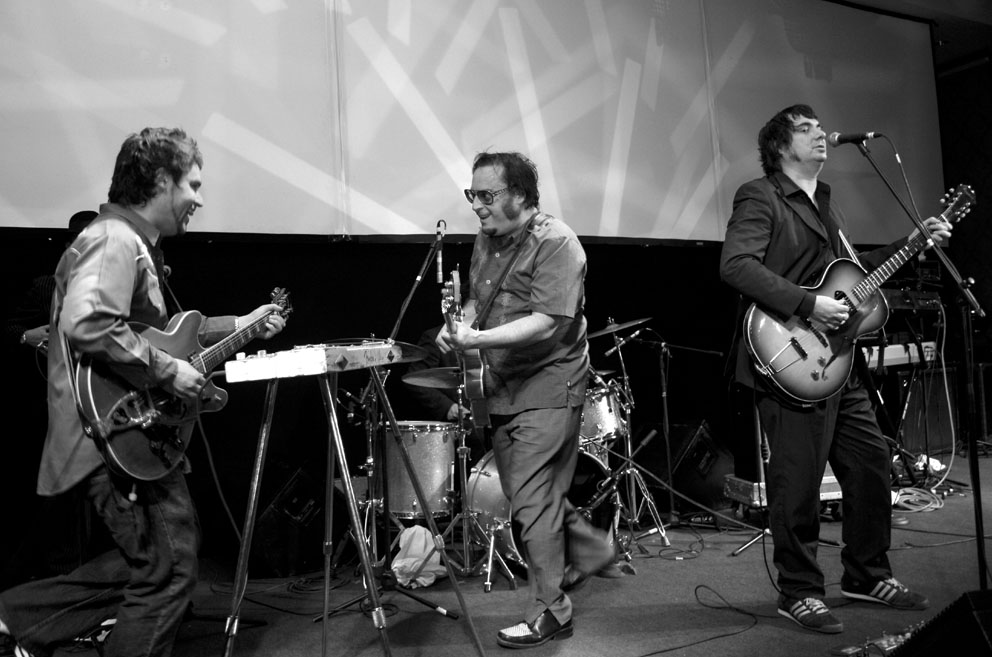
With Los Tres

- 1991 - Los Tres
- 1993 - Se remata el siglo
- 1995 - La Espada & la Pared
- 1995 - Los Tres MTV Unplugged
- 1996 - La Yein Fonda
- 1997 - Fome
- 1998 - Peineta
- 1999 - La sangre en el cuerpo
- 2006 - Hágalo Usted Mismo
- 2007 - Arena
- 2009 - 33 Horas Bar
- 2010 - Coliumo

=== With Ángel Parra Trío ===
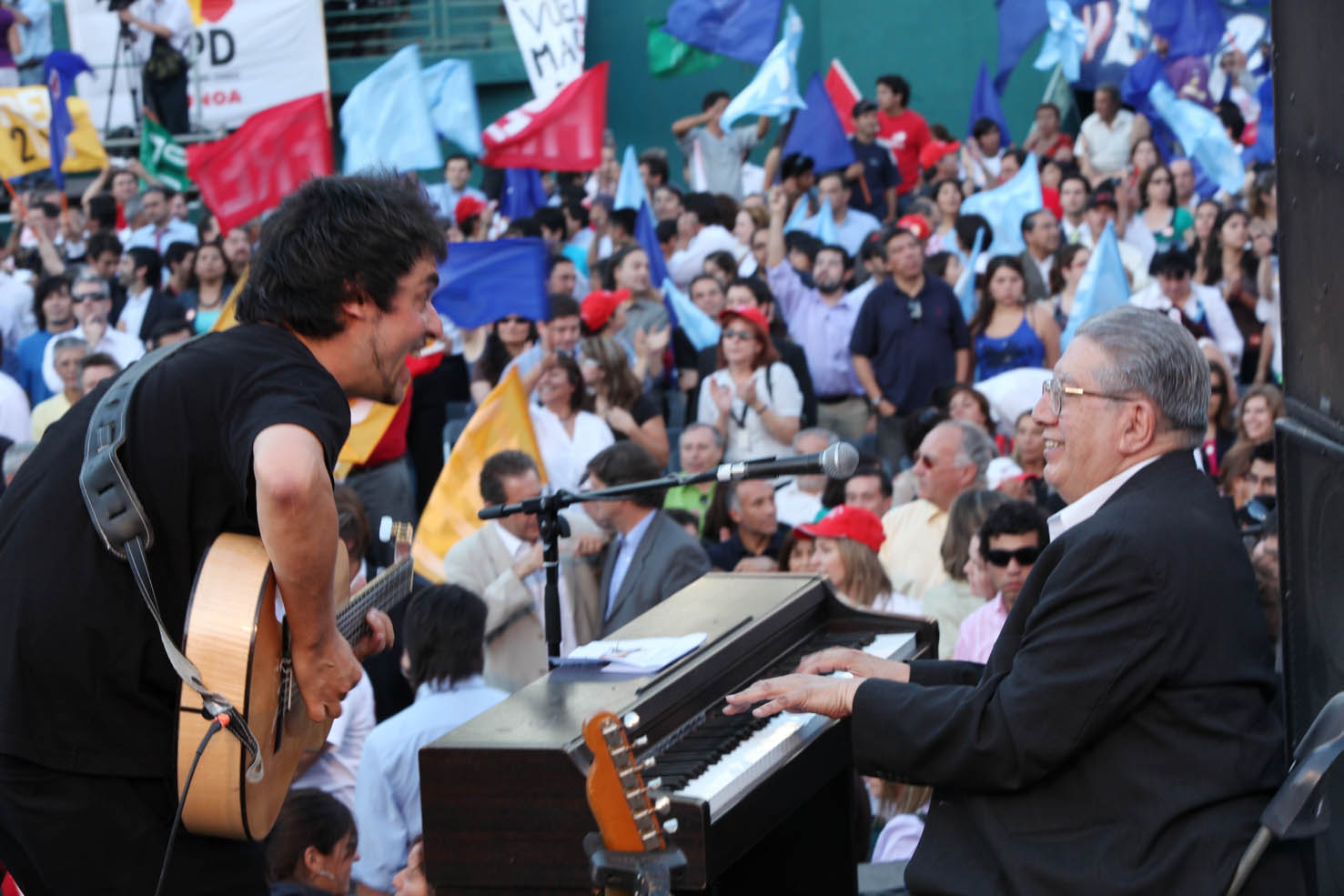
With Valentín Trujillo as guest in Ángel Parra Trío

- 1992 - Ángel Parra Trío
- 1995 - Patana
- 1996 - Piscola Standards
- 1998 - Tequila!!!
- 2000 - No junta ni pega
- 2002 - La hora feliz
- 2003 - Vamos que se puede
- 2005 - Playa solitaria
- 2008 - Un año más
- 2009 - Espérame (with Valentín Trujillo)
- 2016 - Dulce compañía

=== With Cometa ===
- 1987 - Cometa

=== Collectives ===
- 2009 - Roberto Parra: Invocado

=== Collaborations ===
- 1989 - Ángel Parra en Chile (de Ángel Parra)
- 1993 - Todo el amor (de Ángel Parra)
- 1994 - Boleros (de Ángel Parra)
- 1994 - Los náufragos (de Ángel Parra y Miguel Littín)
- 1998 - El insolente (de Ángel Parra)
- 2000 - Brindis y cuecas caballas (de Ángel Parra)
- 2014 - Retrato iluminado (de Manuel García)
