= Colombina Parra =

Chilean musician and singer (born 1970)

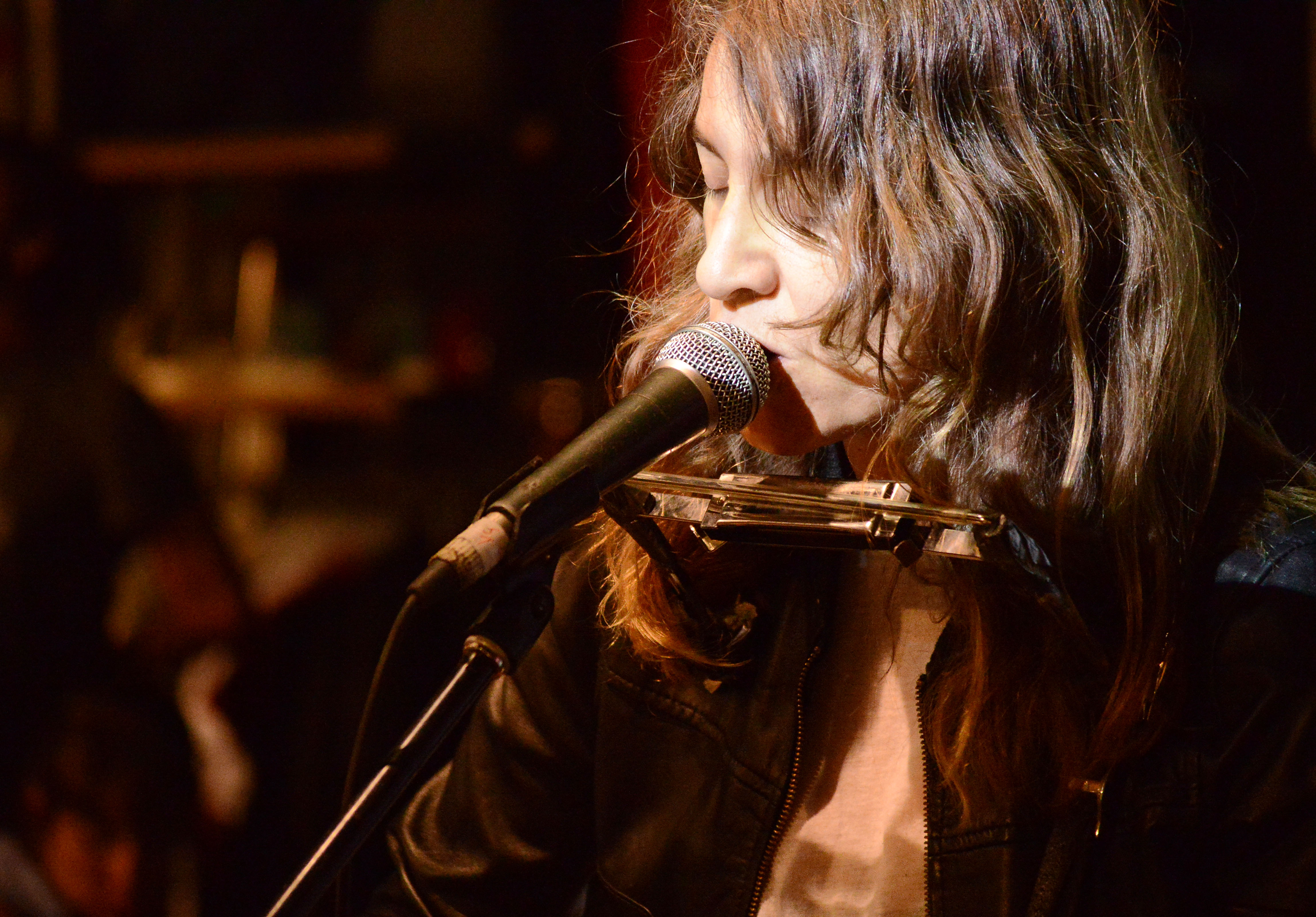
- Colombina Parra at 2013

Background information
- Born: 1970 (age 54–55)
- Genres: Grunge, Alternative rock
- Occupation: vocals
- Years active: 1990s

Colombina Violeta Parra Tuca (born 1970) is a Chilean musician and singer. She was part of the Chilean grunge/alternative rock scene in the 1990s. Her band, Ex, were well known in Latin America when their first album came out with singles like "Sacar la Basura", "La Corbata de mi Tío" and "Vendo Diario" in 1996.

Parra is the daughter of the physicist, mathematician and self-titled "anti-poet" Nicanor Parra and the niece of famed folk singer Violeta Parra.

== See also ==
- Parra family
