= Sol y Lluvia =

Chilean band

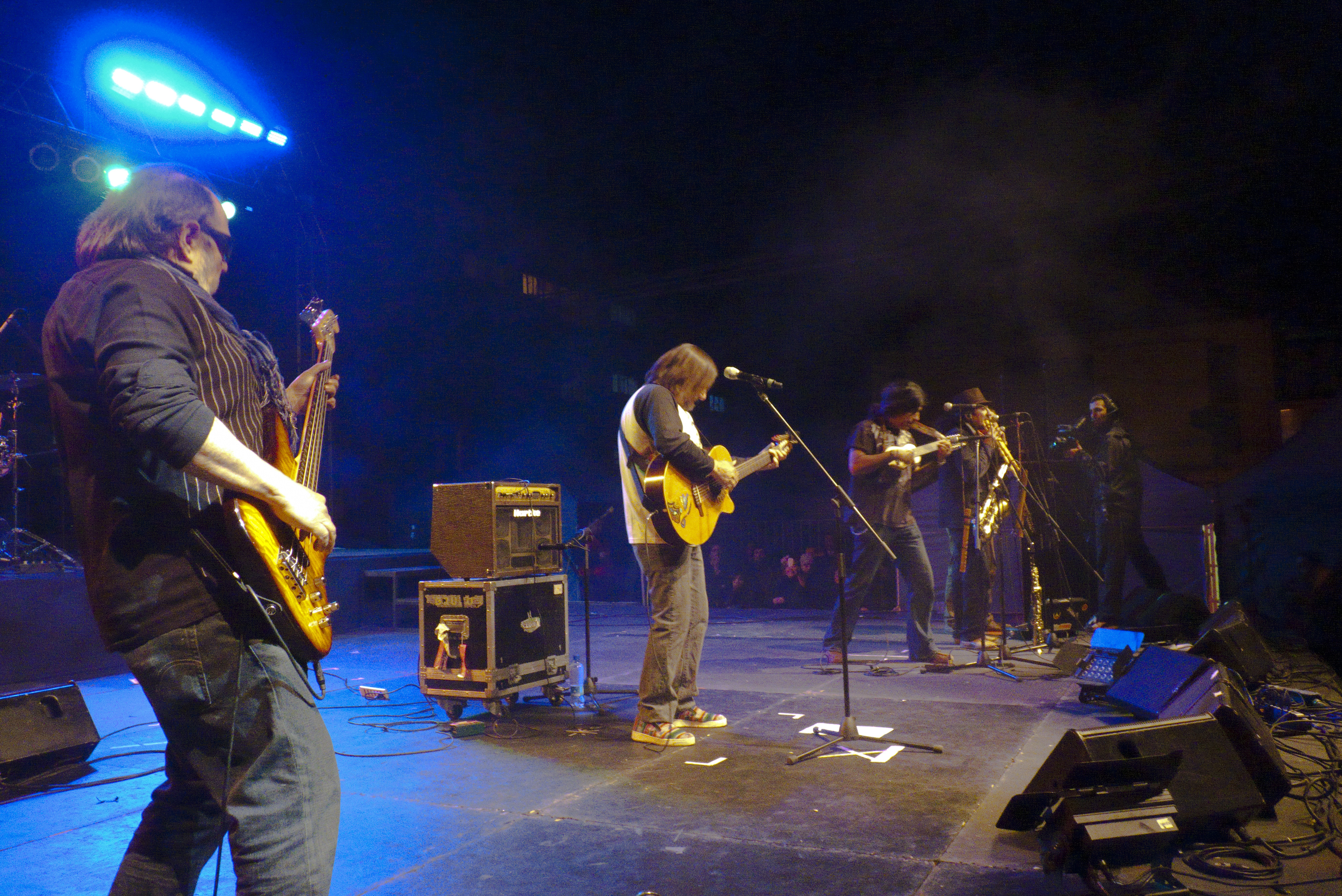
Sol y Lluvia during a concert in May 2012

Sol y Lluvia is a Chilean musical group founded in 1978 by the Labra brothers.

Their music is based on an acoustic guitar and percussion from the bombo and kultrunes to develop simple and danceable songs. Their straightforward lyrics reference peace, repression, social inequalities, and opposition to the military dictatorship led by Augusto Pinochet. The group has generally remained apart from the media and the record industry.

== History ==
The members of the band did not originally come together because of the music. The Labra brothers established a screen printing workshop in 1975 in the San Joaquín commune, with support from industrial promotion plans developed by the Catholic Church at that time. In that space, where around twenty people worked, Charles and Amaro Labra began to make music during breaks, inspired by what they called "the revolution of hope." This principle has underpinned the entire history of the group, which formed as such when the two brothers began performing at unions and universities.

Initially baptized as Antu Auka (in mapudungun, meaning "Rebel Sun"), the duo's compositions were politically themed. Their music was influenced by the Nueva Canción Chilena movement and the repression that Chile was experiencing with the military's recent rise to power. Amaro Labra had been a student leader while studying Business Administration at the Universidad de Chile, and he took on the role of the group's vocalist and the composer of their early songs.

In 1978, the band was renamed Sol y Lluvia and gradually began to increase the frequency of its performances, especially in venues associated with opposition to the regime, such as peñas, community centers, and university events. This choice led them to face military repression multiple times. On September 11, 1978, the two brothers were caught by security agents distributing flyers on the street, leading to their initial detention and subsequent surveillance by intelligence agencies.

Two years later, the group produced their first cassette, Canto + vida (1980), in a handmade fashion, which they sold personally at their performances, along with posters and cards they made in the screen printing workshop. Their approach to the Canto Nuevo movement allowed them, in 1982, to star in a week of concerts at the Café del Cerro, during which they recorded their second production: Canto es vida.

It was at this moment that Sol y Lluvia consolidated its path as a professional option. The group already had several original songs, Charles Labra had enriched the percussion with new kultrunes and bombos, now integrating cymbals, toms, snare, and timbales, creating what became known as "Andean percussion." In 1983, Jonny Labra, the younger brother of the duo, joined permanently as the group's bassist. With a unique power trio structure, the band began a second stage in its history, marked by the release of records and promotional tours. The anti-dictatorship resistance continued to be an important part of their musical work.

== Successes and achievements ==
Songs such as "Adiós general" (a free version of the song "Adiós juventud" by Uruguayan Jaime Roos), "Un largo tour," "Para que nunca más," and "Armas, vuélvanse a casa," among others, became references in the circuits opposing the dictatorship. The trio's presence became common at community, university, and human rights events, distinguished by the simplicity and direct, straightforward nature of their proposals. Influences from Uruguayan murga, nortino rhythms, and classic rock clearly set Sol y Lluvia apart from the musicians with whom they shared the stage, who were almost exclusively troubadours or academically trained musicians. All of this supported their growing popularity.

Lyrics referencing peace, poverty, family, and God earned them associations with the Christian Democratic Party on more than one occasion. The members of Sol y Lluvia did not engage in political militancy until the late 1990s, when Amaro Labra directly connected with the Communist Party. During the dictatorship, the musicians adhered more to the logic of the opposition seeking to confront the military peacefully. "We had Christian roots, but nothing more than that," Amaro Labra explains today.

In this context, and always on the fringes of the music industry, they released their first studio production as a trio: A desatar esperanzas in 1987 (reissued on CD by the Alerce label in 1997). This album included several of their classic songs, some of which had already been recorded in earlier cassettes. This effort continued the following year with + Personas, completing two productions distributed by the EMI label. More than 40,000 copies of these recordings were sold, even though the audience made home copies that circulated from hand to hand, in an underground distribution that the group itself encouraged.

In 1988, Sol y Lluvia actively joined the campaign for the NO in the plebiscite of October. Even on October 6, a day after the dictatorship recognized its defeat, the main headline of the newspaper Fortín Mapocho was: "Adiós General, adiós carnaval," with the caption "Author: The People of Chile. Performer: Sol y Lluvia."

Although at that moment the group was on a tour in Canada, playing before the circuits of the Chilean exile community, this recognition is now a milestone in their history and a testament to how deeply rooted their songs were in the national political context. Based on this, Sol y Lluvia recorded a new live album the following year (at a concert at the Teatro California), titled El aire volverá (1989). This release inaugurated a series of three live albums that the group launched in the following years: Adiós General, adiós carnaval (1990) was recorded on the last day of the military dictatorship of Pinochet at the Estadio Santa Laura before 25,000 people. Somos gente de la tierra (1992) was the recording of a concert in the central court of the Estadio Nacional, which included several original songs.

For this period, Sol y Lluvia had already added a charanguista to their lineup. Initially, it was Juan Flores (who would later join Illapu in 1990 and is currently a member of the well-known national group Inti-Illimani), followed by Patricio Quilodrán, in addition to the quenista Marcelo Concha. With this new lineup and a more Andean sound, the group returned to the recording studio to register the album Hacia la tierra (1993), which also incorporated an electronic drum. A cover showing all their members naked (which was later changed) generated some public uproar that, however, did not impact the album's reception, which received a clearly lesser response than their previous works.

By the mid-1990s, Sol y Lluvia's activity experienced a noticeable decline when Amaro Labra joined the Alerce label as an executive, and although from there he reissued certain segments of the band's discography, by the end of the decade, the group had regained its place of popularity. In April 1999, Sol y Lluvia became the first Chilean group to fill the central coliseum of the Estadio Nacional, in a concert that drew nearly 60,000 people.

== New times ==
During this same period, the San Joaquín group experienced the most significant crisis in its history. Charles Labra, co-founder of the band, publicly clashed with his brothers, and in 2000 he resigned to create a new group: Antu Kai Mawen (Sol y Lluvia in mapudungun). From there, with new musicians, he began performing the band's repertoire, primarily on the street and in buses. Charles Labra thus began a parallel story that already includes his own albums and keeps him active in music, albeit on a rather marginal path compared to that of his brothers.

Sol y Lluvia continued on its own path—with Harley Labra, Amaro's son, on percussion—releasing La vida siempre (2000), a new album whose launch attracted five thousand people to the Teatro Monumental. As a quintet, with an invited percussionist and guitarist, the group has reinterpreted its old songs and has performed regularly both inside and outside of Chile. They have shared the stage with Los Jaivas, Illapu, Gondwana, and Inti-Illimani, among many others, and have undertaken two tours in Europe, releasing for the first time a new album under a multinational label.

La conspiración de la esperanza (2004) is that production, which includes a song by Cuban Silvio Rodríguez and a promotional video for the single "Wanted," consolidating the group's septet formation. Although it did not receive wide media exposure, this did not affect the activity of a band accustomed to operating outside those circuits. A year later, the group released its first DVD, recorded at a concert alongside Inti-Illimani Histórico: another step for this band, which is now recognized as a veteran in its genre, with a clear political message and strong support from the public, especially in the popular sectors of Chilean society.

On June 14, 2013, they released their studio album Clima humana at the Teatro Caupolicán in Santiago.

== Members ==
- Amaro Labra, voice and guitar
- Marcelo Concha, quena, zampoña, sax, charango, and voice
- Harley Labra, drums
- Joseph Barahona, quena, zampoña, charango, and voice
- Nicolás Rodríguez, bass
- Isadora Lobos, trombone
- Carlos Soto, trumpet
- Fabián Córdova, electric guitar

=== Past members ===
- Charles Labra, Andean percussion and voice (from 1976 to 2000)
- Patricio Quilodrán, quena, zampoña, charango, and voice (from 1989 to 2012)
- Jonny Labra, bass (from 1985 to 2013)
- Juan Flores, charango and Andean winds
- Jaime Vásquez, sax
- Pedro Villagra, sax
- Rodrigo Santibáñez, quena, zampoña, and voice (from 2013 to 2014)
- Juan Contreras, trombone (from 2008 to 2015)
- Mauricio Rojas, bass (from 2013 to 2015)

== Discography ==
=== Studio albums ===
- 1980: Canto + Vida (Self-released)
- 1987: A desatar esperanzas (Independent release)
- 1988: + personas (Independent release)
- 1989: Testimonio de paz (Alerce)
- 1993: Hacia la tierra (Alerce)
- 2000: La vida siempre (Alerce)
- 2004: La conspiración de la esperanza (Universal)
- 2013: Clima humana (Mastér Media)

=== Live albums ===
- 1982: Canto es vida (Self-released)
- 1989: El aire volverá (Independent release)
- 1990: Adiós General, adiós carnaval (Independent release)
- 1992: Somos gente de la tierra (Alerce)
- 2005: Sol y Lluvia vive!!! (Self-released)
- 2012: Sol y Lluvia 30 Años en Vivo!!! (Mastér Media)

=== Compilation albums ===
- 1989: 19. Festival des politischen Liedes (Amiga)
- 1993: El sonido de los suburbios (Alerce)
- 1994: Antología del Canto Nuevo (Alerce)
- 1995: Canto Nuevo, antología volumen 2 (Alerce)
- 1998: Tributo a Víctor Jara (Alerce)
- 2006: Mil voces Gladys (Dicap)

=== DVDs ===
- 2005: Sol y Lluvia vive!!! (Self-released; recorded live on May 6 and 7, 2005, Estadio Víctor Jara, Chile)
- 2005: Allende: El sueño existe. DVD (Alerce; special participation with the song «Un largo tour»)
- 2013: Canto para no Olvidar (FeriaMix; participation with the songs «Adiós General», «Un largo tour», and «La certeza»)
