= La Espada & la Pared =

Studio album by Los Tres
- Released: 17 March 1995
- Recorded: Spring 1994
- Studio: Soundesigner, Argentina
- Genre: Chilean rock; rockabilly; pop rock; blues rock
- Length: 50:46
- Label: Sony Music Chile
- Producer: Mario Breuer; Los Tres

Los Tres chronology
Se Remata el Siglo (1993)	La Espada & la Pared (1995)	Unplugged (1995)

Singles from La Espada & la Pared
- 1. "Déjate Caer" Released: 1995; 2. "La Espada y la Pared" Released: 1995; 3. "Hojas de Té" Released: 1995; 4. "Tírate" Released: 1996

La Espada & la Pared (Spanish: [la esˈpaða i la paˈɾed], lit. 'The Sword and the Wall') is the third studio album by Chilean rock band Los Tres, released on 17 March 1995, through Sony Music Chile. The album is composed by thirteen songs, including two covers (Buddy Richard's "Tu Cariño Se Me Va" and The Velvet Underground's "All Tomorrow's Parties"), and was produced by Argentine record producer Mario Breuer alongside the band. The artwork for the cover is the painting "Portrait of Nadya Repina" by Russian painter Ilya Repin.

The album is considered as influential in both the band's career as well as the Chilean rock scene and Chilean music as a whole, specially during the nineties. American magazine Al Borde placed the album at number 61 in their list of 250 Most Important Albums of Iberoamerican Rock, released in 2006, being one of the three albums by the band to appear on the list. The Chilean edition of Rolling Stone included the album in their 50 Best Chilean Album list, released in 2008, placing it at number 10.

== Background ==
The album was produced by Mario Breuer, who also worked on the band's previous album Se Remata el Siglo (1993), it was recorded at Soundesigner Studios in Buenos Aires, Argentina and mixed at New River Studio in United States. The recording of Se Remata el Siglo was marked by differences between Breuer and some members of the band, specially Henríquez, which continued during the recording of La Espada & la Pared, with Henríquez saying "I learnt how an album should not be produced" following the release of the album, despite this, Breuer considered the album "one of the best that I have produced in my life". The album spawned four singles, "Déjate Caer", "La Espada & la Pared", "Hojas de Té" and "Tírate". After its release, the album achieved both critical and commercial success, going platinum and reaching the first position on the Chilean albums chart.

== Composition ==
The album contains thirteen tracks, the first eleven being original songs and the last two being covers, these tracks range from blues rock songs like "Hojas de Té" and "Tírate", ballads such as "Me Rompió el Corazón" and "Moizefala", the rockabilly "La Espada & la Pared", the funkier "Partir de Cero" and the instrumental "V & V", among others. The eleventh track "La Espada" is a shorter version of the title track and serves as a division between the original songs and the covers, these covers were "Tu Cariño Se Me Va", a 1965 song by Chilean singer Buddy Richard, who also appears in the version from the album, and "All Tomorrow's Parties", a 1966 song by American rock band The Velvet Underground and written by Lou Reed, the band has previously participated in a play inspired by Andy Warhol where the band, while they were still a trio prior to the inclusion of Ángel Parra into the band, portrayed The Velvet Underground.

Themes of life, death and tragedy run through the album with significantly more poetic lyrics by Henríquez, "Déjate Caer" opens with the lines "Déjate caer, déjate caer, la tierra está al revés, la sangre es amarilla, déjate caer" ("Let yourself fall, let yourself fall, the ground is upside down, the blood is yellow, let yourself fall") while the chorus for "Tírate" says "Y si me dices que te vas, que no lo quieres intentar, entonces abre la ventana, y tírate" ("And if you tell me that you are leaving, and that you don't want to try, open the window then and throw yourself"), both songs making potential references to death and even suicide. The song "Moizefala", originally written for the short film Moizéfala, la desdichada directed by Germán Bobe and later included to the album, tells the story of the lead character of the short film, Moizefala (played by Moisés Ammache), a renowned transsexual during the dictatorship of Chile who was constantly reviled by her cousin Humedad and fought against her for the love of rock musician Darioleto Benítez (played by Henríquez himself).

== Critical reception ==
Professional ratings
Review scores
Source	Rating
AllMusic	4/5 stars

Tim Sheridan from AllMusic gave the album four out of five stars, calling the album "a unique effort from a band that deserves to realize the crossover dream", writing that "their Latin pop mixes in blues licks ("Hojas de Té"), rockabilly (the title track) and even a little soul ("Moizefala") for an adventurous, if somewhat over-ambitious mix".

Alfredo Lewin from Chilean radio station Sonar FM, considered the album a pivotal album for the identity of Chilean society and youth during the nineties saying that "Chile, an anxious country, by the mid nineties, searched something to hold on to and if there is a photograph of the first half of the decade was that of La Espada & la Pared, Los Tres were the first rock stars in the post-Prisioneros era to achieve international success (via MTV) without having to leave the borders of the country". Some of the songs in the album have been considered as one of the best in the band's discography, Mario Breuer, the producer of the album, said that "Déjate Caer" was "one of the most beautiful songs ever written in Spanish language" while "Moizefala" has been often called "one of the best ballads written by Henríquez".

The album was included in the list of 250 Most Important Albums of Iberoamerican Rock, released in 2006 by American magazine Al Borde, in the position 61, being one of the three albums by the band to appear in the list, alongside MTV Unplugged (1995) and Los Tres (1991), that appear on the positions 210 and 151, respectively. It was also included in the list of 50 Best Chilean Albums at number 10, released by the Chilean edition of the American magazine Rolling Stone in 2008, the list was voted by several Chilean musicians and music critics. La Espada & la Pared is the band's highest appearance in both lists.

=== All-time lists ===
Publication	Country	List	Year	Rank	Ref.
Al Borde	United States	250 Most Important Albums of Iberoamerican Rock	2006	61	
Rolling Stone	Chile	50 Best Chilean Albums	2008	10	

== Track listing ==
All tracks were produced by Mario Breuer and Los Tres.

La Espada & la Pared
No.	Title	Writer(s)	Length
1.	"Déjate Caer" (Let Yourself Fall)	Álvaro Henríquez; Roberto Lindl	3:22
2.	"Hojas de Té" (Tea Leaves)	Henríquez	3:35
3.	"La Espada & la Pared" (The Sword & the Wall)	Henríquez; Lindl	5:03
4.	"Dos en Uno" (Two in One)	Henríquez; Lindl	5:52
5.	"Tírate" (Throw Yourself)	Henríquez	3:17
6.	"Te Desheredo" (I Disinherit You)	Henríquez; Lindl	4:48
7.	"Partir de Cero" (Start from Zero)	Henríquez; Lindl	4:16
8.	"Moizefala"	Henríquez	4:36
9.	"V & V"	Henríquez	2:54
10.	"Me Rompió el Corazón" (It Broke My Heart)	Henríquez	4:31
11.	"La Espada" (The Sword)	Henríquez; Lindl	0:36
12.	"Tu Cariño Se Me Va" (Your Love is Leaving Me)	Buddy Richard	2:50
13.	"All Tomorrow's Parties"	Lou Reed	4:56
Total length:			50:46

== Credits ==
=== Los Tres ===
- Álvaro Henríquez – vocals, guitar, organ, mixing, mastering
- Ángel Parra – guitar, backing vocals, mixing
- Roberto Lindl – bass, double bass, backing vocals, mixing
- Francisco Molina – drums, mixing

=== Guest artists ===
- Antonio Restucci – mandoline (tracks 1 and 10)
- Cuti Aste – accordion (tracks 3 and 5)
- Buddy Richard – vocals (track 12)

=== Technical ===
- Guido Nisenson – engineer, mixing
- Mario Breuer – mixing, mastering
- Riley Conelli – mixing assistant
- Jorge Undurraga – executive producer
- Sergio García – executive producer
- Leo García – art direction
- Gonzalo Donoso – photography

== Charts ==
Chart (1996)	Peak position
Chile (APF)	1
