= Javiera y Los Imposibles =

Chilean pop band

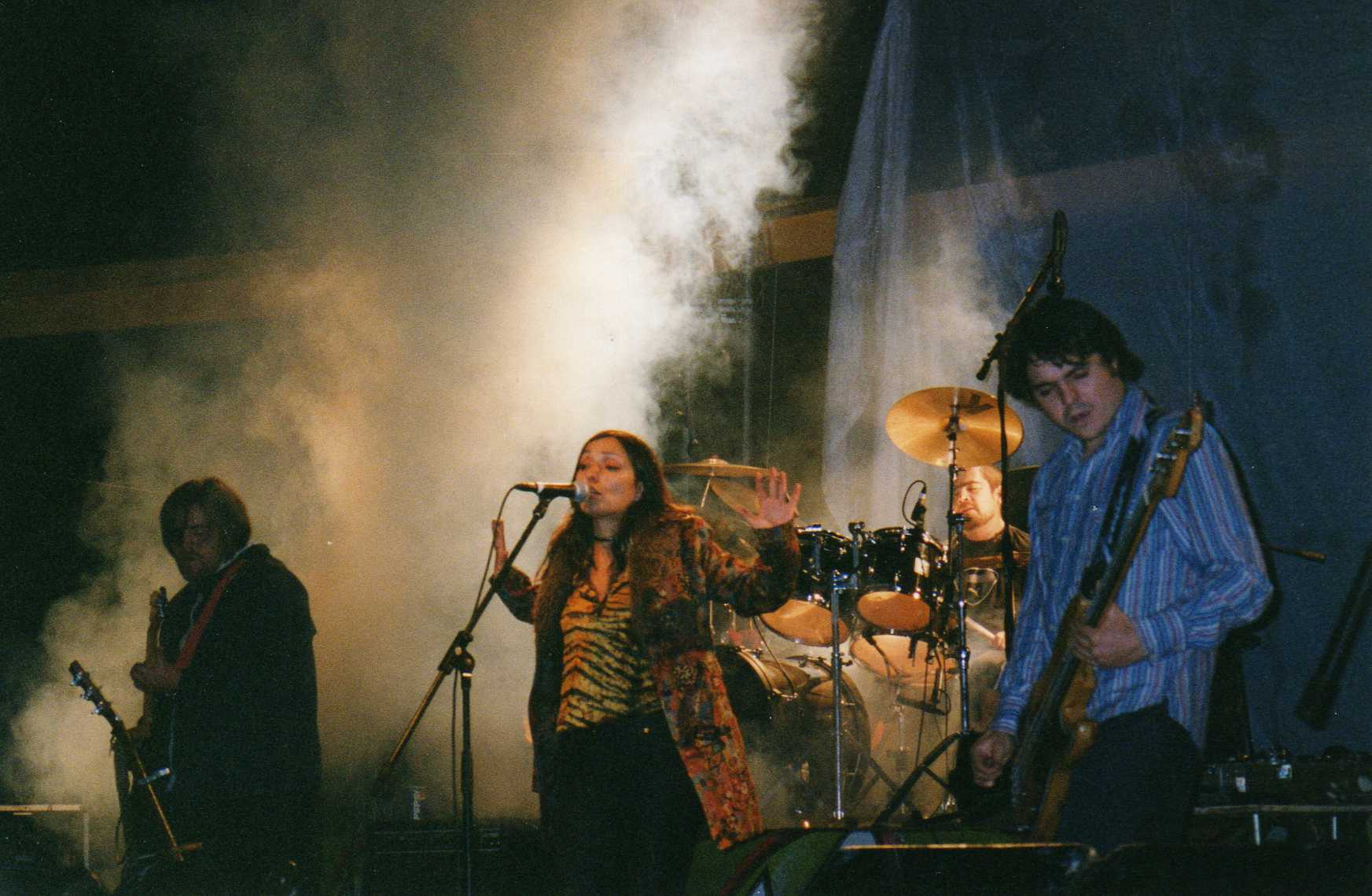
Javiera y los Imposibles

Javiera y Los Imposibles is Chilean pop band led by Javiera Parra, granddaughter of Chilean folk musician Violeta Parra. The band was formed when Álvaro Henríquez from Los Tres met Javiera and helped her to produce the first album Corte en trámite together with other musicians.

== Discography ==
=== Studio albums ===
- 1995 - Corte en trámite
- 1998 - La suerte
- 2000 - A color
- 2001 - AM
- 2003 - El poder del mar
- 2012 - El árbol de la vida
- 2019 - Gracias a Violeta
