= Javiera Parra =

Chilean musician, singer (born 1968)

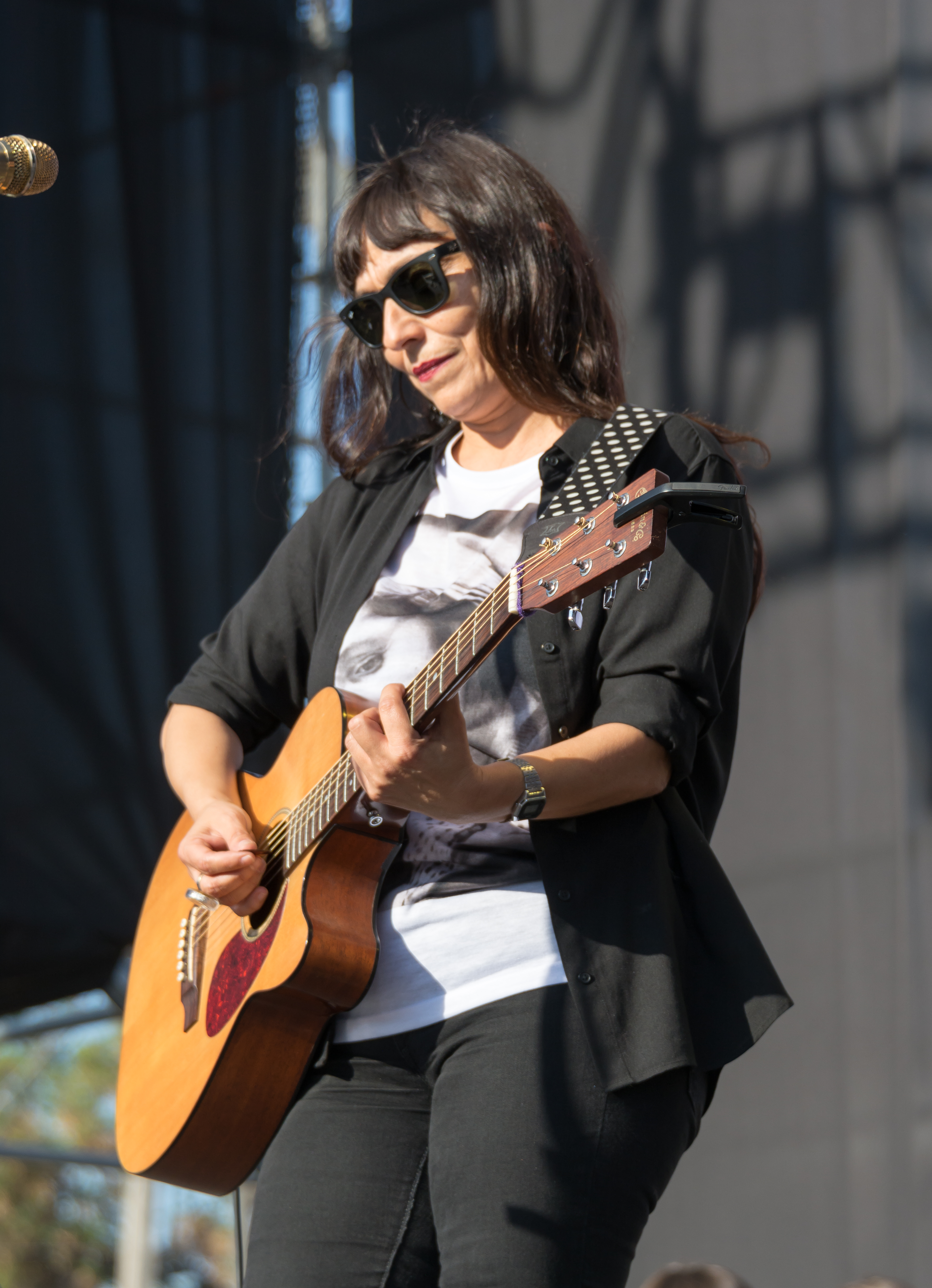
Javiera Parra in 2019.

Javiera Cereceda Orrego (born 19 May 1968), better known as Javiera Parra, is a Chilean musician and singer born in Santiago. She is the lead singer of rock band Javiera y Los Imposibles. A third generation member of Chile's Parra family, known for its many musicians, she is the granddaughter of famous Chilean folklorist Violeta Parra. Her brother Ángel Parra was a member of rock group Los Tres.

== See also ==
- Music of Chile
- List of Chileans
