= MTV Unplugged (Los Tres album) =

Los Tres MTV Unplugged

Live album by Los Tres
- Released: April 15, 1996
- Recorded: September 14, 1995
- Studios: Post Edge Studios, Miami, United States
- Genres: Chilean rock; rockabilly; folk
- Length: 62:32
- Label: Sony Music Chile
- Producer: Joe Blaney

Los Tres chronology
| La Espada & la Pared (1995) | Los Tres MTV Unplugged (1996) | La Yein Fonda (1996) |

Singles from Los Tres MTV unplugged
- 1. "Traje Desastre" Released: 1996

Los Tres MTV Unplugged is an MTV Unplugged live acoustic album by Chilean rock band Los Tres, released on April 15, 1996, through Sony Music Chile. The album was the band's first live album as well as the first MTV Unplugged album ever released by a Chilean band. It was recorded on September 14, 1995, at Post Edge Studios, Miami, United States and features appearances from musicians Cuti Aste and Toño Restucci. The album contains eleven songs from their previous studio albums alongside the original song "Traje Desastre" and three cover versions of songs by Chilean musician Roberto Parra. It is the band's most commercially successful album, going platinum and selling 150,000 copies within its first three months.

American magazine Al Borde placed the album at number 210 in their list of 250 Most Important Albums of Iberoamerican Rock, released in 2006, being one of the three albums by the band to appear on the list.

== Background ==
Following the international success of their third studio album La Espada & la Pared (1995), the band gave several performances in United States as a "showcase" to the executives of Sony Music in the country, this culminated in the recording of the live album on September 14, 1995, the project was managed by Alfredo Lewin and Alex Pels, both from MTV Latin America, about the process of including the band into the MTV Unplugged series Lewin said that "after La Espada & la Pared, Los Tres were a priority for Sony, they had reached the ceiling in the Chilean market and MTV had demonstrated that the thing as pan-regional by 1995", the album was produced by Joe Blaney, who had worked with artists such as The Clash and The Ramones as well as in Hello! MTV Unplugged, the live album from the series by Charly García.

The album is composed by fifteen tracks, eleven of them are songs from their previous studio albums (five from Los Tres, one from Se Remata el Siglo and five from La Espada & la Pared), the unreleased song "Traje Desastre" and three cover versions of songs by Chilean musician Roberto Parra, the two cuecas "El Arrepentido" and "La Vida Que Yo He Pasado" and the foxtrot "Quién es la Que Viene Allí", these three covers are the three last songs in the album and were chosen as a hommage to Parra, a friend of Álvaro Henríquez, the leader of the band, and fellow musician who died months prior to the recording of the album, in April 1995.

The song "Traje Desastre", the only single of the album, tells the story of a transgender woman who hides her identity. The music video of the song also reflects the themes of the song, telling the story of a transgender woman who presents as a man during the day and works as a sex worker during the night. The name of the song is a wordplay, with "Traje Desaste" meaning "I brought disaster" and Traje de Sastre meaning "Tailor's Suit".

== Critical reception ==
The album was included in the list of 250 Most Important Albums of Iberoamerican Rock, released in 2006 by American magazine Al Borde, in the position 151, being one of the three albums by the band to appear in the list, alongside Los Tres (1991) and La Espada & la Pared (1995), that appear on the positions 151 and 61, respectively.

=== All-time lists ===
| Publication | Country | List | Year | Rank | Ref. |
|---|---|---|---|---|---|
| Al Borde | United States | 250 Most Important Albums of Iberoamerican Rock | 2006 | 201 | |

== Track listing ==
Los Tres MTV Unplugged track listing
| No. | Title | Writer(s) | Original release | Length |
|---|---|---|---|---|
| 1. | "Sudapara" | Álvaro Henríquez; Roberto Lindl | Los Tres | 3:17 |
| 2. | "La Espada & la Pared" | Henríquez; Lindl | La Espada & la Pared | 5:43 |
| 3. | "Un Amor Violento" | Henríquez | Los Tres | 4:42 |
| 4. | "Gato por Liebre" | Henríquez; Lindl; Ángel Parra | Se Remata el Siglo | 4:30 |
| 5. | "Pájaros de Fuego" | Henríquez | Los Tres | 5:15 |
| 6. | "Me Rompió el Corazón" | Henríquez | La Espada & la Pared | 4:09 |
| 7. | "Déjate Caer" | Henríquez; Lindl | La Espada & la Pared | 3:28 |
| 8. | "Traje Desastre" | Henríquez; Lindl; Parra | | 3:49 |
| 9. | "Tírate" | Henríquez | La Espada & la Pared | 3:25 |
| 10. | "Te Desheredo" | Henríquez; Lindl | La Espada & la Pared | 5:10 |
| 11. | "He Barrido El Sol" | Henríquez | Los Tres | 4:38 |
| 12. | "La Primera Vez" | Henríquez; Lindl | Los Tres | 4:24 |
| 13. | "El Arrepentido" | Roberto Parra Sandoval | | 2:33 |
| 14. | "La Vida Que Yo He Pasado" | Parra Sandoval | | 3:20 |
| 15. | "Quién es la Que Viene Allí" | Parra Sandoval | | 4:08 |
| Total length: | | | | 62:32 |

== Credits ==
=== Los Tres ===
- Álvaro Henríquez – vocals, guitar, organ, mixing, mastering
- Ángel Parra – guitar, backing vocals, mixing
- Roberto Lindl – bass, double bass, backing vocals, mixing
- Francisco Molina – drums, mixing

=== Guest artists ===
- Cuti Aste – citar (tracks 5 and 10); accordion (tracks 2, 6, 9, 11, 12 and 14)
- Toño Restucci – mandolin (tracks 6, 7 and 12)

=== Personnel ===
- Manolo Álvarez – photography
- Lauren Radak – photography
- Paula Golbin – MTV Unplugged producer
- Alejandro Pels – MTV Unplugged executive producer
- Joe Blaney – mixing
- Antoinette Zel – MTV CEO
- Adam Nathanson – coordination
- Bruno del Granado – management
