= Isabel Parra =

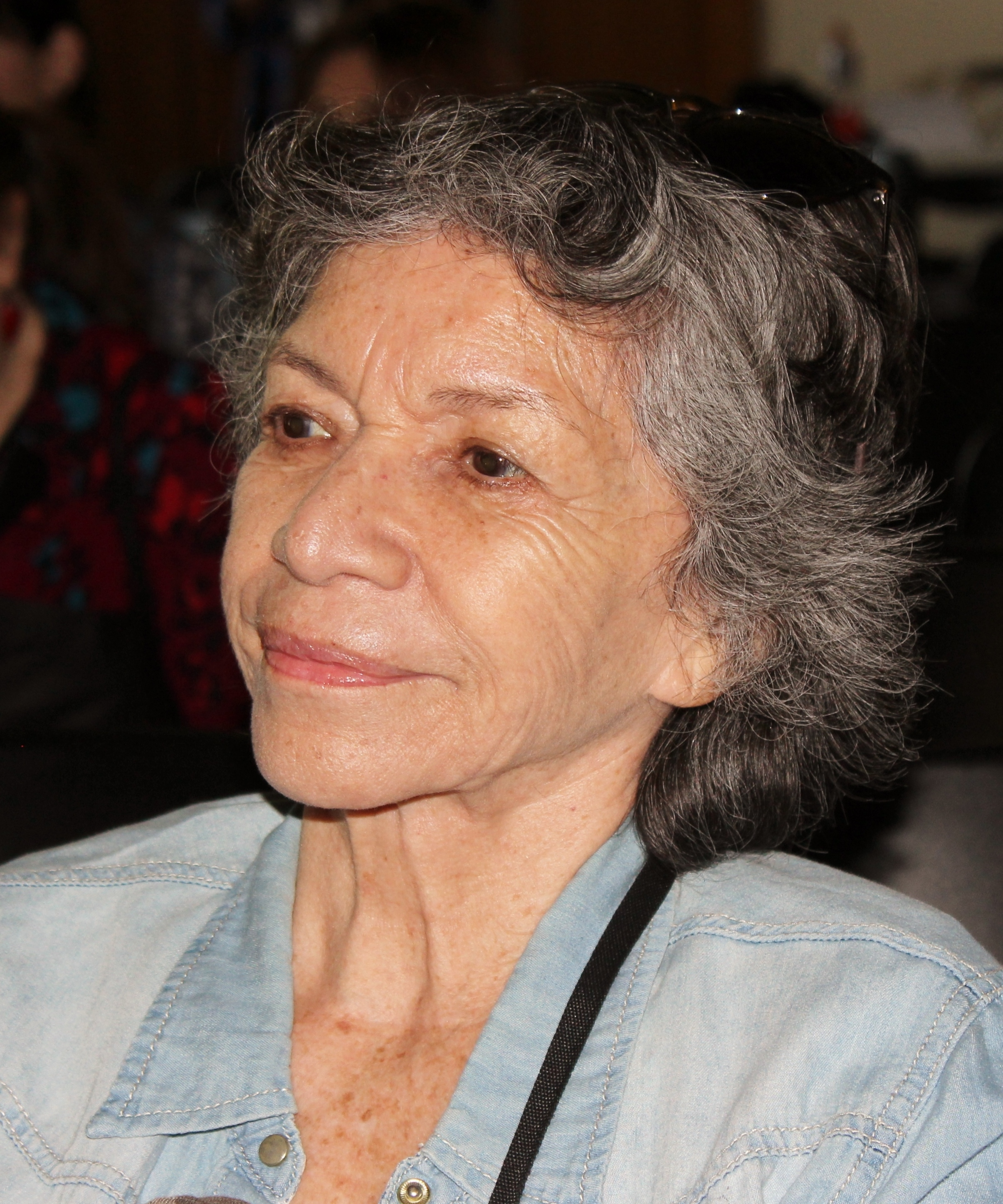
- Isabel Parra in 2018

Background information
- Born: Violeta Isabel Cereceda Parra; 29 September 1939 (age 86)
- Origin: Santiago, Chile Chile
- Genres: Folk, Singer-Songwriter, Andean music, Latin music, Chilean music, Nueva canción
- Occupation: Singer-songwriter
- Instruments: Spanish Guitar, Charango, Cuatro, vocals
- Years active: 1959–present
- Label: Warner Music
- Website: iparra.scd.cl// (in Spanish)

Violeta Isabel Cereceda Parra (born 29 September 1939), better known as Isabel Parra, is a famous Chilean singer-songwriter and interpreter of Latin American musical folklore.

== Early years ==
Parra was born in Chile in 1939 and began her career in music at the age of 13 when she made her first recording with her world-renowned mother, the folklorist Violeta Parra. She has since interpreted and recorded the songs of some of the most famous Latin American folk singers.

== Career ==
After the 11 September 1973 Chilean coup d'état she lived in exile in Argentina and France for many years. She returned to Chile when democracy returned to her country.

Parra has toured extensively during her career and was a distinctive figure in the Nueva Canción Chilena (New Chilean Song) movement. Isabel Parra is also the sister of the famous folk singer Ángel Parra and the niece of the famous poet Nicanor Parra.

== Discography ==
- Isabel Parra (1966)
- Isabel Parra, vol II (1968)
- Cantando por amor [Singing for love] (1969)
- Violeta Parra (1970)
- De aquí y de allá [From here from there] (with Patricio Castillo) (1971)
- Canto para una semilla [Song for a Seed] (Inti-Illimani + Isabel Parra + Carmen Bunster) (1972)
- Isabel Parra y parte del Grupo de Experimentación Sonora del ICAIC (Isabel Parra + GESI + Patricio Castillo) (1972)
- Vientos del pueblo [Winds of the People] (con Patricio Castillo) (1974)
- Isabel Parra de Chile [Isabel Parra of Chile] (1976)
- Recital Club Vanguardia [Live at Club Vanguardia] (with Patricio Castillo) (1976)
- Cantos de Violeta (Songs of Violeta Parra) (1977)
- Canto para una semilla (con Inti-Illimani + Marés González; Texto: Violeta Parra; Música: Luis Advis) (1978)
- Canto per un seme (with Inti-Illimani + Edmonda Aldini) Italian Edition (1978)
- Isabel Parra en Cuba (with Patricio Castillo (1978)
- Acerca de quien soy y no soy (Regarding who I am and whom I am not) (1979)
- Tu voluntad más fuerte que el destierro (Your will is stronger than exile) (1983)
- Chant pour une semence (con Inti-Illimani + Francesca Solleville) French Edition (1985)
- Enlaces (Links) (1987)
- Lámpara melodiosa (Como dos ríos) (Melodic lamp [Like two rivers]) (1994)
- Colores (Colours) (2000)
- Poemas (Poemas) (2002)
- Ni toda la tierra entera (Nor all the Earth complete) (CD del libro) (2003)

== See also ==
- Parra family
