= Sello Alerce =

Chilean record label

Alerce, la otra música
- Formation: 1976
- Founder: Ricardo García
- Dissolved: 2011
- Type: Record label
- Website: www.selloalerce.cl

Alerce, la otra música, also known Sello Alerce, was an independent record Chilean label, founded in 1976 by the journalist and radio executive Ricardo García, with the main objective being to supporting upcoming national folk artists, and to re-edit the albums that were prohibited under the military dictatorship.

The label has a vast compilation of albums from famous artists belonging to the Nueva Canción Chilena movement, such as Quilapayún, Ángel Parra, Atahualpa Yupanqui, Barroco Andino, Patricio Manns, Congreso, Tito Fernández, and Víctor Jara, along with various more modern musical groups, such as Sexual Democracia, Los Tres, Jorge González, Manuel García, Bbs Paranoicos, and Chancho en Piedra. They also worked with the soundtrack band of the infantile program Pin Pon, which was a huge success in Chile during the 1960s and 1970s.

In 2011, Alerce aimed to protect the patrimonial value of its record archive, delivering its musical catalog in the form of an archive to the National Library of Chile.

To these days, Alerce continues as a record label, directed by Viviana and Mónica Larrea, focused mainly in streaming and physical formats as vinyls (www.selloalerce.cl)
