= Se Remata el Siglo =

Studio album by Los Tres
- Released: 06 Abril 1993
- Recorded: February 1993
- Genre: Rock, grunge, hard rock
- Label: Sony Music Chile
- Producer: Mario Breuer

Los Tres chronology
Los Tres (1991)	Se Remata el Siglo (1993)	La Espada & la Pared (1995)

Se Remata el Siglo is the second studio album by Chilean rock band Los Tres, released in 1993.

This album features a more powerful, strong rock sound than its predecessor, incorporating hard rock and grunge elements. Also is the first Los Tres album to feature an instrumental song (Follaje en el Invernadero and No Sabes Qué Desperdicio Tengo en el Alma).

== Track listing ==
1. "No Sabes Qué Desperdicio Tengo en el Alma" (Álvaro Henríquez, Roberto Lindl) — 4:35
2. "Se Remata el Siglo I" (Henríquez, Lindl) — 2:22
3. "Se Remata el Siglo II" (Henríquez, Lindl, Ángel Parra, Francisco Molina) — 2:58
4. "Soñé Que Estabas Justo Sobre Mí" (Henríquez, Lindl, Parra, Molina) — 4:01
5. "Follaje en el Invernadero" (Henríquez) — 3:52
6. El Aval (Henríquez) — 3:06
7. "Gato por Liebre" (Henríquez, Parra, Lindl) — 3:57
8. "Piratas" (Henríquez, Molina, Lindl, Parra) — 3:22
9. "Feliz de Perder" (Henríquez) — 3:40
10. "El Sueño de la Hora Más Oscura" (Henríquez) — 3:24
- Bonus tracks
1. "The Thrill is Gone" (Rick Darnell, Roy Hawkins) — 3:51
  - Original from B.B. King
2. "Por Qué No Viniste" (Henríquez) — 3:19
