= Roberto Parra Sandoval =

- Also known as: El Tío Roberto
- Born: Luis Roberto Parra Sandoval; June 29, 1921; Santiago, Chile
- Died: April 21, 1995 (aged 73)
- Genres: Folk; Cueca
- Instrument: Guitar

Luis Roberto Parra Sandoval (June 29, 1921 – April 21, 1995), also known as El Tío Roberto (Uncle Roberto), was a Chilean singer-songwriter and guitarist, member of the Parra family, many of whose members are famous artists.

== Biography ==
=== Early times ===
Luis Roberto Parra Sandoval born on June 29, 1921 in Santiago de Chile, is the fifth child of Rosa Clarisa Sandoval Navarrete and Nicanor Parra Alarcón. He spent much of his childhood in the southern cities of Chillán and Lautaro and contributed to the family budget by working as a newspaper seller, tomb cleaner, shoe shiner and confetti seller in circuses. He with his siblings Violeta, Eduardo and Hilda dedicated themselves to singing and carrying out various activities in squares, markets, circuses and various venues to help their family, touring cities such as Chillán and Parral. After the death of his father Nicanor Parra in 1929, his family went to the capital of Santiago to seek better economic opportunities.

At fourteen, he began to consolidate his profession as a guitarist, working as a musician in various circuses, cabarets and clubs in southern Chile. From 1935 to the late 50s he became known as an ambient musician, traveling from north to south to enliven provincial life. In 1938 he formed the duo Los Hermanos Parra with Eduardo. During these times he worked in various trades such as: laborer in the Valparaíso dam, guide, newspaper seller, polisher, transporter of food for a prison inmate, welder, mechanic's assistant, carpenter and owner of a furniture store.

In improvised presentations in all kinds of nightclubs, he conceived a style that would become known under the name of "jazz guachaca", a style that takes inspiration from people such as the American pianist Charlie Kunz, the trombonist and arranger Tommy Dorsey and the gypsy-Belgian guitarist Django Reinhardt. And that he also took various elements from the cueca, tango, bolero, corrido, Foxtrot and jazz.

La Negra Ester

In September 1957, he arrived for the first time in the Chilean port of San Antonio, where he was hired to sing with the orchestra of the cabaret Luces del Puerto. In the boite Río de Janeiro, he met La Negra Ester, a prostitute and performer of the boite. They started a sentimental relationship that was immortalized in his book Décimas de la Negra Ester, a poetry book written in décimas. Andrés Pérez Araya, director of the theater company Gran Circo Teatro, later adapted La Negra Ester for the stage; the stage adaptation became a milestone in Chilean theater.

== Discography ==
- 1965: 20 cuecas con salsa verde (credited to the "Trio Los Parra")
- 1966: Carpa de La Reina (with various artists)
- 1967: Las cuecas de Roberto Parra (re-released as CD in 1995)
- 1972: Las cuecas del Tío Roberto (with Ángel Parra)
- 1990: El jazz guachaca (with several artists)
- 1990: Los tiempos de La Negra Ester
- 1998: Peineta (with Los Tres and Lalo Parra)

== Filmography ==
Year	Title	Role	Director	Notes
1991	Esto es jazz huachaca	—N/a	Guieseppe Brucculeri	Composer
1996	Prontuario de Roberto Parra	—N/a	Hermann Mondaca; Ximena Arrieta	
1999	El desquite	—N/a	Andrés Wood	Film based on the play by Roberto Parra

== Works ==
- Poesía popular, cuecas choras y la Negra Ester (1996)
- El Golpe (1998)
- Cuecas (2008)
- Soy zurdo de nacimiento: las cuecas de Roberto Parra (2011)
- Roberto Parra. La vida que yo he pasado (2012)
- Vida, pasión y muerte de Violeta Parra (2013)
