= Ángel Parra (singer-songwriter) =

Chilean singer and songwriter

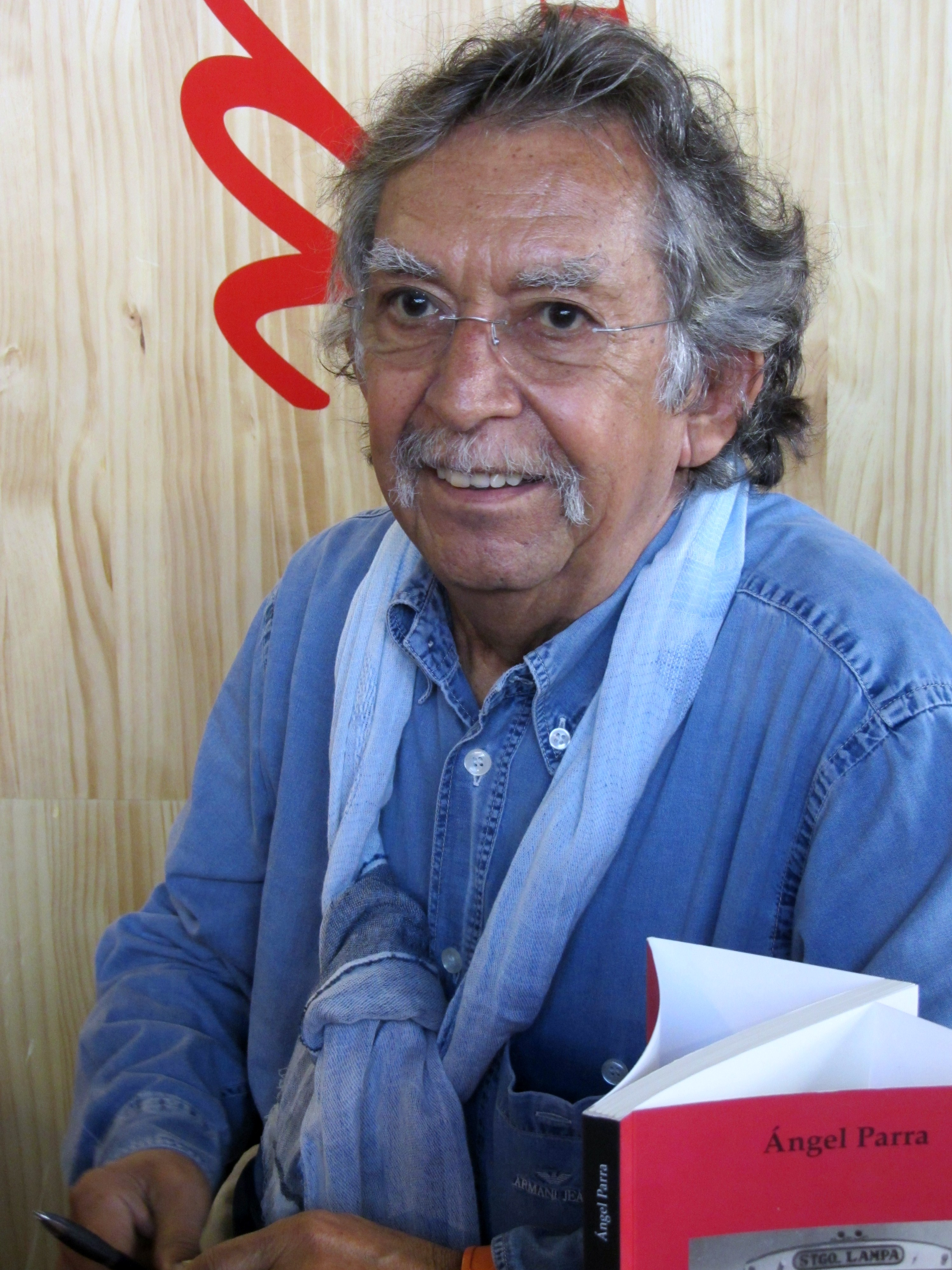
- Parra in 2015

Background information
- Born: Luis Ángel Cereceda Parra; 27 June 1943; Valparaíso, Chile
- Died: 11 March 2017 (aged 73) Paris, France
- Genres: Nueva canción chilena; folk music; protest song; bolero
- Occupation: Singer-songwriter
- Instruments: Voice; guitar; guitarrón chileno

Luis Ángel Cereceda Parra (27 June 1943 – 11 March 2017), known as Ángel Parra, was a Chilean singer-songwriter and key figure in the Nueva canción chilena musical movement.

== Biography ==
Parra was born on 27 June 1943 in Valparaíso to Luis Cereceda Arenas and Violeta Parra. Parra's mother was a composer, singer-songwriter, folklorist, ethnomusicologist, visual artist and key figure in the Nueva canción chilena musical movement. Parra was the younger brother of Isabel Parra a fellow singer-songwriter, folklorist and member of Nueva canción chilena.

In 1965, Parra and his sister founded 'La peña de los Parra', a venue for folk music, which became a focal point for the Nueva Cancion movement.

After the Chilean military coup in September 1973, Parra was tortured in the National Stadium, then imprisoned in the Chacabuco prison camp.. He later left the country, and lived in exile for many years.

Parra traveled abroad helping to maintain the Nueva Canción tradition in Chilean expatriate communities in Europe, North America, and Australia. His son Ángel Cereceda Orrego, also known as Ángel Parra, is the lead guitarist for the band Los Tres.

Parra died of lung cancer in Paris, France, on 11 March 2017, aged 73.

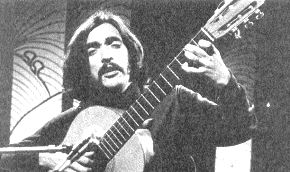
Ángel Parra in 1973.

== See also ==
- Parra family
