= Violeta Parra =

Chilean musician and folklorist (1917–1967)

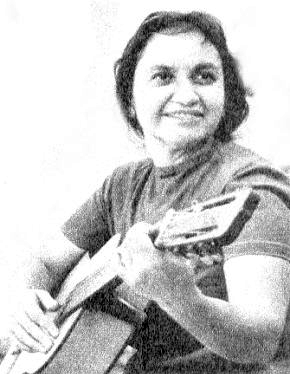

Background information
- Born: Violeta del Carmen Parra Sandoval; 4 October 1917; San Fabián de Alico or San Carlos, Chile
- Died: 5 February 1967 (aged 49) Santiago, Chile
- Genres: Folk, experimental, nueva canción, cueca
- Occupations: Singer-songwriter, Visual arts
- Instruments: Vocals, Guitar, Charango, Cuatro, Percussion, Harp
- Years active: 1939–1967
- Labels: EMI-Odeon; Alerce; Warner Music Group (all posthumous)
- Website: web.archive.org/web/20000621221302/http://www.violetaparra.scd.cl/index.htm/

Violeta del Carmen Parra Sandoval (Spanish pronunciation: [bjoˈleta ˈpara]; 4 October 1917 – 5 February 1967) was a Chilean composer, singer-songwriter, folklorist, ethnomusicologist and visual artist. She pioneered the Nueva Canción Chilena (The Chilean New Song), a renewal and a reinvention of Chilean folk music that would extend its sphere of influence outside Chile.

Her birthdate (4 October) was chosen as "Chilean Musicians' Day." In 2011, Andrés Wood directed a biopic about her, titled Violeta Went to Heaven (Spanish: Violeta se fue a los cielos).

== Early life ==
There is some uncertainty as to exactly where Violeta Parra was born. The stamp on her birth certificate says she was born in San Carlos, Ñuble Province, a small town in southern Chile on 4 October 1917, as Violeta del Carmen Parra Sandoval. However, both the Violeta Parra Foundation (Fundación Violeta Parra) and the Violeta Parra Museum (Museo Violeta Parra) state on their websites that she was born in San Fabián de Alico, 40 km from San Carlos.

Violeta Parra was one of nine children in the prolific Parra family. Her father, Nicanor Parra Alarcón, was a music teacher. Her mother, Clarisa Sandoval Navarrete had grown up in the countryside and was a seamstress. She sang and played the guitar, and taught Violeta and her siblings traditional folk songs. Among her brothers were the notable modern poet, better known as the "anti-poet," Nicanor Parra (1914–2018), and fellow folklorist Roberto Parra (1921–1995). Her son, Ángel Parra, and her daughter, Isabel Parra, are also important figures in the development of the Nueva Canción Chilena. Their children have also mostly maintained the family's artistic traditions.

Violeta Parra and some of her siblings would perform in Chillán and local towns to help support their family. Her father's lack of success in his own music career led to alcoholism. Two years after Violeta's birth, the family moved to Santiago, then, two years later, to Lautaro and, finally, in 1927, to Chillán. It was in Chillán that Violeta started singing and playing the guitar, together with her siblings Hilda, Eduardo and Roberto; and soon began composing traditional Chilean music.

Parra's father died in 1930 from tuberculosis, and her family's quality of life greatly deteriorated. Violeta and her siblings had to work to help feed the family.

In 1932, at the insistence of her brother Nicanor, Parra moved to Santiago to attend the Normal School, staying with relatives. Later, she moved back with her mother and siblings to Edison Street, in the Quinta Normal district.

== Musical career ==
In the beginning of her career, there was a greater interest in Eurocentric music by the vast majority of the population in Chile.

The Parras performed in nightclubs, such as El Tordo Azul and El Popular, in the Mapocho district, interpreting boleros, rancheras, Mexican corridos and other styles.

Parra took a break from her musical career in 1938 to start a family. In 1944, Parra started to perform again under the name "Violeta de Mayo" (Violeta of May or May Violet). Parra began singing songs of Spanish origin, from the repertoire of the famous Argentinian singers Lolita Torres and Imperio Argentina. She sang in restaurants and also in theatres. In 1945, she appeared with her children Isabel and Angel in a Spanish show in the Casanova confectionery.

Parra and her sister Hilda began singing together as "The Parra Sisters," and they recorded some of their work on RCA VICTOR. Parra continued performing: she appeared in circuses and toured with Hilda and with her children throughout Argentina.

=== The folklorist ===
In 1952, encouraged by her brother Nicanor, Violeta began to collect and collate authentic Chilean folk music from all over the country. She abandoned her old folk-song repertoire and began composing her own songs based on traditional folk forms. She gave recitals at universities, presented by the well-known literary figure Enrique Bello Cruz, founder of several cultural magazines. Soon, Parra was invited to the "Summer School" at the University of Concepción. She was also invited to teach courses in folklore at the University of Iquique. In Valparaiso, she was presented at the Chilean-French Institute.

Parra's two singles for EMI Odeon label, "Que Pena Siente el Alma" and "Verso por el Fin del Mundo," and "Casamiento de Negros" and "Verso por Padecimiento," brought her a good measure of popularity.

Don Isaiah Angulo, a tenant farmer, taught her to play the guitarrón, a traditional Chilean guitar-like instrument with 25 strings.

Along the way, Parra met Pablo Neruda, who introduced her to his friends. In 1970, he would dedicate the poem "Elegia para Cantar" to her.

Between January and September 1954, Parra hosted the immensely successful radio program Sing Violeta Parra for Radio Chilena. The program was most often recorded in places where folk music was performed, such as her mother's restaurant in Barrancas. At the end of 1954, Parra participated in another folkloric program for Radio Agriculture.

=== First trip to Europe ===
Violeta was invited to the World Festival of Youth and Students, in Warsaw, Poland, in July 1955. She then moved to Paris, France, where she performed at the nightclub "L'Escale" in the Quartier Latin.

Violeta made contacts with European artists and intellectuals. Through the intervention of the anthropologist Paul Rivet, she recorded at the National Sound Archive of the "Musée de l'Homme" in Paris, where she left a guitarrón and tapes of her collections of Chilean folklore. She travelled to London to make recordings for EMI-Odeon and radio broadcasts from the BBC. Back in Paris, in March 1956, she recorded 16 songs for the French label "Chant du Monde" which launched its first two records with 8 songs each.

=== Return to Chile ===
In November 1957, Violeta returned to Chile and recorded the first LP of the series The Folklore of Chile for the EMI Odeon label, Violeta Parra and her Guitar (Canto y Guitarra), which included three of her own compositions. She followed with the second volume of The Folklore of Chile in 1958, Acompañada de Guitarra. In 1959, she released La cueca and La tonada. The following year, she founded the National Museum of Folkloric Art (Museo Nacional de Arte Folklórico) in Concepción, under the University of Concepción (Universidad de Concepción). During this time, she composed many décimas, a Latin American poetry form for which she is well known.

In the following years, she built her house "Casa de Palos" on Segovia Street in the municipality of La Reina. She continued giving recitals in major cultural centers in Santiago, travelling all over the country to research, organize concerts, and give lectures and workshops about folklore. She travelled north to investigate and record the religious festival "La Tirana."

Violeta Parra exerted a significant influence on Héctor Pavez and Gabriela Pizarro, who would become great performers and researchers in their own right. The product of this collaboration is evident in the play "La Celebración de la Minga" staged at the Teatro Municipal de Santiago.

She composed the music for the documentaries Wicker and Trilla, and contributed to the film Casamiento de negros, performed by Sergio Bravo.

She wrote the book Cantos Folklóricos Chilenos, which gathered all the research conducted so far, with photographs by Sergio Larraín and musical scores performed by Gastón Soublette (Santiago, Nascimento, 1979). She also wrote the Décimas autobiográficas, work in verse recounting her life from her childhood to her trip to Europe.

On 4 October 1960, the day of her birthday, she met Swiss clarinetist Gilbert Favre with whom she became romantically involved. In 1961, she traveled to Buenos Aires, Argentina, where she exhibited her paintings, appeared on TV, gave recitals at the Teatro IFT, and recorded an album of original songs for EMI Odeon – which was banned.

=== Second trip to Europe ===
In June 1962 she returned to Santiago. With her children Isabel and Angel, and her granddaughter Tita, she embarked, with the Chilean delegation, for Finland to participate in the 8th "World Festival of Youth and Students" held in Helsinki. After touring the Soviet Union, Germany, Italy and France, Violeta Parra moved to Paris, where she performed at La Candelaria and L'Escale, in the Latin Quarter, gave recitals at the "Théâtre Des Nations" of UNESCO and performed on radio and television with her children.

She then started living with Gilbert Favre in Geneva, dividing her time between France and Switzerland, where she also gave concerts, appeared in TV and exhibited her art.

In 1963, she recorded in Paris revolutionary and peasant songs, which would be published in 1971 under the title Songs rediscovered in Paris. She wrote the book Popular Poetry of the Andes. The Parras took part in the concert of "L'Humanité" (official newspaper of the French Communist Party). An Argentine musician friend recorded at her home a version of "El Gavilán" ("The Hawk"), interpreted by Violeta Parra accompanied by her granddaughter on percussion. Violeta accompanied her children in the LP Los Parra de Chillán for the Barclay label. She began playing the cuatro, an instrument of Venezuelan origin, and the charango, an instrument of Bolivian origin.

=== Return to South America ===
Parra returned to South America with Gilbert Favre, in June 1965. Violeta recorded two 45s, one with her daughter Isabel and another to instrumental music for cuatro and quena with Gilbert Favre, whom she christened "El Tocador Afuerino" (The outsider musician). Her music now incorporated the Venezuelan cuatro and the Bolivian charango. EMI Odeon circulated the LP Remembering Chile (a Chilean in Paris), whose cover was illustrated with her own arpilleras. Soon after, however, Favre and Parra separated, provoked by his desire to live in Bolivia where he was part of a successful Bolivian music act, Los Jairas.

Parra's energy was invested in reviving a version of the Peña (now known as "La Peña de Los Parra"), a community center for the arts and for political activism. Parra's Peña was a tent (somewhat similar looking to a circus tent) that she set up on a 30 x 30-meter piece of land in the Parque La Quintrala, at number 340 Carmen Street, in today's La Reina municipality of Santiago, in the area once known as la Cañada. Her tent hosted musical spectacles where she often sang with her children, and she and her children also lived on the same land. In La Reina, at La Cañada 7200, she also established a cultural center called "La Carpa de la Reina" inaugurated on 17 December 1965. She also installed a folk peña in the International Fair of Santiago (FISA), where she was invited. On the same year, she participated in numerous national television programs and signed a contract with Radio Minería which would be the last radio station to be used as a platform for her work.

Under the EMI Odeón label, she released the LP La Carpa de La Reina in 1966, featuring three songs performed by Violeta Parra and nine by guest artists announced at the carpa by Violeta herself. She travelled to La Paz to meet with Gilbert Favre, where she regularly appeared in the Peña Naira. She came back to Chile with Altiplano groups, presenting them in her carpa, on television, and in her children's Peña. She also performed in concert at the Chilean southern cities of Osorno and Punta Arenas, invited by René Largo Farias, under the "Chile Ríe y Canta" ("Chile Laughs and Sings") program. Accompanied by her children and Uruguayan Alberto Zapicán, she recorded for RCA Victor the LP The Last Compositions of Violeta Parra. In that year, Favre returned briefly to Chile with his group, but declined to stay, because in the meantime he had married in Bolivia.

=== "Gracias a la vida" ===
Parra composed "Gracias a la vida" in La Paz, Bolivia in 1966. In 1971 the song was popularized throughout Latin America by Mercedes Sosa in her album, Homenaje a Violeta Parra, and later in Brazil by Elis Regina and in the US by Joan Baez. It remains one of the most covered Latin American songs in history. Other covers of the folk anthem include the Italian guitar-vocal solo of Adriana Mezzadri and La Oreja de Van Gogh at the 2005 Viña del Mar International Song Festival. It has been treated by classically trained musicians such as in the fully orchestrated rendition by conservatory-trained Alberto Cortez. The song was re-recorded by several Latin artists, Canadian Michael Bublé to gather funds for the Chilean people affected by the earthquake in Chile, February 2010, and American singer-songwriter Kacey Musgraves from her fifth studio album Star-Crossed.

It opens with a very common shift between A minor and E major chords, then it goes to G7-C/C7 before returning to the Am/E motif. "Gracias a la vida" was written and recorded in 1964–65, following Parra's separation from her long-term partner. It was released in Las Últimas Composiciones (1966), the last album Parra published before taking her life in 1967.

Parra's lyrics are ambiguous at first: the song may be read as a romantic celebration of life and individual experience, but the circumstances surrounding the song suggest that Parra also intended the song as a sort of suicide note, thanking life for all it has given her. It may be read as ironic, pointing out that a life full of good health, opportunity and worldly experience may not offer any consolation to grief and the contradictory nature of the human condition.

Gracias a la vida que me ha dado tanto
Me dio dos luceros que cuando los abro
Perfecto distingo lo negro del blanco
Y en el alto cielo su fondo estrellado
Y en las multitudes el hombre que yo amo

Translated into English:

Thanks to life, which has given me so much
It gave me two bright stars that when I open them,
I perfectly distinguish the black from white
And in the sky above, her starry backdrop
And within the multitudes the man I love

=== "Volver a los Diecisiete" ===
Another highly regarded song – the last she wrote – is "Volver a los Diecisiete" ("Being Seventeen Again"). It celebrates the themes of youthful life, in tragic contrast to her biography. Unlike much popular music, it moves through minor key progression creating an introspective if not melancholy mood and thus has lent itself to classical treatment as well as popular music.

Parra's music is deeply rooted in folk song traditions, as she was considered part of the Nueva Canción movement. Her involvement was as a forerunner in the 1950s and increasing the popularity of folk music.

== Artistic career ==
During Parra's travels collecting musical traditions, she also collected artistic practices. She developed a serious interest in ceramics, painting and arpillera embroidery. As a result of severe hepatitis in 1959 that forced her to stay in bed, her work as a painter and arpillerista was developed greatly, so much so that that same year, she exhibited her oil paintings and arpilleras at both the First and Second Outdoor Exhibition of Fine Arts in Santiago's Parque Forestal.

In April 1964 she did an exhibition of her arpilleras, oil paintings and wire sculptures in the Museum of Decorative Arts of the Louvre – the first solo exhibition of a Latin American artist at the museum. In 1965, the publisher François Maspero, Paris, published her book Poésie Populaire des Andes. In Geneva, Swiss television made a documentary about the artist and her work, Violeta Parra, Chilean Embroiderer.

Many of her art works center around folk tales and the oral histories she collected in her efforts to preserve them. These include her paintings, Las tres pascualas, Casamiento de negros, and Machitún. Each of these paintings are inspired by Chilean folk tales and all are oil paint on wood. Her painting style is simplistic; Parra avoided realism to allow the stories, themes, and context of the paintings to come through without distractions.

== Personal life ==
In 1934, she met Luis Cereceda, a railway driver. They got married in 1938, and Parra took time away from her musical career to start a family. They had two children, Isabel (born 1939) and Ángel (born 1943). Her husband was an avid supporter of the Chilean Communist Party. They both became involved in the progressive movement and the Communist Party of Chile, taking part in the presidential campaign of Gabriel González Videla in 1944. They also supported the first-left wing president in Chilean history, Pedro Aguirre Cerda's political campaign.

After 10 years of marriage, in 1948, Parra and Luis Cerceda separated. Parra then met and married Luis Arce in 1949, and their daughter, Carmen Luisa, was born the same year. Their second child, Rosita Clara was born in 1952, but later died in 1955 while Parra was in Europe.

== Death and legacy ==
In 1967, Parra died from a self-inflicted gunshot wound. Several memorials were held after her death, both in Chile and abroad. She was an inspiration for several Latin-American artists, such as Victor Jara and the musical movement of the "Nueva Cancion Chilena", which renewed interest in Chilean folklore.

In 1992, the Violeta Parra Foundation was founded at the initiative of her children, with the aim to group, organize and disseminate her still-unpublished work. Rodolfo Braceli's book Y Ahora, la Resucitada de la Violenta Violeta was adapted into a play called Violeta Viene a Nacer, starring Argentinian actress Virginia Lago in 1993 and 1994. In 1997, with the participation of Violeta Parra Foundation and the Department of Cultural Affairs, Ministry of Foreign Affairs of Chile, her visual work was exhibited in the Museum of Decorative Arts of the Louvre Museum, Paris.

In 2007, the 90th anniversary of her birth was commemorated with an exhibition of her visual work at the Centro Cultural Palacio La Moneda and the release of a collection of her art work titled, "Visual Work of Violeta Parra". 4 October 2015 marked the inauguration of the Violeta Parra Museum (Museo Violeta Parra) in Santiago, Chile. On 4 October 2017, Google celebrated her 100th birthday with a Google Doodle.

== Film ==
Violeta Went to Heaven (Spanish: Violeta se fue a los cielos) is a 2011 Chilean biopic about Parra, directed by Andrés Wood. The film is based on a biography of the same name, written by Ángel Parra, Violeta's son with Luis Cereceda Arenas. Parra collaborated on the film. The film was selected as the Chilean entry for the Best Foreign Language Film at the 84th Academy Awards, but it did not make the final shortlist.The film won Sundance's 2012 World Cinema Dramatic Jury Prize.

== Discography ==
=== Studio albums ===
- Chants et danses du chili Vol. 1 (Le Chant du Monde, 1956)
- Chants et danses du chili. Vol. 2 (Le Chant du Monde, 1956)
- Violeta Parra, Canto y guitarra. El Folklore de Chile, Vol. I (Odeon, 1956)
- Violeta Parra, acompañada de guitarra. El Folklore de Chile, Vol. II (Odeon, 1958)
- La cueca presentada por Violeta Parra: El Folklore de Chile, Vol. III. (Odeon, 1958)
- La tonada presentada por Violeta Parra: El Folklore de Chile, Vol. IV. (Odeon, 1958)
- Toda Violeta Parra: El Folklore de Chile, Vol. VIII (Odeon, 1960)
- Violeta Parra, guitare et chant: Chants et danses du Chili. (Le Chant du Monde, 1963)
- Recordandeo a Chile (Una Chilena en París). (Odeon, 1965)
- Carpa de la Reina (Odeon, 1966)
- Las últimas composiciones de Violeta Parra (RCA Victor, 1966)

=== Posthumous discography ===
- Violeta Parra y sus canciones reencontradas en París (Discoteca del Cantar Popular [Dicap], RCA Victor in Argentina, 1971)
- Canciones de Violeta Parra (Casa de las Américas, 1971)
- Le Chili de Violeta Parra (Arion, 1974)
- Un río de sangre (Arion, 1975)
- Presente / Ausente (Alerce, 1975)
- Décimas (Alerce, 1976)
- Chants & rythmes du Chili (Arion, 1991)
- El hombre con su razón (1992)
- Décimas y Centésimas (Alerce, 1993)
- El folklore y la pasión (EMI, 1994)
- Haciendo Historia: La jardinera y su canto (EMI, 1997)
- Violeta Parra: Antología (Warner Music Chile, 1998)
- Canciones reencontradas en París (Warner Music Chile, 1999)
- Composiciones para guitarra (Warner Music Chile, 1999)
- Violeta Parra – En Ginebra, En Vivo, 1965 (Warner Music Chile, 1999)
- Violeta Parra: Cantos Campesinos (Alerce, 1999)
