= Álvaro Henríquez =

Chilean musician

- Henríquez in 2024
- Born: Álvaro Felipe Henríquez Pettinelli; 18 October 1969 (age 57); Concepción, Chile
- Occupations: Singer-songwriter; multi-instrumentalist
- Spouse: Julieta Venegas (m. 1998; div. 2000)
- Musical career
- Origin: Concepción, Chile
- Genres: Latin rock; rockabilly; alternative rock; electronic
- Instruments: Vocals; bass guitar; guitar; keyboards
- Years active: 1987–present
- Label: Warner (2004)

Álvaro Felipe Henríquez Pettinelli (born 18 October 1969) is a Chilean singer-songwriter, best known for being the vocalist and guitarist of the band Los Tres and Pettinellis considered by MusicaPopular.cl to be "the great musical symbol of the 1990s in Chile".

== Personal life ==
His uncle, Alfredo Pettinelli, was a professional football goalkeeper nicknamed Loco (Crazy), who played for clubs such as Naval de Talcahuano, Lota Schwager, Rangers de Talca, among others.
