= Los Tres =

Chilean rock band

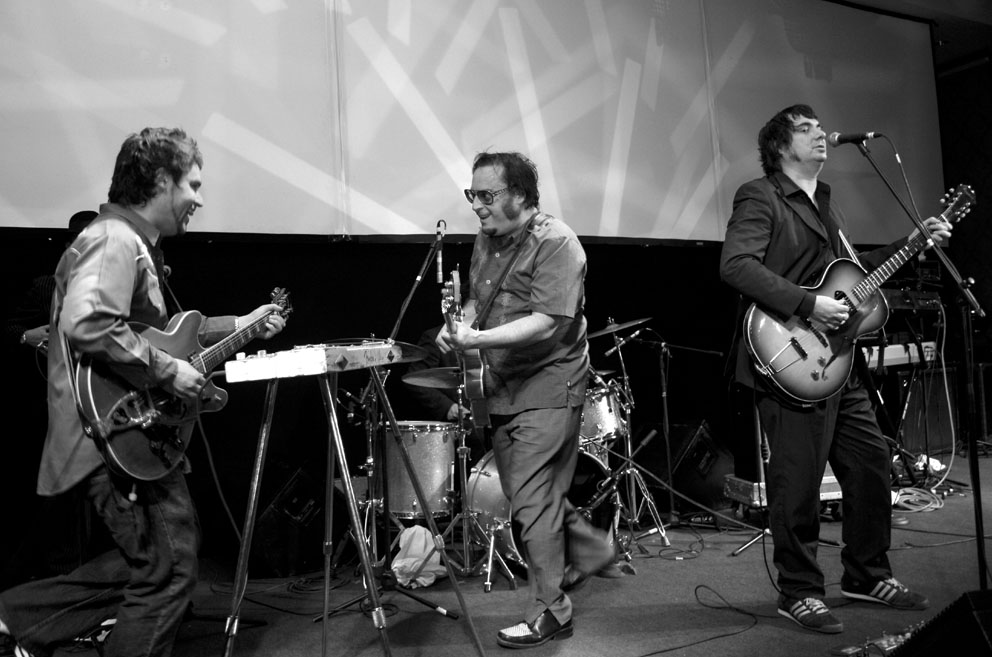
- Parra, Lindl, and Henríquez in 2006

Background information
- Origin: Concepción, Chile
- Genres: Alternative rock; blues rock; rockabilly; Latin alternative; folk rock
- Years active: 1987–2000; 2006–present
- Labels: Sello Alerce; Sony Music Chile; La Oreja; Feria Music; Universal Music Group
- Members: Álvaro Henríquez; Ángel Parra Jr.; Roberto "Titae" Lindl; Francisco Molina
- Past members: Cuti Aste; Boris Ramirez; Sebastian Cabib; Manuel Basualto

Los Tres (Spanish: [los ˈtɾes], lit. 'The Three') is a Chilean rock band, formed in 1987 in Concepción by Álvaro Henríquez, Roberto "Titae" Lindl, Francisco Molina and Ángel Parra Jr. They are one of the most influential rock en español bands.

== History ==
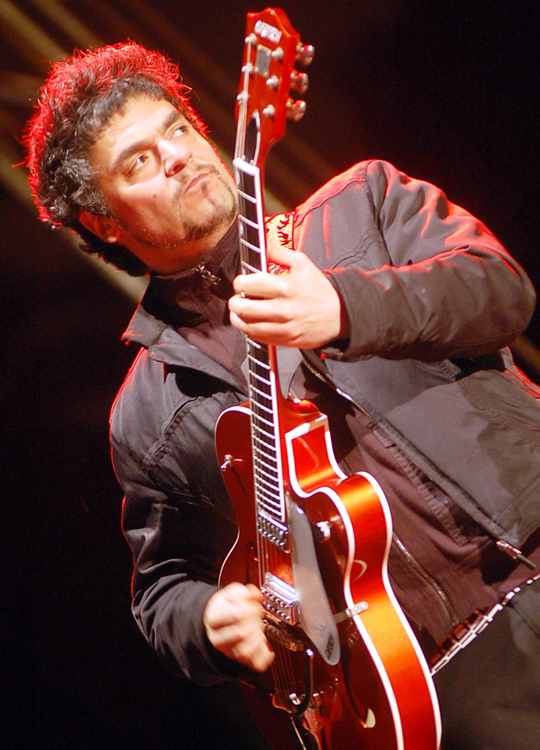
Ángel Parra Jr. in 2010

The origins of the band go back to the Concepción of 1982, when three friends from the Charles de Gaulle school, Álvaro Henríquez Petinelli, Roberto Titae Lindl Romero, and Francisco Molina Cornejo, decided to form the band Dick Stones. Together with Gilles Marie, Rodolfo Lindl and Fernando Saavedra, they appeared in bars, universities and local events to sing songs by Elvis Presley, Chuck Berry and Gene Vincent. Later, Henriquez and Titae would join drummer Andrés Valdovinos to form the band Escalimetros.

In 1984, Henríquez and Lindl, together with guitarist Jorge Yogui Alvarado (future leader of the Chilean band Emociones Clandestinas), changed the name of their band to Los Ilegales. Lindl returned from Austria, where he came to work with the Salzburg Symphony Orchestra, and in March 1987, Álvaro, Titae and Pancho committed to a more professional job under the name Los Tres, shortly before a concert at the Lord Cochrane gymnasium. His debut was in 1987 at the Mapocho Cultural Center, Santiago de Chile.

However, Roberto Lindl joined the Youth Symphony Orchestra for a time as a double bass player, and Álvaro Henríquez strengthened ties with theatrical circles and one of his first commissions was to musicalize the work Y Warhol (1988). The definitive impulse for the trio came with the incorporation of Ángel Parra, a guitarist who had until then had a long instrumental preparation and several studies in Paris and California. The price received by Chilean rock was very low and in addition to that, the first self-titled album by Los Tres published at the Le Trianon restaurant on September 4, 1991, took a long time to be taken into account by the national media.

During their adolescence, penquistas worked on many of the songs on that first album. ("Penquista" is a Chilean term used to refer to the inhabitants or natives of Concepcion.) Later the Rock & Pop radio gradually turned Los Tres into a popular name. The band passed from Alerce to Sony Music and they published "Se Remata el Siglo" in 1993. Los Tres had a foreign producer, in this case the Argentinian Mario Breuer. The release of the album, at the Oz discoteque, had the character of a social event. Rougher than their 1991 debut and they even cited AC/DC as one of their influences. Although this album facilitated Los Tres's passage to massive status, the members later stated that they were never satisfied with Breuer's production, since "it was very strange for us to work with a guy who tried to achieve an average between us and La Ley."

In June 1994, they made a series of presentations in the SCD room in Santiago together with Roberto Parra embodied in the 1998 album Peineta, and in 1995, Los Tres released "La espada y la pared", an album that in that same year peaked at No. 1. On September 14 of that same year, Los Tres became the first Chilean group to be invited to the unplugged party that for a few years, had been animating the MTV-Latino video music chain. The band traveled to Miami and recorded their participation with the collaboration of Cuti Aste and guitarist Antonio Restucci, combining in it a repertoire of greatest hits along with a new song Traje desastre and three tribute titles to the Chilean singer-songwriter Roberto Parra, who died a few months prior to that event. The album corresponding to the show, Los Tres unplugged (1996) became a sales phenomenon that defied any marketing theory that, until then, was handled in the Chilean music industry. Since in that same year it won 110,000 copies, much more than "Neither by reason, nor by force" by Los Prisioneros.

In February of that year, the group had debuted at the Viña del Mar Festival, paying tribute to their school friendship with Charles de Gaulle uniforms on stage. Furthermore, Álvaro Henríquez was greatly influenced by the Chilean singer-songwriter Roberto Parra. For the band, the Chilean cueca became a major genre, which they sought to address according to a more modern approach, hence the tradition of eighteenth-century parties that the group inaugurated in 1996 under the name La Yein Fonda, and that for For the first time, it brought together cuequeros, cumbiancheros and rockers on the same stage. In 1997 they participated in a mega-concert at the Estadio Nacional known as "Made in Chile", in which they joined together with Los Jaivas and Illapu.

In 1997, Fome was released, an album of fierce electricity and uncomfortable verses about fame, violent deaths and boredom; "Me Arrendé" and "Toco Fondo" were two eloquent titles. The latter was a work recorded in the town of Woodstock, near New York, and that made the group's sales drop due to its demanding sound. A little later, a box appeared containing the band's first four studio albums. The efforts they invested in reproducing their success in the Mexican market gradually wore down their internal relationships, since their music was not the universal pop of La Ley, and their type of rock demanded more explanations than the group was willing to do. On successive trips starting in 1995, Los Tres offered presentations in venues of moderate capacity and the occasional massive gathering, such as at the Guadalajara Book Fair in 1999.

Although all their albums were released in that market, the band never seemed completely convinced of the price to pay for continental fame, like the one La Ley was pursuing at the time: "We would never move to Mexico. I went to Chile because it is a very small country" they affirmed. The group had an amazing subsequent recognition from that country, when the successful Cafe Tacuba chose six of their songs to publish the tribute album, "Vale callampa" in 2002.

== Lineup ==
=== Members ===
- Álvaro Henríquez, voice and rhythm guitar. (1987-2000; 2006-)
- Roberto Titae Lindl, bass guitar, double bass, accordion, backing vocals. (1987-2000; 2006-)
- Francisco Molina (1987-2000; 2023-), drums and percussions.
- Ángel Parra (1988-2000; 2006-2013; 2023-), lead guitar, lap steel, backing vocals.

=== Past members ===
- Cuti Aste – keyboards, accordion (1991-1996; 2017-2023)
- Boris Ramírez – drums (2012-2023)
- Sebastián Cabib – lead guitar (2013-2023)
- Manuel Basualdo – drums (2006-2012)

== Discography ==
=== Studio albums ===
- Los Tres (1991)
- Se Remata el Siglo (1993)
- La Espada & la Pared (1995)
- Fome (1997)
- La Sangre en el Cuerpo (1999)
- Hágalo Usted Mismo (2006)
- Coliumo (2010)
- XCLNT (2026)

=== Extended plays ===
- Por Acanga (2015)
- Revuelta (2024)

=== Live albums ===
- MTV Unplugged (1995)
- La Yein Fonda (1996)
- Freno de Mano (2000)
- Vermouth & Noche (2001)
- Arena (2007)
- 33 Horas Bar (2009)
- Unplugged 20 años (2017)
- Rarezas (2023)
- Revuelta en vivo (2025)

=== Compilations ===
- Grandes Éxitos (2006)
- Viajando por Chile (2016)
- Los Tres 1991-1999 (2024)
- Camino 2006-2024 (2024)
