= Chilean rock =

Rock music made in Chile or by Chileans

Rock music in Chile
- Other names: Chilean rock
- Stylistic origins: Rockabilly, rock and roll, twist, Psychedelic rock, Chilean folk music
- Cultural origins: 1950s — 1960s, Chile

Chilean rock is rock music and its corresponding subgenres produced in Chile or by Chileans. Chilean rock lyrics are usually sung in Spanish so can be considered as part of rock en español, although they are sometimes sung in English as well.

Rock music was first produced in Chile in the late 1950s by bands that imitated, and sometimes translated, international rock and roll hits from the U.S. This movement was known as the Nueva Ola (New Wave). Although original bands started to emerge as well in the early 1960s.

During the second half of the 1960s, after the success of rock and roll music, the Nueva Canción Chilena (New Chilean Song) and Fusión latinoamericana (Latin American fusion) genres were born in Chile, bringing to fame artists like Violeta Parra and Víctor Jara as extremely influential folk singers, or Los Jaivas and Congreso who were more instrumentally elaborated.

In the 1970s, however, there was a decline in the country's rock scene as a result of the military dictatorship imposed by the 1973 coup d'état. From 1973 to 1990, all forms of rock music were prohibited (along with an important part of the cultural life), causing stagnation in the music industry. Nevertheless, an underground scene grew up with new genres such as heavy metal, punk and new wave music. Los Prisioneros were the most outstanding band of this era.

The 1990s saw the beginning of a revival for Chilean rock music, with several Chilean bands finding international success along with the growth of many rock subgenres such as alternative rock, pop rock, funk rock, reggae, grunge, britpop or latin rock becoming commercially successful. Los Tres became the most iconic rock band of this era, alongside La Ley in pop.

In the early 21st century, many more independent artists have become increasingly popular, while the previous ones have consolidated generating a cultural legacy of wide variety and trajectory. Synth pop, neo-folk rock, latin rock, alternative rock and pop rock are recently successful subgenres, but are harder to categorize due to their fusion and indie natures.

Although frequently omitted from mass media preferring commercial foreign music instead, Chile has an extensive and rich rock culture, a permanent underground scene with hundreds of recognized bands, many niches of varied alternative sub-genres, as well as powerful regional scenes in Concepción and Valparaíso.

== Early rock and roll and Nueva Ola (1955–1965) ==
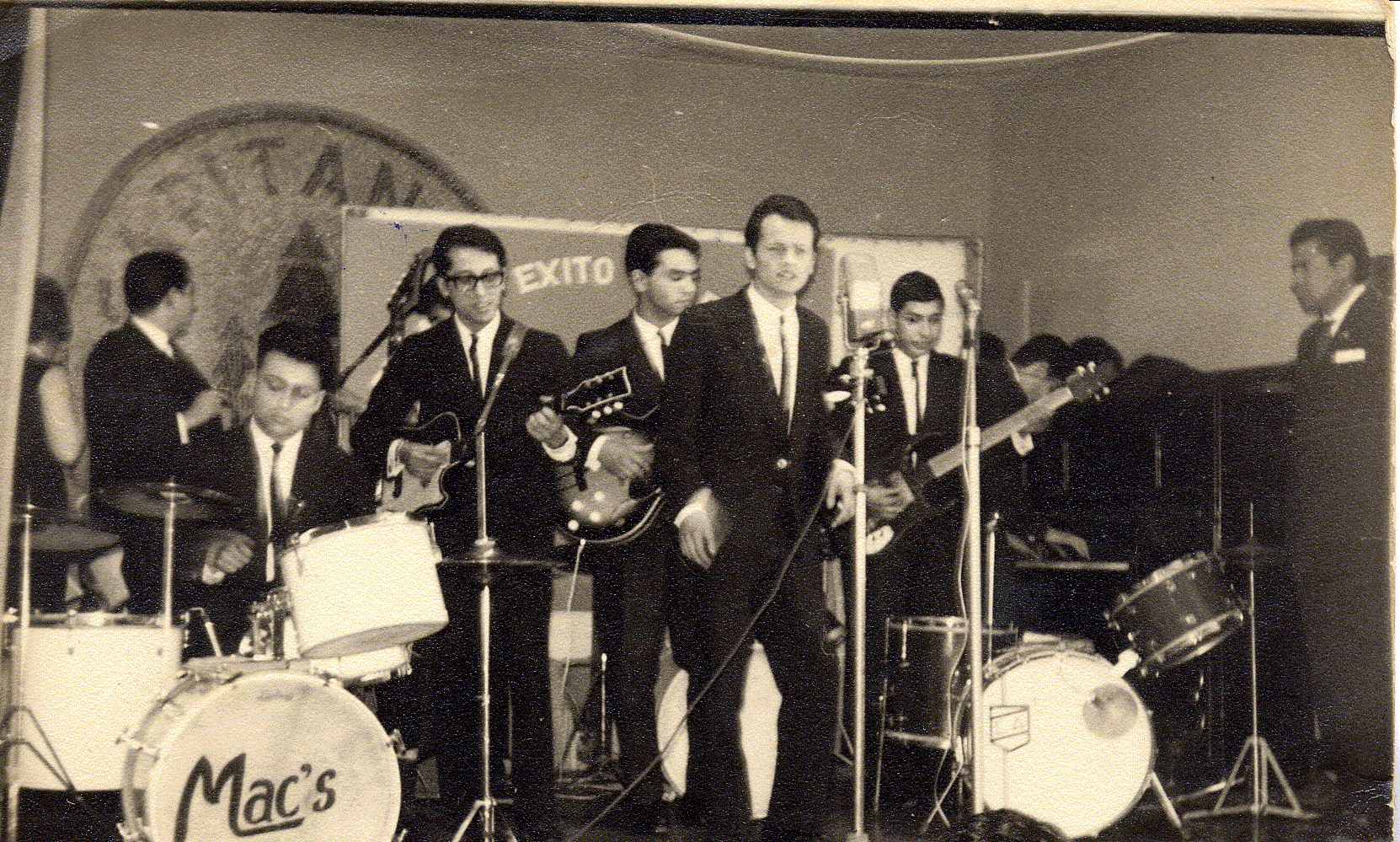
Los Mac's in 1962, one of the first authentic rock bands of Chile.

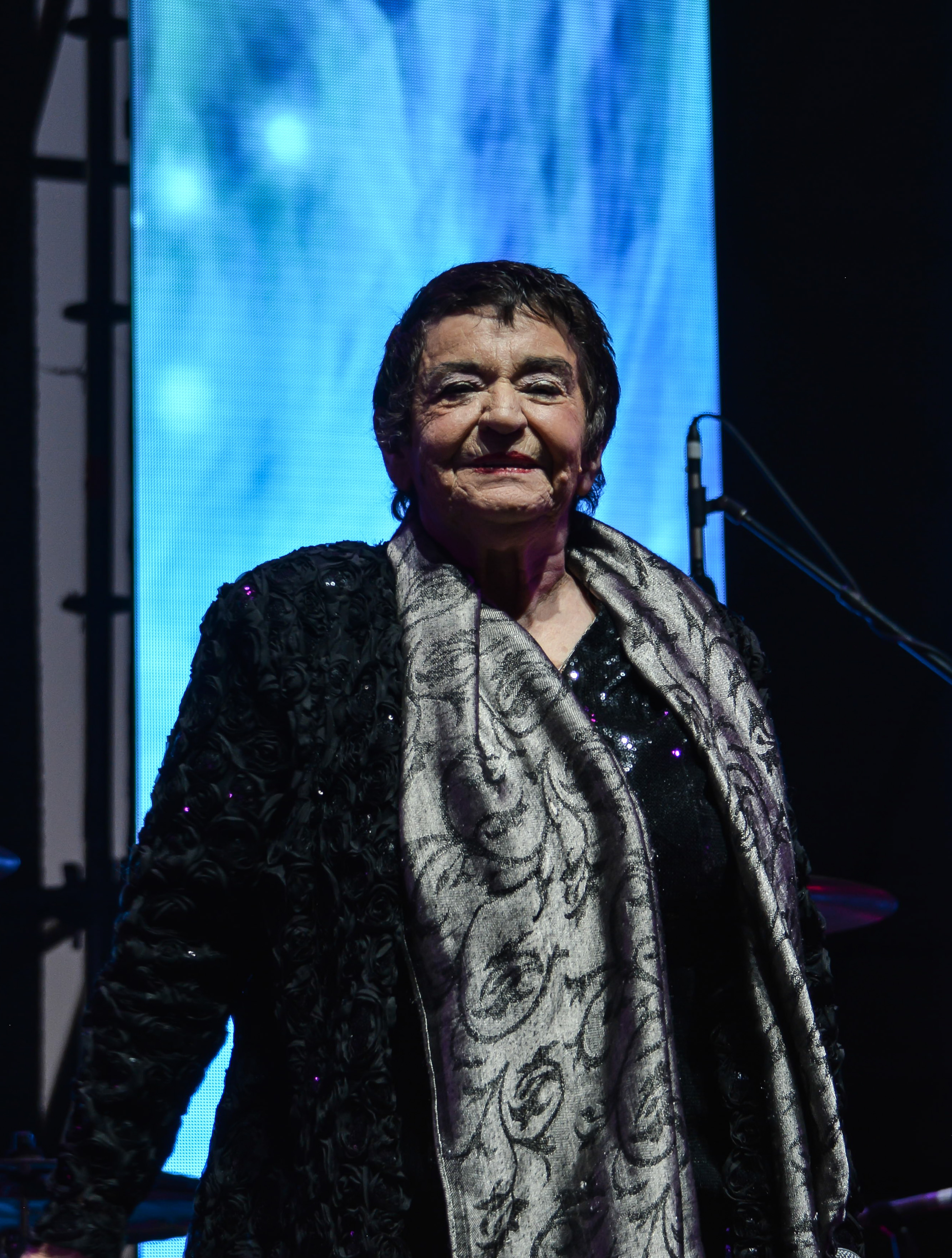
Cecilia Pantoja is considered the most influential artist of the Nueva ola movement in Chile.

Rock and roll originated in the United States in the late 1940s and 1950s and expanded rapidly around the world. In the late 1950s, the first Chilean rock and roll bands emerged, largely imitating popular North American bands and performing rock and roll songs they were already hits in the U.S. Some of the first Chilean rock and roll bands included William Reb y sus Rock Kings, Harry Shaw y Los Truenos, which performed versions of Elvis Presley tracks in 1956–57 and would later go on to record versions of Beatles songs. However, William Reb felt he never received the credit he deserved for his part in Chilean rock and roll.

Chile's first solo rock and roll artists were Peter Rock, with his Elvis Presley cover Baby, I Don't Care/Something Happened (1959), and Nadia Milton, with her single Scobidou/Un poco (1960).

The twist was also very popular in the 1950s, imported to Chile by the band Los Twisters with the singles Penas juveniles, Caprichitos, Me recordarás, Sueña and Mi secreto. In 1963, Los Twisters were voted the most popular band in Chile.

What began in the 1950s with imitations of American rock and roll soon developed into original music. La Orquesta Huambaly, with its roots in tropical music and jazz, were the first Chilean rock and roll band to compose original songs, including Huambaly rock (1957) and Rock del mono (Monkey Rock, 1958).

However, the first real commercial success story of the Nueva Ola scene was Los Ramblers, with their El Rock del Mundial (World Cup Rock) album released in May 1962 for the 1962 FIFA World Cup in Chile.

Los Ramblers opened the door to many other successful Nueva Ola artists. Some of the most well-known were: Peter Rock, Alan y sus Bates, Los Rockets, Buddy Richard, José Alfredo Fuentes, Antonio Prieto, Antonio Zabaleta, Cecilia Pantoja, Germán Casas, Ginette Acevedo, Gloria Benavides, Jorge Pedreros, Luis Dimas, Maitén Montenegro, Marcelo Hernández, Mirella Gilbert, Osvaldo Díaz, Germaín de la Fuente, Paolo Salvatore, Pat Henry, and Roberto Vicking Valdés. The Nueva Ola movement spread out of Santiago and throughout Chile, with bands like The New Demons forming in the northern city of Iquique, and The Blue Splendor, who formed – and still perform today – in Valparaíso.

The success of the Chilean Nueva Ola lasted until the mid-1960s, led by a second generation of musicians characterized by their original compositions, such as Buddy Richard, Patricio Renán, Los Ángeles Negros, José Alfredo Fuentes and Cecilia, considered by some critics as the greatest teen star of the mid-1960s.

The Nueva Ola has been criticized for foreignizing Chilean music because the style, lyrics and even names were heavily lifted from American and British culture. For some, the Nueva Ola movement is not considered the true origin of Chilean rock. They point instead to groups like Los Mac's, Los Jockers and Los Vidrios Quebrados, who modelled themselves more on bands like The Rolling Stones and The Beatles, and "were the first groupings who can really be identified as ‘rock made in Chile’, going further than the pop figures of the Nueva Ola." Bands that followed them were Los Picapiedras, Los Beat 4, Los Lark's and Los Sonny's one of the bands of future Florcita Motuda.

== Folk, Fusión Latinoamericana and psychedelic rock (1965–1973) ==
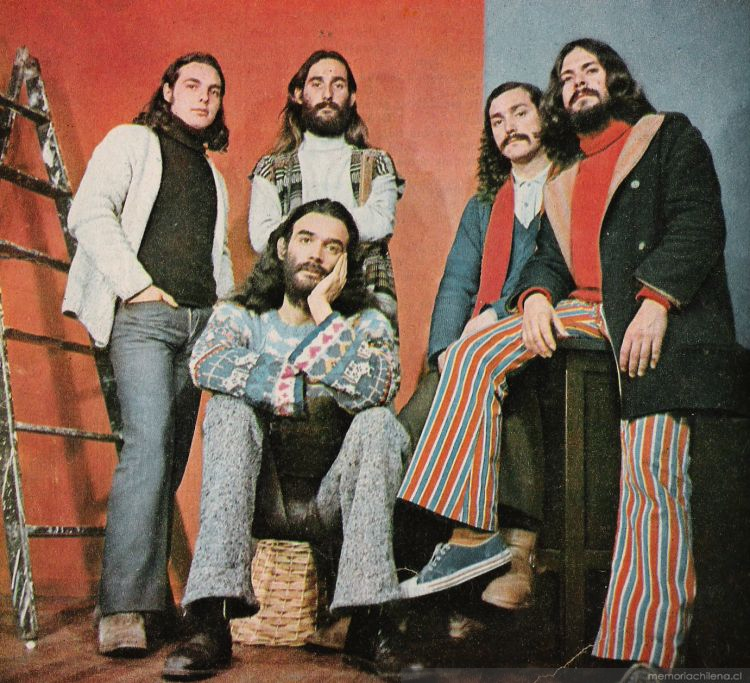
Los Jaivas are one of the most important rock bands in Chile, mixing latinamerican folk and progressive rock styles

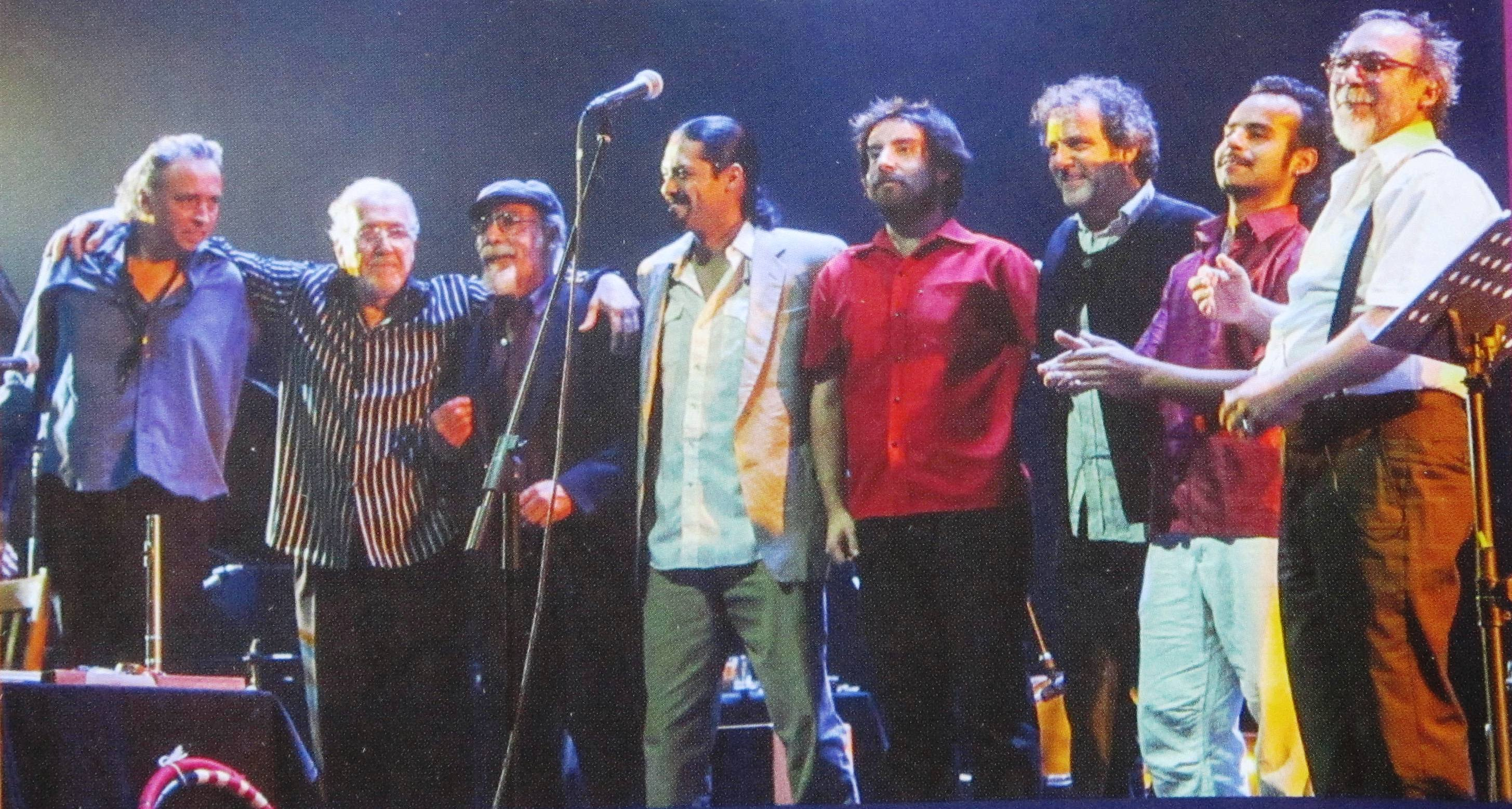
Congreso's style would evolve from folk rock, to progressive, jazz fusion and pop, establishing Fusion Latinoamericana as a Chilean music genre. In 2019 they celebrated their 50th anniversary

=== New chilean song ===
During the second half of the 1960s and early 1970s, after the strong American and British influences of the Nueva Ola, the Chilean rock movement began to return to the country's indigenous and Latin American sounds looking for his own identity. A neo-folk movement developed with the aim of recovering traditional Chilean folk music and merging it with Latin American rhythms such as andean music. This would have its fullest expression in the Nueva Canción Chilena (the New Chilean Song), which grew up in parallel to other nueva canción movements across Latin America.

The Nueva Canción Chilena was characterized by a rediscovery of the instruments and sounds of historic Latin American traditions, and in particular the work of the artists Violeta Parra and Víctor Jara. Despite being mainly acoustic, both Parra and Jara were extremely influential in the development of a new, socially aware folk culture, and rock culture as well, which looked beyond traditional peasants themes and drew in contemporary issues from across Chile and Latin America. They tried to represent the reality of life for working-class people, instead of the idealized portrait traditionally seen in older folk music.

=== Fusión Latinoamericana ===
After the singer-songwriter approach of the Nueva Canción, Los Jaivas would lead the movement to a more progressive rock style. Forming in 1963 in Viña del Mar, Los Jaivas mixed rock with South American ancestral music to form what became known as folk progressive rock or Fusión Latinoamericana. The 1981 album Alturas de Macchu Picchu (based on lyrics from The Heights of Macchu Picchu by Pablo Neruda) is considered a South American rock masterpiece. Congreso and Los Blops would follow this more elaborated way to make music and all three would be considered cornerstones in the definitive "Chilenization of Rock". Congreso would last more than 50 years creating new music and becoming an iconic Chilean band. En Busca del Tiempo Perdido, Congregación, Combo Xingú, Sol y Medianoche, Kissing Spell/Embrujo, Frutos del País and Panal made the rest of the scene. Their style would be later known as Fusión latinoamericana.

=== Psychedelic rock and Piedra Roja festival ===
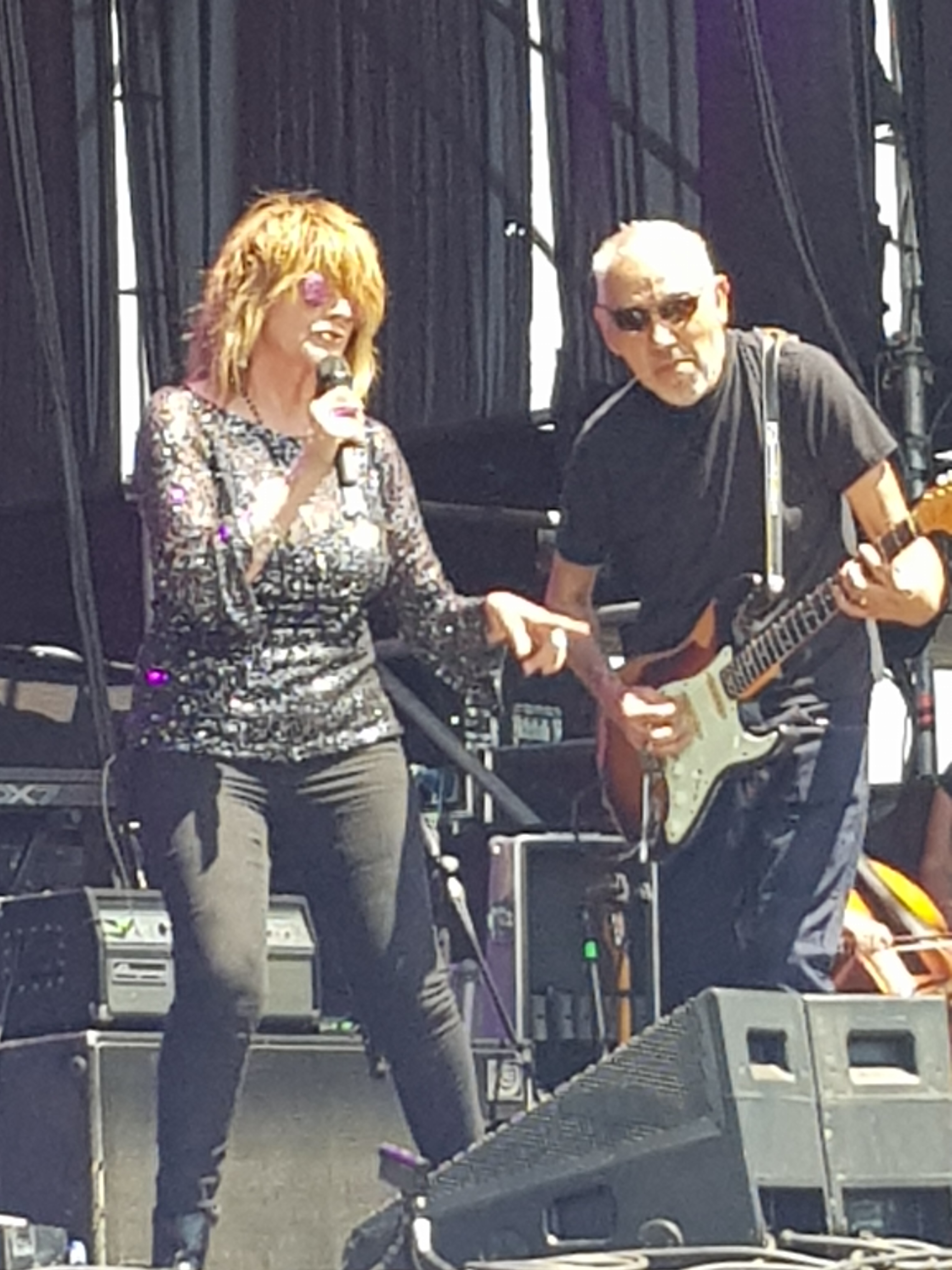
Denise and Carlos Corales from Aguaturbia representatives of Chilean psychedelic rock.

Psychedelic rock and blues rock came to Chile in the 1970s as it did elsewhere, influencing bands like Aguaturbia, Escombros and Sacros. Escombros contained former members of Los Mac's and Los Jockers and sung in English, producing covers of Jimi Hendrix and Led Zeppelin among others. Sacros have been compared to The Byrds and Bob Dylan, with traces of, and released their first album, Sacros, days before the 1973 military coup. The album is now a collector's item.

The famous Woodstock Festival in the U.S. inspired a similar event in Santiago, the Piedra Roja Festival of October 1970. The festival attracted many followers of the hippie movement and included performances by Los Blops and Los Jaivas, but poor organization led to a chaotic event which included sound problems and the presence of drugs and crime. The festival was, according to the National Digital Library of Chile, "the moment in which the youth subculture, represented by rock, became a public issue and was reported in the media as a latent social problem. Young people were shown as liberal, drug-taking, long-haired rebels who were affecting mainstream society."

Major music festivals of the time were Primer Encuentro de Música de Vanguardia (January 1970), Primer Festival de Rock Progresivo (October 1971) and Los Caminos Que Se Abren (February 1973). All three happened at Quinta Vergara (Viña del Mar).

== Underground scene during the dictatorship (1973–1989) ==
The proliferation of Chilean rock bands in the early 1970s ended with the military coup of 11 September 1973. The repressive military regime prohibited all manifestations of rock music, along with many other forms of culture (see Military government of Chile (1973–1990): cultural life). This brought about a decline of the music industry in Chile and a deterioration of the Chilean rock scene. Some Latin American fusion bands broke up, like Los Blop's, while others fled abroad, like Los Jaivas, who emigrated to Argentina. Others, like Congreso, were forced to radically change their music to a progressive rock style. By the late 1970s, an underground scene gradually began to emerge with punk rock, heavy metal, and later new wave music becoming increasingly popular.

=== Los Prisioneros ===
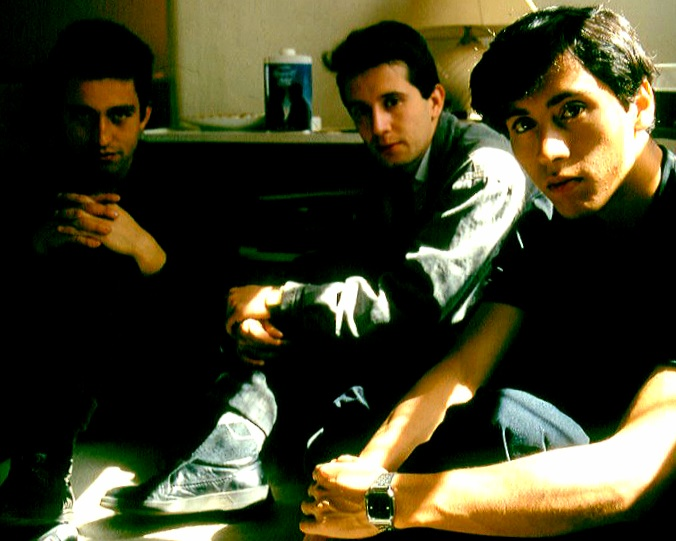
Los Prisioneros in 1987

However, one of the most well-known and influential bands since the 1980s, and from all history of Chilean rock, was Los Prisioneros, who were especially known for their outspoken songwriter and lead vocalist, Jorge González. The trio was also conformed by Claudio Narea on guitar and second voices, and Miguel Tapia on drums. Musically ranged from rockabilly, to reggae, ska, punk and later synth pop. Jorge Leiva of Musica Popular describes Los Prisioneros as "by far the most representative Chilean rock group. Their stripped-down rock, free from virtuoso pretensions, and their lyrics, full of acute social observation, were the voice of youth disenchantment during the dictatorship of Augusto Pinochet." Their albums La voz de los '80, Pateando piedras and Corazones are considered among the best of Chilean popular musical history. On 1 October 1993 MTV's Latin Channel (MTV Latino) debuted and they chose as their first video broadcast the Los Prisioneros music video We are sudamerican rockers.

=== Punk and Hardcore ===
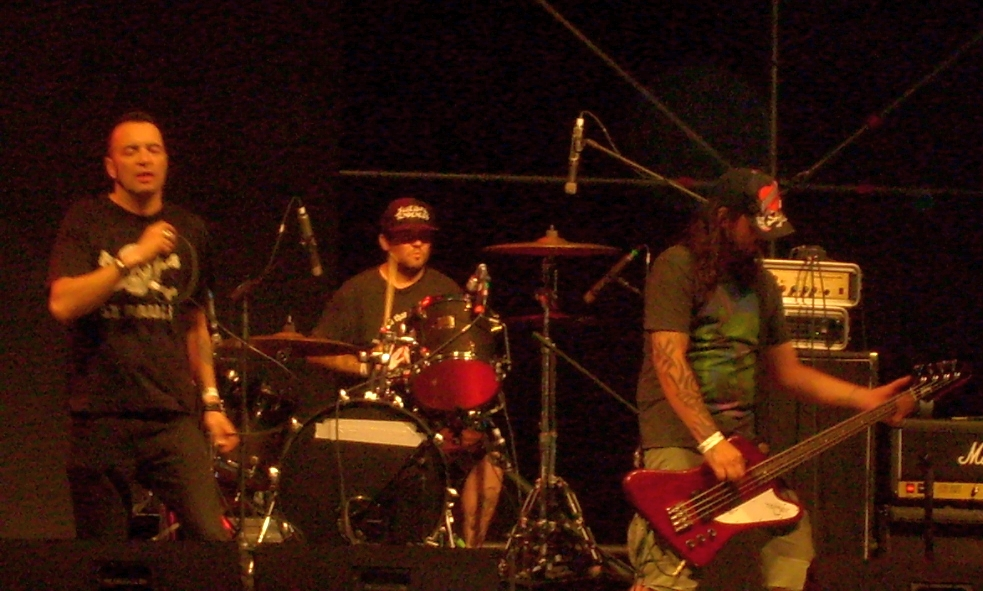
Fiskales Ad-Hok a prominent punk band still active since 1986

Chile's first contribution to punk rock can be found abroad. In the mid-1970s Álvaro Peña-Rojas, better known as "The Chilean with the Singing Nose", joined Joe Strummer in the band The 101'ers, one of the world's first punk bands and a precursor to the legendary band The Clash. From 1985, the first local punk bands began to play in union headquarters around Santiago, such as El Trolley, named after the trolleybus workers’ union, and a cab-drivers’ union in El Aguilucho in Ñuñoa, Santiago. These saw performances from punk bands the Pinochet Boys, Zapatilla Rota, and Dadá, among others. The first Chilean punk festival took place in El Garage Internacional de Matucana with Fiskales Ad-Hok, Ocho Bolas, Politikos Muertos and Vandalik among others. Jordi Berenguer writes: “they were clandestine and illegal spaces. It was the last years of the dictatorship. If there was now less to fear, the death and repression still continued.” In the following years, stand out punk bands would include Los Peores de Chile, Bbs Paranoicos, Los Miserables, Machuca, Parkinson and post punk band Pánico. The hardcore punk bands would be Los Morton, Anarkía, Caos, Los KK, Belial and DTH. Pop punk bands of the late 1990s were Tronic, Gufi, or Los Mox!. Pegotes and Familea Miranda were able to take back punk to his original ideology. Horror punk was made by Letifer, Don Zata, Q.E.P.D or Voodoo Zombie.

=== Heavy and Thrash Metal ===
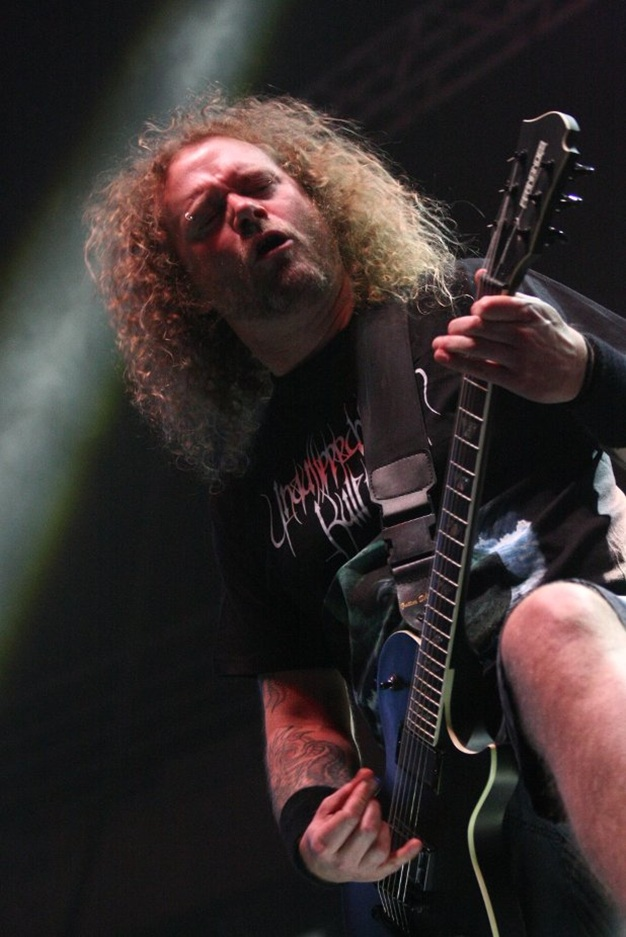
Anton Reisenegger, leader of Criminal and Pentagram Chile.

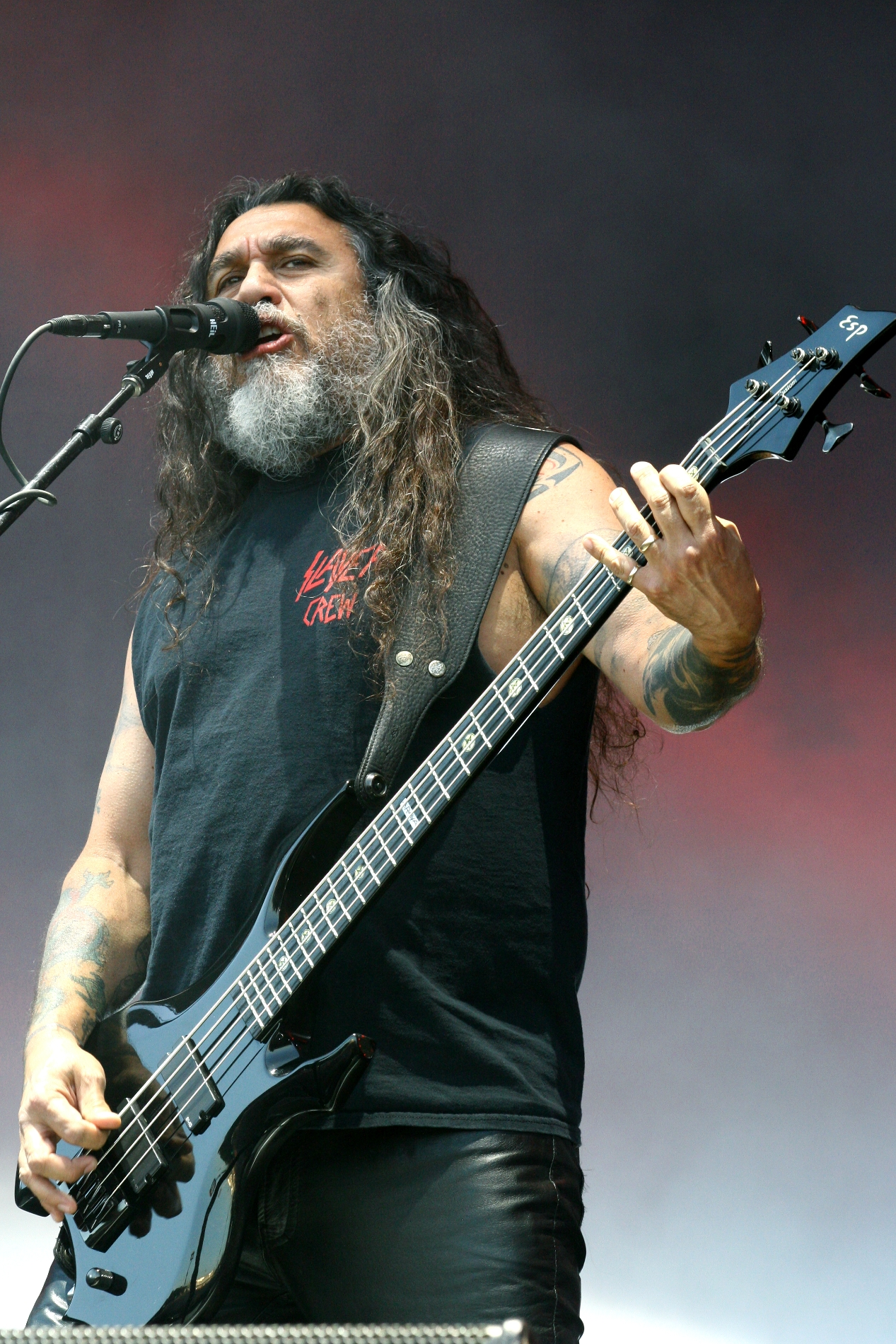
Tom Araya is the most influential metal artist of Chile, as Slayer vocalist and bassist

In the later 1970s and 1980s, a heavy metal scene developed that was highly clandestine despite having no overt political affiliation or outward opposition to General Augusto Pinochet and his ongoing military regime. Bands of this generation included Pentagram Chile, Dorso, Massakre, Necrosis, Panzer and Rust. Tom Araya would become the biggest metal figure as the lead vocalist and bassist of Slayer, after his family emigrated to the United States. During the late 1980s, with the dictatorship coming to an end, bands such as Squad, Massakre, Necrosis, Pentagram Chile and Criminal become well known in Chile and even at an international level. In contrast to punk, thrash metal had its origin in Santiago's upper-class neighborhoods and was less involved with politics, although the lyrics of bands like Necrosis showed an interest in the political situation. Many other bands would leave his trail such as Turbo, Callejón Oscuro, Arrecife, Ekkos, Panchorrata in addition to other thrash metal bands such as SQVAD, SxNxFx (Sex No Future), Cancerbero, Atomic Aggressor Vastator and Bloody Cross, a black metal band formed in 1986.

At the turn of the decade, and as the dictatorship came to an end, more Chilean metal bands emerged, including Six Magics, Slavery, Torturer, Bismarck, Dracma and Inquisición. Progressive metal bands such as Alejandro Silva power cuarteto, Coprofago, Crisálida, Horeja, Matraz or Delta, were also notable. Tumulto, Arena Movediza and Millantún were between heavy metal and hard rock styles. The heyday of the Nu metal genre also expanded to Chile, generating a much more aggressive, raw and less commercial variant that was locally known as "Aggro Metal". Since the beginning of the new millennium several bands, like 2X, Rekiem and Rey Chocolate, got considerable airplay on MTV and also participated in annual festivals until the mid-2000s, when Aggro Metal started to lose its past relevance and most of the bands split up or migrated to other styles.

A study made in 2018 confirms that Chile is the country with most metal bands per capita in Latin America doubling Argentina and the rest by far.

=== New Wave and Post Punk ===
Others groups of this decade were heavily influenced by electronic music, new wave music, as well as Argentine rock and pop. Acts such as Aparato Raro, Upa!, Banda 69, Emociones Clandestinas and Electrodomésticos in addition to the last stages of Los Prisioneros, were pioneers of indie and synth pop of modern days, and earned a significant amount of success.

=== Fusion and Progressive ===
Heirs of the Fusion latinoamericana of the early '70s, under the Pinochet regime new bands emerged that emphasized influences other than folk, such as contemporary classical music, jazz, metal, world music, or experimental music, away from the massive public but acclaimed by the circuits of connoisseurs, despite often struggling to record. Congreso and Los Jaivas would continue to lead the way in the next decades however many creatives progressive and fusion rock ensembles would rise such as Almandina, Kalish and Grace of King in the mid '70s. The jazz vibraphonist and classical conductor Guillermo Rifo was the founder of three important bands, Aquila, where he melds latin rhythms with electric ensemble, later form the Sexteto Hindemith 76, where he merged jazz, academic music and folk, and Latinomusicaviva where chamber music, jazz improvisation and rhythm merge of rock. Other bands were Santa y su gente, Miel, the first to use a synthesizer, and Kámara. Formed in 1972, Fusión is historically considered the first Chilean jazz-rock project, using electric instrumentation, experimented on rhythmic patterns of soul, funk and rock, but maintaining intact the impulse of the primitive jazz improvisation. Shortly after, Pizarro (founder of Fusión) released as soloist and later he would found in Europe, Tamarugo and Skuas, with influences of classical music, jazz and latin. In the '80s other significant bands were Tercera Generación, Quilín, Evolución, La Banda del Gnomo, Bandhada, Amapola, Ernesto Holman (previously bassist in Congreso), Ensamble, La Hebra, Cometa, AlSur and Huara. A singular case of underground resistance was Fulano, inspired in the Rock in Opposition movement, had a virtuoso Zappa-like jazz-rock style, with a punk attitude and witty lyrics, that would influence on modern avant-garde rock bands such as Akinetón Retard and Mediabanda. Once back in democracy new outstanding bands were formed such as La Marraqueta, Tryo, Matraz, Ergosum, Entrama, Akinetón Retard, Exsimio, Dwalin, Entrance, La Neura, Mediabanda (with their remarkable debut album in 2003 entitled Entre la Inseguridad y el Ego), Subterra, Mar de Robles, Primavera Negra, Astralis, Nubosidad Parcial and Fractal.

== Diversification and Internationalization (1990–2004) ==
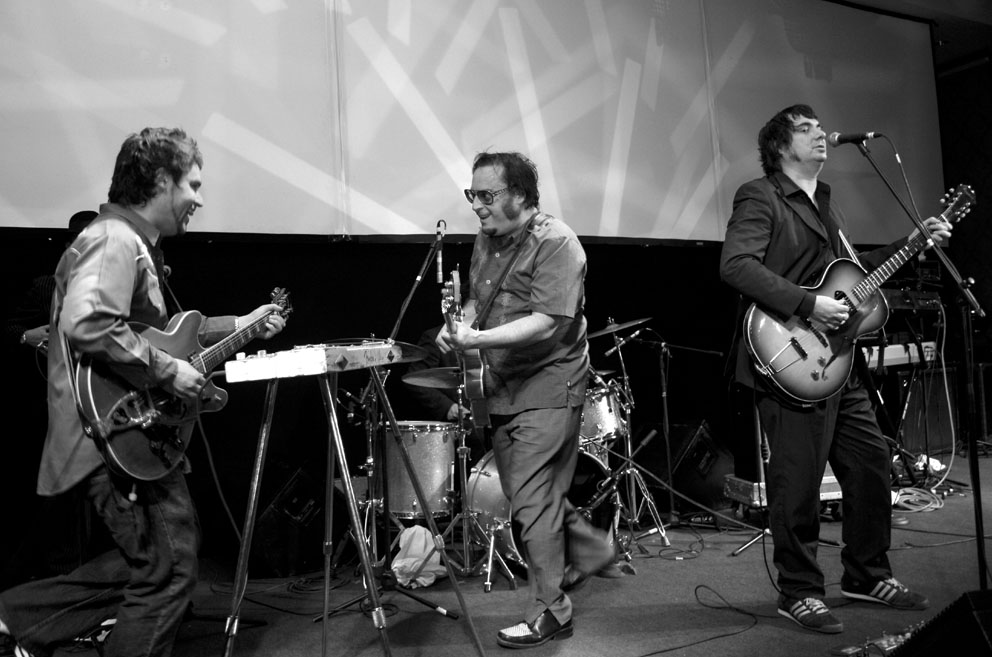
Los Tres, the most important band of the 1990s.

In the 1990s, Chilean rock was characterized by a diversification of styles derived from rock and pop, as well as a greater exposure to the international market. This was due in part to the return of democracy and an end to the repression of cultural activities, as well as an increase in contact between the Chilean population and the rest of the world as a result of economic liberalization. Thus, Alternative rock and Pop rock were the most common styles, among an increasingly wider range of subgenres.

=== Los Tres ===
The leading Chilean rock band of the 1990s were Los Tres, who mixed styles like rock (from rockabilly to grunge), jazz and cueca (Chile's folkloric national dance) and became particularly successful in Mexico, The albums Los Tres (1991), La Espada & la Pared (1995) and Fome (1997) are considered among the most influential albums of rock en español according to Rolling Stone Magazine and Culto Magazine from La Tercera. Besides an MTV Unplugged in (1995) which was one of the most laureate unplugged of the MTV Latino era. They became the iconic rock band of the Chilean transition to democracy. The band took musical quality to a new level in Chile with its instrumental development of rock, thanks in part to versatile guitarist Ángel Parra, grandson of Violeta Parra, and leader of his own latin jazz band called Ángel Parra Trío. Álvaro Henríquez, lead singer and second guitarist, was previously known as the musician of La negra Ester, a very influential musical theater play (based on the poetry book written in décimas by Roberto Parra Sandoval and directed by Andrés Pérez). He also led Los Pettinellis, during Los Tres hiatus, who had a short but successful career from 2001 to 2004 before splitting up, not long after also performing in the Viña del Mar International Song Festival. In addition to a homonymous solo album in 2005. The rest of the band was composed by bassist Roberto Lindl and drummer Francisco Molina, who left the band in 2000 to start a jazz career in the United States after his experience in Chile with Los Titulares. Henríquez would become the third major rock star of Chile, after Gato Alquinta from Los Jaivas, and Jorge González from Los Prisioneros, due to his outstanding career with Los Tres.

=== Pop Rock ===
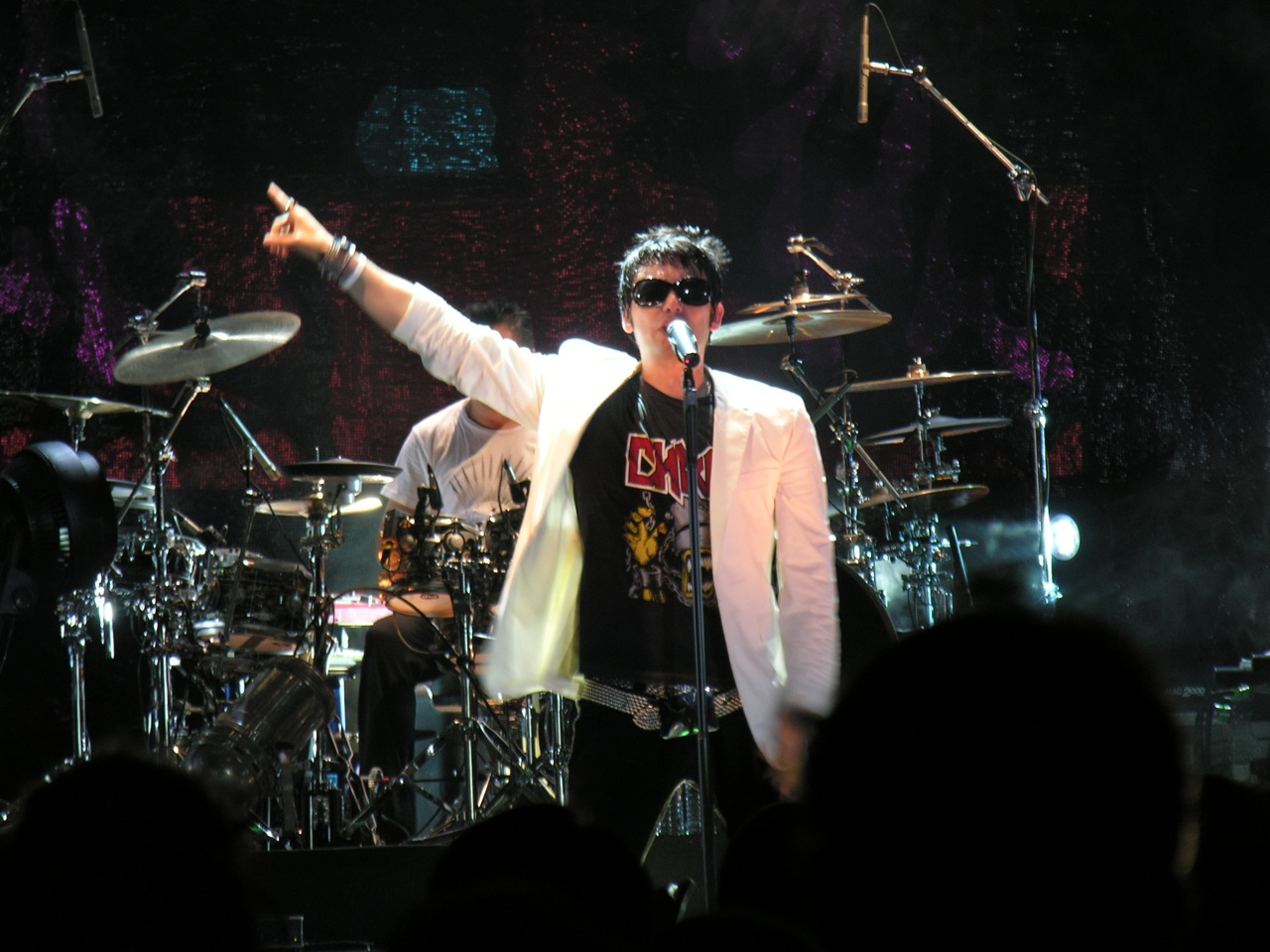
Beto Cuevas and La Ley, became the most important pop rock band of the 1990s, and the most awarded

La Ley (Spanish for "The Law"), also had a very successful career in Mexico and other Spanish-speaking countries and won a Grammy Award, two Latin Grammy Awards and an MTV Video Music Award. After a failed first album, Desiertos (1990), they released Doble Opuesto (1991), which appears as the official first album of the band. Singles like "Desiertos," "Tejedores de Ilusión," and "Prisioneros de la Piel" made them stars in Chile, Argentina and Mexico, especially after the release of La Ley, their second recording (1993). After Andrés Bobe's death in 1994 (guitars, vocals), La Ley continued with a new guitarist, Pedro Frugone, and released two more albums; in 1995, the band released Invisible, the album was their international breakout record and provided to the band their best-selling studio album to date, it included the number ones "Dia Cero" and "El Duelo".

Other key 1990s bands included: Lucybell, whose popularity expanded during the decade throughout Chile and the rest of the continent, and more closely related to alternative rock. Javiera y Los Imposibles, whose lead singer Javiera Parra is also member of the Parra family, and Nicole who became the first female rock pop solo artist to gain international recognition, were also very popular. During the first half of the 2000s, Javiera y Los Imposibles, whose 2001 album AM was performed at the prestigious Viña del Mar International Song Festival in 2002, became widely popular. Saiko also formed in the late 1990s (1999) and, made up of former members of La Ley and the singer Denisse Malebrán, found recognition during the first half of the 2000s. La Rue Morgue would be a good example of jazzy pop rock music with good mainstream acceptance. Sexual Democracia was a regional band from Valdivia that reached popularity in Santiago. Other alternative pop rock bands were Elso Tumbay, Golem, Ludwig Band and Profetas y Frenéticos from Claudio Narea. Aleste and Sol Azul were the iconics one-hit wonder of 1990s pop. Teen pop was led by Supernova and Stereo 3, and in the 2000s by emo pop band Kudai.

=== Funk and Soul ===
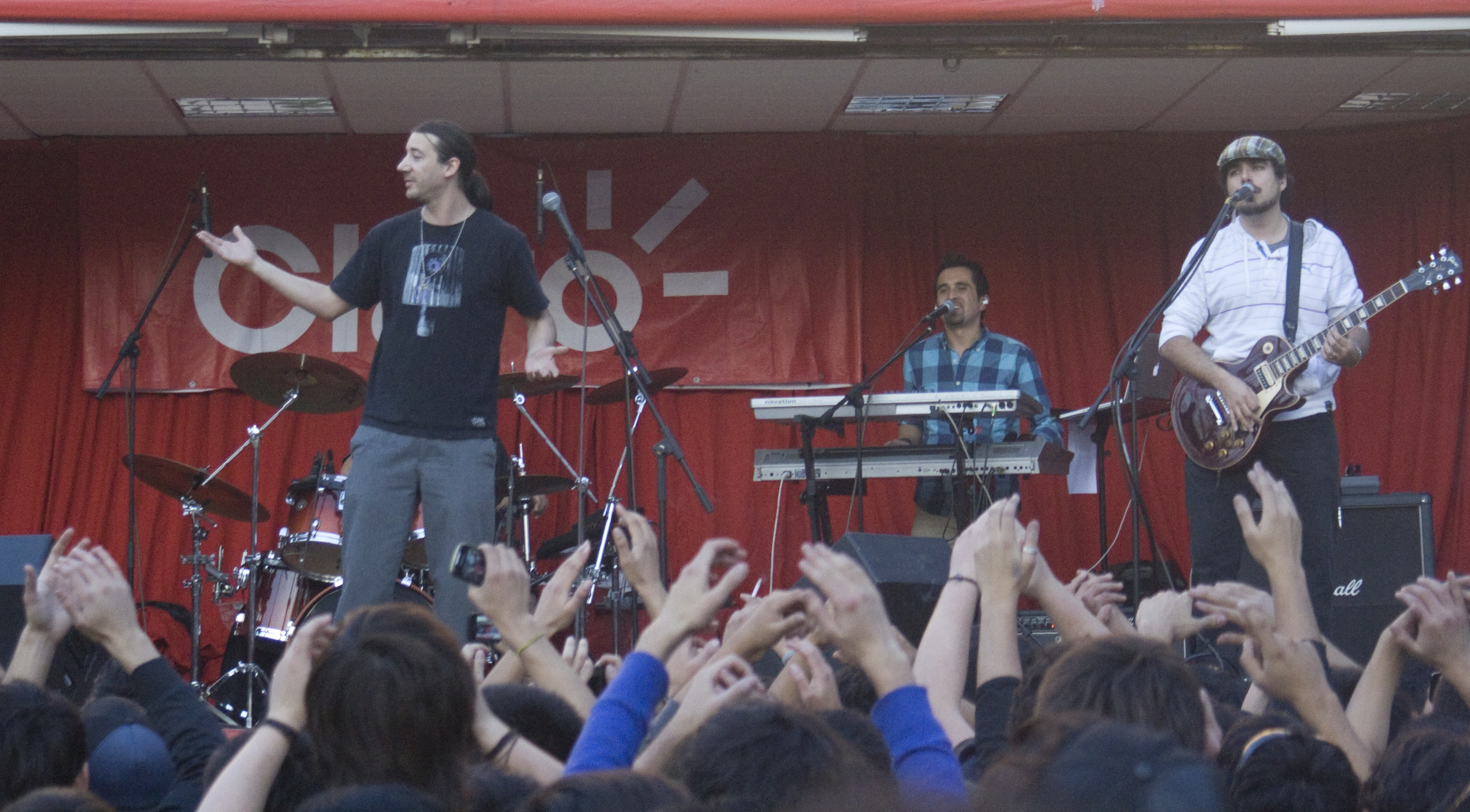
Los Tetas were the most successful and representative funk band, alongside Chancho en Piedra

Even though the history of funk in Chile goes back to the late 1960s and Los Minimás, it was not until the 1990s that funk became widely popular. The first band to create a purely funk album in Chile was Los Morton, who formed in 1990 and released their debut album, "Santo Remedio", in 1993. Their funk sometimes incorporated other styles such as rap and Hardcore, with other bands like Supersordo sharing this kind of sound. In 1995 Los Tetas, released their debut album entitled Mama Funk, combining rock, funk, soul and hip hop. Los Tetas’ first single, "Corazón de Sandía" (Watermelon Heart), was a summer hit on the local radio stations and their first two albums Mama Funk (1995) and La Medicina (1998), went on to be released and performed in several other Latin American countries. Between these two major works, they collaborated in the 1997 album of Tiro de Gracia "Ser humano!!" (Human being), which is considered the sixth best album in the history of Chile according to Rolling Stone Magazine.

In 1995, the successful band Chancho en Piedra emerged with their debut album "Peor es mascar lauchas" (It's Worse To Chew Mice). Their style has been compared to the Red Hot Chili Peppers but they are also known for their unique funk/rock sound, goofy style, and their socially and politically aware lyrics. Their success continued with Ríndanse terrícolas (Surrender earthlings) (1998) and Marca Chancho (Pig brand) (2000). As of 2020, they have released 11 albums. Other funk bands emerging in this decade included Papanegro, Matahari, Raiza, Mamma Soul, Solo di Medina, or Cholomandinga in a mix of Latin rhythms and funk. La Pozze Latina, Makiza, De Kiruza, and Tiro de Gracia, made the rap funk scene, in the Chilean hip hop boom of the late 1990s. The electronic scene was led by DJ Raff and DJ Bitman. After the Los Tetas' hiatus in 2004, his members would have solo projects. C-Funk made a solo career in the United States and joined Chancho en Piedra as a guitarist in 2019. Tea-Time would found Funk Attack together with Rulo (who also founded Esencia) and both would have a solo career as well before they all reunited in 2011.

=== Grunge ===
As in the rest of the world, the grunge bands of Seattle had a great impact on Chilean youth in the beginning of the 1990s, and the decade saw the emergence of Chilean grunge bands like Jusolis, Mandrácula, Los Ex, Blu Toi and Duna. These last two produced their first albums independently, though Blu Toi's album was distributed by Warner Bros. The influence of the grunge sound can also be seen in bands like Los Tres, Yajaira and Weichafe.

=== Reggae ===
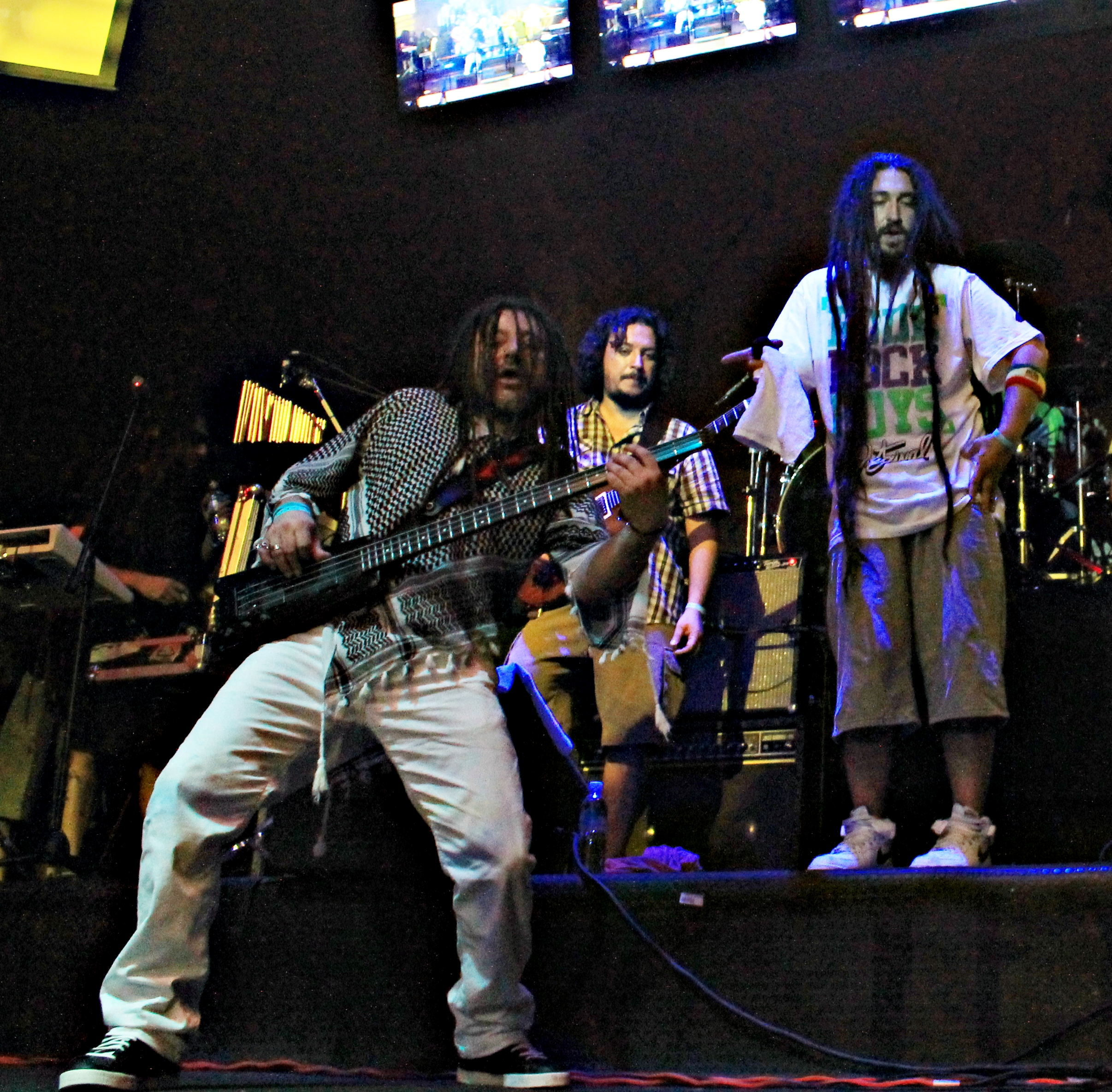
Gondwana became the most popular reggae band of Chile

One of the first bands to play reggae in Chile, despite reggae not being their main influence, was Sol y Lluvia, founded in 1976 and still active today. Sol y Lluvia also had strong ties to the Nueva Canción Chilena and later to alternative rock. Los prisioneros were also pioneers in reggae and ska during the 1980s. However Gondwana, founded in 1987, are today considered the most successful Chilean reggae band. Produced by the well-known Doctor Dread of RAS Records, Gondwana found success in Chile and abroad and performed in both Jamaica and the United States as well as his lead singer Quique Neira since he began his solo career in 2003. Another exponent of Chilean reggae in the 1990s was La Floripondio, who mixed reggae with cumbia, ska, and rock, similar to Joe Vasconcellos.

=== Chilean "Brit" Pop ===
In the second half of the 1990s a new wave of Chilean bands appeared, influenced mainly by the alternative rock and Britpop scenes that spread around the world. These included bands like Glup! who were heavily influenced by Blur, and reached great deal of mainstream success thanks to their hit single Freebola of the album 1999 released the same year. Other importants bands were Canal Magdalena, Solar, and Santos Dumont, all of whom became popular with Chilean Britpop fans.

=== Latin Rock ===
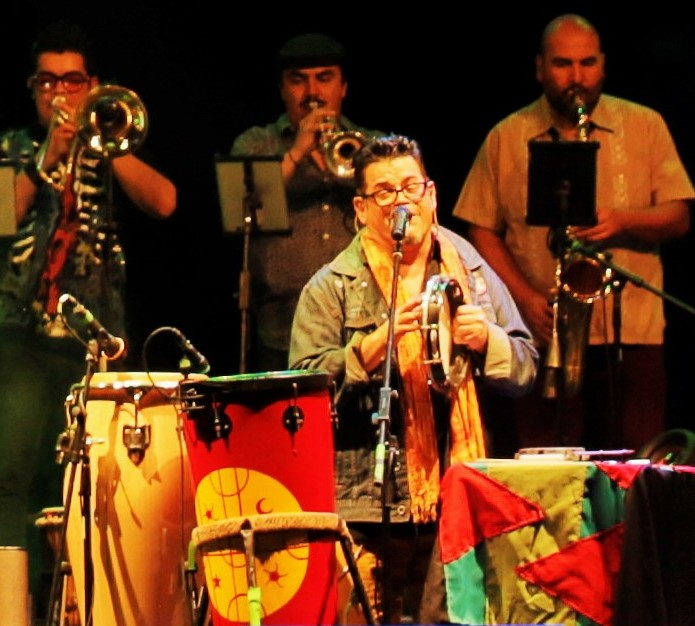
Joe Vasconcellos is noted as the main driver in the fusion of rock with Latin rhythms, such as the New Chilean cumbia

A prominent and special case was Joe Vasconcellos, who had worked as lead singer in Congreso between 1980 and 1984. Since the late 1980s, he developed a solo career that in the 1990s reached his peak. His style combines rock, blues, cumbia, Brazilian music, and other Latin rhythms, often with big percussion and brass sections. His albums Toque (1995), and Vivo (1999) were major hits, and would influence on next generations of Latin percussion-based rock artists, such as Chico Trujillo and the New Chilean cumbia movement. Other bands in this kind of fusion would be Santo Barrio, Cholomandinga, and La Floripondio.

=== Blues Rock ===
The origins of blues in Chile are uncertain, although Aguaturbia was a benchmark in this style, as were Los Jaivas in their songs such as "Canción del gancho", there is no more concrete background. The song "O'Riley" by Destruction Mac's can be taken as a reference, which applies a harmonica with bluish touches, although the music of this band is clearly inspired by groups of hard rock like Mountain. Although there was a small revival in the 1980s with Mauricio Redolés, it was not until the 1990s that groups such as El Cruce and La Banda del Capitán Corneta that a blues of Creole dyes spread in Chile, the first two decades of the 21st century stood out Perrosky, Julius Popper, Zapatillas Social Blues, La Rompehueso and La Rata Bluesera.

== Digital era, commercial decline and future (2005–present) ==
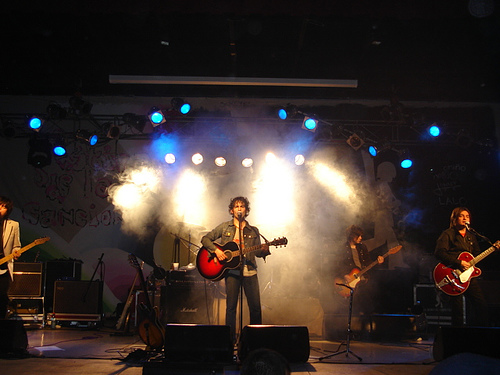
Los Bunkers

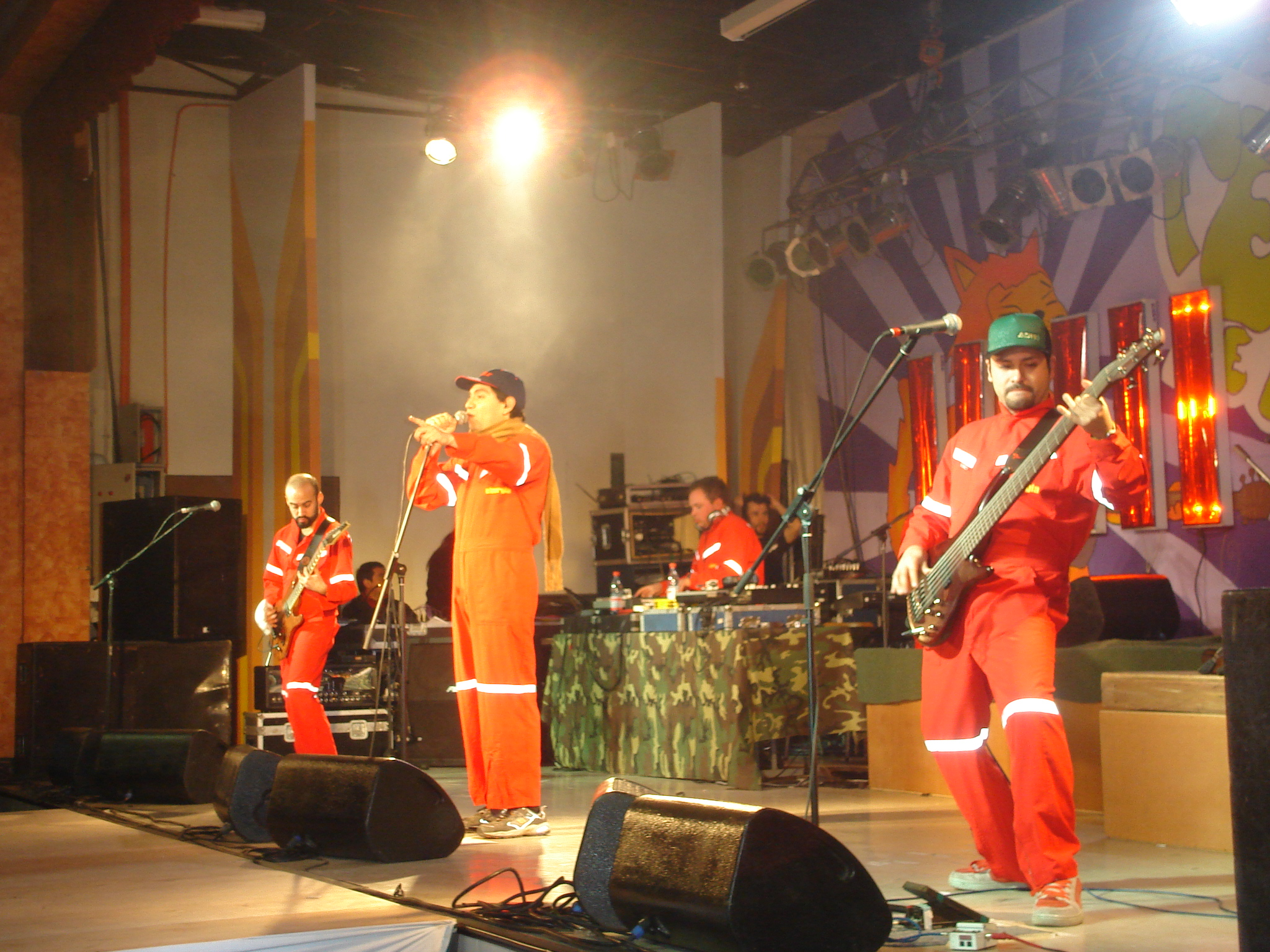
Sinergia mixes Nu metal with humorous lyrics of Chilean mundane life.

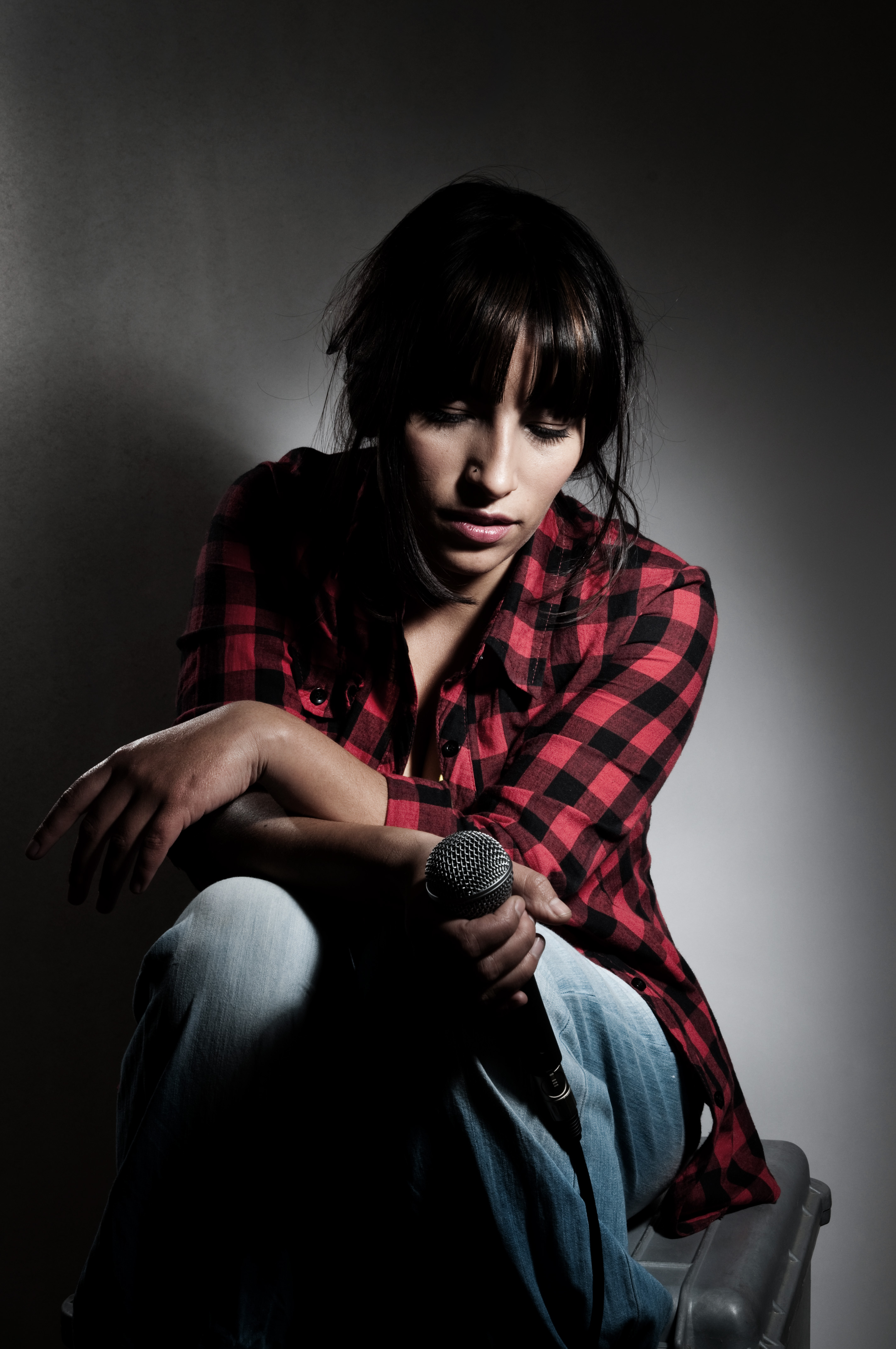
Ana Tijoux and later Mon Laferte are two of the more internationally successful female artist of the new generation

These years have seen a consolidation of the previous successes of Chilean rock-pop in the international market, while the older artists are now considered cultural icons. During the 2010s, rock music in general saw a decline in mainstream popularity and chilean rock was not an exception, however a new generation of musicians began to appear, mostly independent and difficult to classify due to the increasing fusion of sub-genres. Folk rock and synth pop are genres that have been successfully reinvented, while an ever-present hard rock scene continues among fan niches.

In the second half of the 2000s, one of the best-known Chilean rock bands was Los Bunkers, an alternative rock group from Concepción, Chile, who formed in 1999. With their contemporary rock sound, influenced by 1960s rock and folk sounds, the band has achieved international success with the album Vida de perros (Dog's Life) and performed at the Vive Latino festival in Mexico City in 2006 and 2007. Also from Concepción are the band De Saloon, forming in 2003. Other notable band of this period included Sinergia, with a mix of nu metal and Comedy rock with humorous lyrics of daily and mundane Chilean topics, winning fans outside the rock scene.

=== Emergence of indie, acoustic, synthpop and rock-pop ===
Several Chilean artists – including Anita Tijoux (previously known as lead singer in hip hop band Makiza), Mon Laferte, Francisca Valenzuela, Álex Anwandter, Gepe, Javiera Mena, Pedropiedra, Camila Gallardo, Denise Rosenthal, María Colores, Teleradio Donoso, Ases Falsos, Planeta No, Astro, Primavera de Praga, Difuntos Correa, Niños del Cerro, and Dënver, among others – gain international praise and recognition, especially in the Spanish press, with El País calling Chile a "new pop paradise". Alongside with the electronic aesthetics, a new generation of mostly acoustic singer-songwriters, and world music inspired musicians had an important presence in stages and media. Manuel García (previously known as leader of Mecánica Popular), Nano Stern, Chinoy, Camila Moreno, Pascuala Ilabaca, Fernando Milagros, Paz Court, Evelyn Cornejo, Paz Quintana, Natalia Contesse are some of them.

=== Hard Rock highlights ===
Among the most celebrated new rock bands of the 2010s decade were Kuervos del Sur, Rama, Tenemos Explosivos, Alectrofobia, Matorral, Cómo asesinar a Felipes (fusing alternative hip hop and jazz with rock) Weichafe, Adelaida, Angelo Pierattini and Cler Canifrú. Kuervos del Sur are considered heirs of Los Jaivas in making rock with latinamerican instruments and rhythms, but with a harder sound, close to post-grunge. They won a Pulsar Award for best rock album in 2017 for El Vuelo del Pillán.

=== Festivals ===
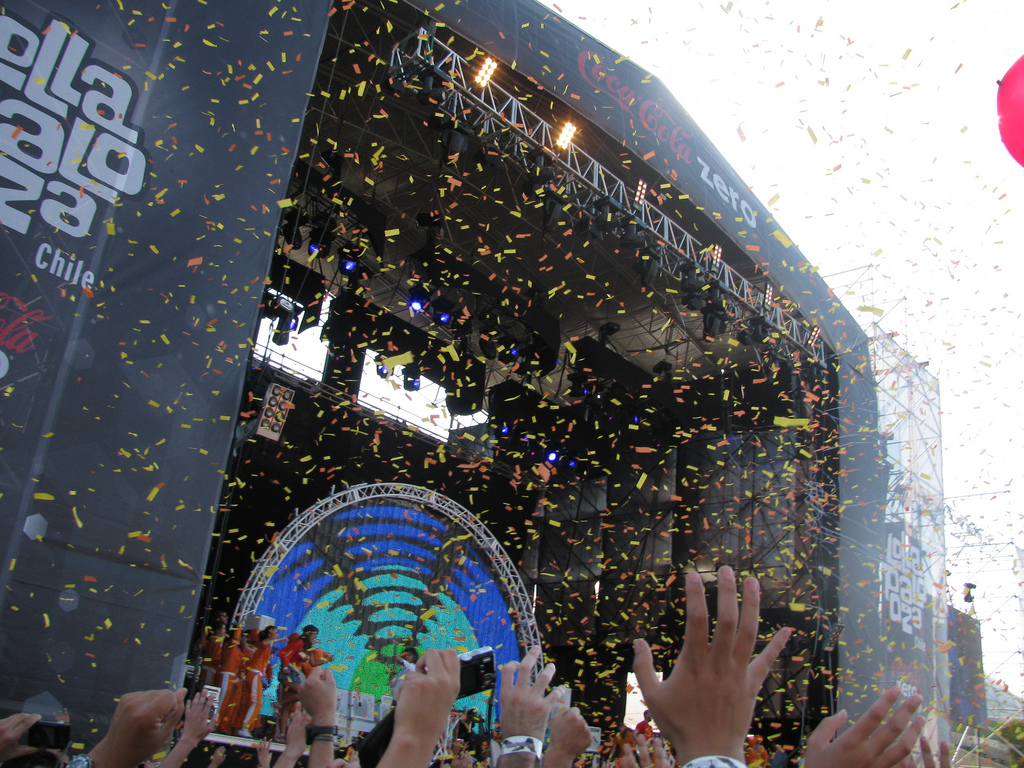
The Flaming Lips – Lollapalooza Chile 2011

In the 2010 "Festival El Abrazo" (The Hug Festival), held in Santiago to celebrate 200 years of independence for both Chile and Argentina, Chilean heavyweights Los Jaivas and Los Tres were joined by Argentinean artists like Charly García and Fito Páez, among others. Meanwhile, Los Bunkers were, in 2011, the first Chilean band to play Coachella in the United States. In April 2011, Chile hosted Lollapalooza Chile, the first of the Lollapalooza festivals to be held outside the United States. Its success was such that it returned again from 2012 to 2019 and attracted international artists like The Killers, Kanye West, Foo Fighters, Arctic Monkeys and hundreds of other big names. Chilean acts like Los Bunkers, Chico Trujillo and Anita Tijoux have also performed at the Chicago version of Lollapalooza. Another big festival was La Cumbre del Rock Chileno (The heights of Chilean rock) being held in 2007, 2009, 2012, 2013, 2017 and 2018. Hundreds of Chilean bands performed, included major artist as well as emerging ones.

In 2012 and 2013, a festival called Metal Fest featured local metal bands with international artists such as Anthrax, The Misfits and Blind Guardian.

Other festivals are Rock en Conce (Also known as REC), held since 2015 in Concepción, Rockódromo and Rock Carnaza in Valparaíso, Fluvial in Valdivia, Woodstaco in Maule Region and Chiloé Metal Fest in Chiloé Archipelago.
