= Love, Peace & Poetry – Vol.10 Chilean =

Love, Peace & Poetry: Chilean Psychedelic Music

Compilation album by Various artists
- Released: November 22, 2008
- Genre: Psychedelic rock
- Label: QDK Media; Normal

Love, Peace & Poetry chronology
Love, Peace & Poetry – Vol.9 Turkish (2005)	Love, Peace & Poetry: Chilean Psychedelic Music (2008)

Professional ratings
Review scores
Source	Rating
Dusted Magazine	(mixed) link
Orlando Weekly	(positive) link
PopMatters	link

Love, Peace & Poetry – Vol.10 Chilean is the tenth volume in the Love, Peace & Poetry series released by QDK Media and Normal Records in 2008. This volume explores obscure garage rock and psychedelic rock bands from Chile.

== Track listing ==
1. "Yellow Moon" (Kissing Spell) – 2:17
2. "Foto de Primera Comunión" (Los Jaivas) – 6:30
3. "Primavera de Miss L.O'B." (Los Vidrios Quebrados) – 2:33
4. "Erótica" (Aguaturbia) – 3:49
5. "Momentos" (Blops) – 2:54
6. "Realidad" (Sacros) – 3:58
7. "La Muerte de Mi Hermano" (Los Mac's) – 2:34
8. "Pisándose La Cola" (Blops) – 6:44
9. "Canto Sin Nombre" (Embrujo) – 4:37
10. "Pobre Gato" (Los Beat 4) – 2:02
11. "I Wonder Who" (Aguaturbia) – 2:56
12. "Tu, Yo y Nuestro Amor" (Tumulto) – 4:18
13. "Pirómano" (Blops) – 5:35
14. "Magnetism" (Escombros – 2:45
15. "Civilización" (Los Beat 4) – 2:17
16. "Cuantos Que No Tienen y Merecen" (Congregacion) – 3:28
17. "Así Serás" (El Congreso) – 3:40
