= Phono =

Phono may refer to:

- Phone (phonetics), speech sound, gesture or segment
- Phonograph, regularly abbreviated to phono on buttons and jacks of audio equipment
- RCA connector, called "phono" since they originally connected to phonographs
- Phono (band), a Chilean rock band
