= Glup! =

Chilean pop rock band

- Origin: Osorno, Los Lagos, Chile
- Genres: Chilean rock, Indie rock
- Years active: 1996−2003; 2011; 2019; 2022–present
- Labels: BMG-Chile, Glup-Oficial
- Past members: Koko Stambuk; Rodrígo Stambuk; Vid Stambuk; Rodrigo Vizcarra; Gustavo Labrín; Tim Picchetti; Marcel Molina

Glup! is a Chilean pop rock band formed in 1996, led by frontman Koko Stambuk. Commercially successful in Chile, the band has sought to reach international markets in recent years. Since their breakthrough hit "Freebola" (1999), which drew inspiration from Britpop, Glup! has evolved its distinctive musical style, incorporating influences from artists such as Manu Chao and The Strokes, and from urban music. After recording three albums and gaining popularity with songs such as "Enamorado de ti" and "Puta jefe", the band went on hiatus, with Stambuk pursuing a career as a producer, songwriter, and soloist in Mexico and the United States. In 2019, Glup! reunited to release its first single in 15 years, "Chíngale", a song which explored Mexican slang. In 2022, the band released a cover of "Provenza" by Colombian singer Karol G.

== History ==
They were active in the period from 1996 to 2003, with reunions in 2011, 2019 and from 2022 to the present. In 1999 the band performed at the Viña del Mar International Song Festival, after gaining mainstream popularity in Chile due to their adolescent lyrics and catchy melodies. "Freebola", released in 1999, was the group's commercial breakthrough and their signature song.

== Discography ==
=== Singles ===
- "Freebola" (1999)
- "Chíngale" (2019)
- "Provenza" (2022)

=== Albums ===
- 1999 (1999)
