= Patricio Renán =

Chilean New Wave singer (1945–2022)

Patricio Renán (born Renán Patricio Sánchez Gajardo, 4 January 1945 – 5 March 2022), also known as Pato Renán, was a Chilean singer who became famous during the Chilean New Wave (or Chilean "Nueva Ola") era of 1960s music. Known mostly as a rock-pop singer, Renán was also a ballad singer.

== Life and career ==
Renán was born in Concepcion, but he was raised in Penco. His career began after winning a singing contest organized by a local radio station in his teenage years. The prize included going to the capital to record and promote a song. In 1965, Renán moved to Santiago, where he debuted as a singer. He was then recognized as one of the "Nueva Ola" stars, (in Chile; there were Nueva Olas also in other Spanish-speaking countries at the same time) alongside other popular Chilean singers of the time such as his friend Cecilia. In 1966, Renán made his international debut, singing at the Festival de Trujillo in Trujillo, Peru.

Renán recorded ten albums, and he was awarded a "Gaviota de Plata" award at the 1972 Vina del Mar International Song Festival.

Among his hits are "Por Amor" (not to be confused with a Menudo song of the same name), "Son Recuerdos" and "Soy Culpable".

He experienced a reboot in his career in the early 2000's when he won 2nd place in a weekly live-singing competition of all-stars called "Rojo VIP" on "Television Nacional" TV channel. Fans would call during the broadcast and vote for their favorite performance. The finalists proceeded to record and album and go on a national tour, along with a cash prize.

== Death ==
Renán died of natural causes at home in La Reina, Santiago, on 5 March 2022, at the age of 77. His family was present throughout his illness as well as during his last days. He is survived by his widow, Maritza, and 3 children (Maria Elena, Maria Veronica and Sebastian Patricio). Renán is buried in his beloved town of Penco, next to his mother's grave. His widow and children brought his ashes back to his hometown, as were his last wishes. The city of Penco recognized his career and contributions to the region by hosting a collection of his records and awards at the historical museum of Penco the year after his death. These items were graciously donated by his family to the town's museum to contribute to the region's musical history and culture. In addition, there is a plaque in the town's square with his name. Throughout his life, Renán received the title of "Hijo ilustre de Penco" twice throughout his life.

== See also ==
- Chilean rock
- List of Chileans
