= Nueva ola =

South American rock music genre

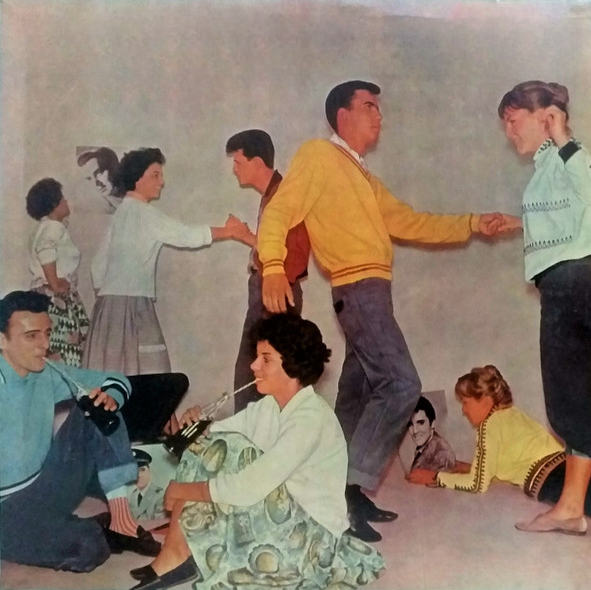
- Photograph used on the cover of a nueva ola record released in Argentina in 1960. An example of the "Americanization" that characterized the new youth mass culture, it depicts young people dancing rock and roll, drinking Coca-Cola, wearing blue jeans and admiring American singers.
- Stylistic origins: Pop music; rock and roll; twist; canción melódica; doo-wop; surf rock; romantic ballad; Latin American music; garage rock
- Cultural origins: Late 1950s to early 1960s, Hispanic America
- Typical instruments: Electric guitar; double bass; bass guitar; drums; vocals

Other topics
- Jovem Guarda; yé-yé

The nueva ola (Spanish for "new wave") was a cultural phenomenon that took place in several Hispanic American countries between the late 1950s and the mid-to-late 1960s, linked to the spread of new musical styles aimed at young people—such as pop, rock and roll and the twist—which "constituted the fundamental channels for the transformation of consumption, leisure, and youth fashions" of the time. It was a regional manifestation of a phenomenon occurring in much of the Western world: the emergence of a new market segment made up of young people with their own habits and shared codes that set them apart from their parents' generation. In countries such as Argentina, young people were introduced to rock and roll music through films like Blackboard Jungle (1955) and Rock Around the Clock (1956)—both featuring music by Bill Haley & His Comets—and quickly adopted it as one of the traits identifying them as an independent social group, along with the use of blue jeans (locally "vaqueros"). The nueva ola was not a homogeneous musical style but encompassed a wide range of genres, including rock and roll, pop, surf rock, romantic ballads and even Latin American music such as bolero and cumbia, constituting a musical scene in which artists, record buyers, record labels, and mass media interacted.

Noticing the growing popularity of American rock and roll and pop among young audiences and the commercial potential of adapting them into Spanish, multinational labels—mainly RCA Victor and Columbia Records—promoted the nueva ola in countries such as Argentina, Chile, Mexico and Peru, creating a new set of teen idols while relying on the expansion of mass media, especially radio and television. The figure of these new youth idols followed an international pattern, analogous to the yé-yé phenomenon in France, as well as the cases of Rita Pavone in Italy, Petula Clark in England, the Dúo Dinámico in Spain and Roberto Carlos with the Jovem Guarda in Brazil, among others. In fact, much of the repertoire of nueva ola performers consisted of versions of American and European hits. Although presented as a phenomenon of cultural modernization for youth, the nueva ola promoted family values and traditional gender roles, omitting the rebellious potential of rock and roll and creating a "softened" version, something similar to what had also occurred in the United States and Europe.

In Argentina—the main promoter of the nueva ola in South America and the country where the term was coined—the epitome of the phenomenon was El Club del Clan (1962–1964), a successful television program that launched the country's first teen idols, including Violeta Rivas, Johnny Tedesco, Raúl Lavié, Jolly Land, Chico Novarro, and especially Palito Ortega, the most popular of the group. The nueva ola also had an important presence in Chile, with performers such as Buddy Richard, Danny Chilean, Los Red Juniors, Luis Dimas, José Alfredo Fuentes, Fresia Soto and Cecilia, who in 1965 won the Viña del Mar Festival. In Colombia, the movement was also known as "go-gó" and "ye-yé," promoted by producers Carlos Pinzón and Alfonso Lizarazo, and reinforced through a local version of El Club del Clan. In Peru, some of the best-known idols included Pepe Miranda, Gustavo "Hit" Moreno, Pepe Cipolla and Joe Danova, although the label nueva ola also encompassed groups that would later be considered by Peruvian rock historians as outside the phenomenon, such as Los Saicos and Los Shain's.

== Argentina ==
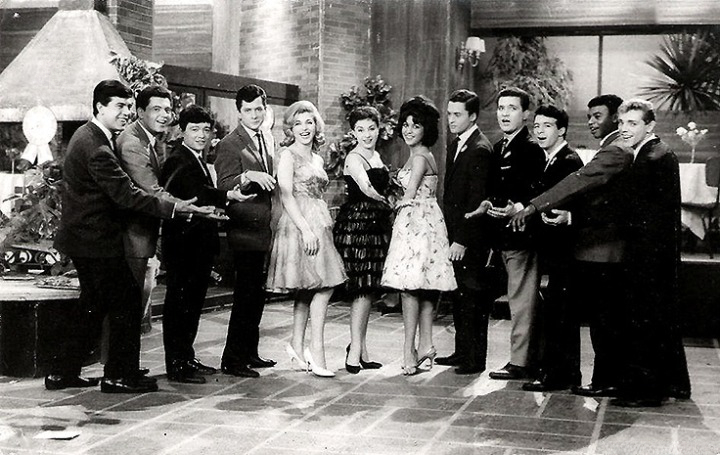
The cast of El Club del Clan, c. 1962–1964. From left to right: Raúl Lavié, Galo Cárdenas, Nicky Jones, Palito Ortega, Violeta Rivas, Cachita Galán, Dolores De Cicco, Lalo Fransen, Paco Amor, Raúl Cobián, Perico Gómez and Johny Tedesco.

In 1960, RCA Victor general manager Ricardo Mejía discovered through a market research that there were almost no popular music stars among the youth. As a result, the company began the selection of new singers, initiating the phenomenon of the nueva ola in Argentina. Led by Mejía, RCA executives partnered with future journalist Leo Vanes and musicians Ray Nolan and Jimmy Lerman to create the TV show El club del clan. Based on foreign music shows, each episode showed a group of friends that got together to perform various styles of music including rock 'n' roll (and the accompanying twist), bolero and cumbia. The personality of each interpreter was modeled taking into account the type of music they would sing. The show aired on Canal 13 on Saturdays at 8:30 pm, and proved to be extremely successful for RCA. It turned its young cast—which included Palito Ortega, Billy Caffaro, Violeta Rivas, Lalo Fransen, Nicky Jones and Cachita Galán—into the first national teen idols. Journalist Miguel Grinberg described El club del clan in 2006 as "a kind of juvenile ebullition that, impelled by television, established a basic difference, that was young people who did not reproduce the music of their parents."

In 1964, after The Beatles' performances in the United States, Beatlemania also reached Argentina, generating the appearance of several bands that imitated their sound and fashion. The nueva ola was overshadowed by the popularity of British Invasion bands, while at the same time a feeling nonconformity grew among the youth, which saw the phenomenon as too carefree and compliant. Before the dissolution of the group and "as a farewell," an El club del clan film directed by Enrique Carreras was released on March 12, 1964.
