= Peter Rock (musician) =

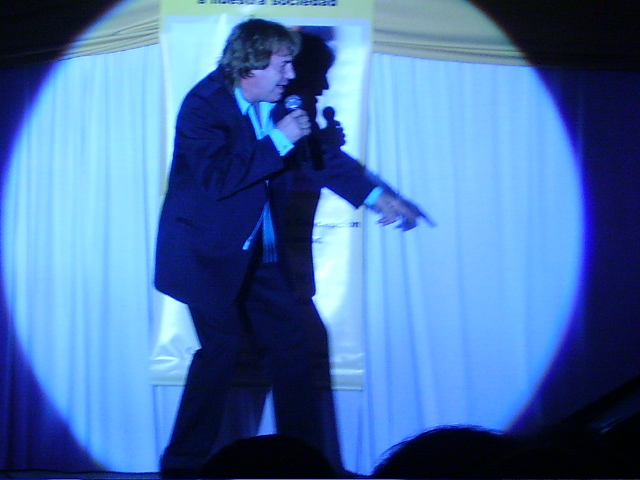
- Peter Rock in 2015

Background information
- Born: Peter Mociulski von Remenyk; 3 September 1945; Vienna, Austria
- Died: 16 April 2016 (aged 70) Viña del Mar, Chile
- Genres: Nueva ola; rock and roll
- Occupation: Musician
- Instruments: Guitar; vocals
- Years active: 1959–2014

Peter Mociulski von Remenyk (3 September 1945 – 16 April 2016), known professionally as Peter Rock, was an Austrian-born Chilean rock and roll and nueva ola musician. He sang in Festival de Viña del Mar and in Bierfest Valdivia.

He was born near Vienna in 1945, shortly after the death of his father. His mother remarried and the family emigrated to Chile in 1955.

Peter Rock's son, Justin Leigh, resides in Los Angeles and his daughter Natalie lived with him in Santiago, Chile. Peter Rock is Alain Johannes' uncle.

In October 2014, he was diagnosed with ALS, which kept him in a wheelchair. He died in Viña del Mar on 16 April 2016.
