= Love, Peace & Poetry – Vol.9 Turkish =

Love, Peace & Poetry: Turkish Psychedelic Music

Compilation album by Various artists
- Released: November 22, 2005
- Genre: Psychedelic rock
- Labels: QDK Media; Normal

Love, Peace & Poetry chronology
| Love, Peace & Poetry - Vol.8 African (2004) | Love, Peace & Poetry: Turkish Psychedelic Music (2005) | Love, Peace & Poetry - Vol.10 Chilean (2008) |

Professional ratings
Review scores
| Source | Rating |
|---|---|
| Dusted Magazine | (mixed) link |
| Orlando Weekly | (positive) link |
| PopMatters | link |

Love, Peace & Poetry – Vol.9 Turkish is the ninth volume in the Love, Peace & Poetry series released by QDK Media and Normal Records in 2005. This volume explores obscuro garage rock and psychedelic rock bands from Turkey.

A Track with a Sample of "Ince Ince Bir Kar Yagar" was created by Oh No (Dr. No's Oxperiment, 2007) and has later been used in commercials for the videogame Skate 2.

== Track listing ==
1. "Bundan Sonra" (Selda Bağcan from the album "Vurulduk Ey Halkim Unutma Bizi") – 4:09
2. "Uzun Ince Bir Yoldayim " (Özdemir Erdogan Ve Orkestrasi) – 3:13
3. "Kirpiklerin Ok Ok Eyle" (Alpay) – 1:58
4. "Sür Efem Atini" (Mazhar and Fuat from the album "Türküz Türkü Çağırırız!") – 2:23
5. "Yagmur" (Erkin Koray) – 3:33
6. "Kara Yazi" (Ersen ve Dadaşlar from the album "Dünden Bugüne") – 3:28
7. "Yakar Inceden Inceden" (Edip Akbayram) – 3:49
8. "Bir Yagmur Masali" (Hardal from the album "Nasil Ne Zaman") – 6:12
9. "Ince Ince Bir Kar Yagar" (Selda) – 3:40
10. "Hop Dedik" (Erol Büyükburç from the album "Hop Dedik") – 3:28
11. "Tatli Dillim" (Cem Karaca from the album "Kardaslar Apaslar") – 4:13
12. "Aglarsa Anam Aglar" (Üç Hürel from the album "Hürel Arsivi") – 3:21
13. "Kirpiklerin Ok Ok Eyle" (Barış Manço from the album "Dünden Bugüne") – 4:12
14. "Haliçte Günesin Batisi" (Mogollar from the album "Anadolu Pop") – 4:11
15. "Sen Varsin" (Bülent Ortaçgil from the album "Benimle OynarMisin") – 2:11
16. "Gitmek Düstü Bana" (Erkut Taçkin from the album "Benimle OynarMisin") – 2:49
