= Atomic Aggressor =

Chilean death metal band

- Origin: Santiago, Chile
- Genre: Death metal
- Years active: 1985–1990, 2007–present
- Members: Enrique Zúñiga Gomez; Alejandro Díaz; Julio Bórquez; Pablo Clares

Atomic Aggressor is a band started in the mid-1980s in Chile, a well-known exponent of Chilean death metal. Its early influences were from bands such as Celtic Frost and Trouble.

== History ==
The beginnings of the band date back to early 1985, but it did not stabilize until 1988, after countless member changes. By then, Enrique Zúñiga was on the guitar, Patricio "Patomic" Leiva on drums, Alejandro Diaz on vocals and bass and Jaime Moya on the second guitar. With these members the band had its debut on 26 November 1988, in an outdoor show in the center of the city of Santiago de Chile, where it appeared alongside Chilean bands Massakre, Darkness, Squad, Nimrod and Anarkía.

The following year the band recorded their first demo, Bloody Ceremonial, which is considered to be one of the best underground works of the country. This production, which sold over a thousand copies, consisted of four tracks (Beyond Reality, Bleed in the Altar, Bloody Ceremonial, and The Session) and enhanced the reputation of the band in both the Chilean national scene and internationally. This success opened the doors for them to participate in numerous concerts including Necro Metal, a typical underground concert of that period held at Villa Alemana, Chile, and the concert of Concepción in 1989 where they shared the stage with Death Yell, Cerberus and Hades.

In 1990, they recorded a promo tape with four songs called Rehearsal. After this recording, the drummer, Patricio Leiva, left the band and was replaced initially by Cristian Gonzalez and later permanently by Pablo Clares.

In 1991, after a tour which they undertook with Sadism in northern Chile, they recorded their second demo "Resurrection". However, in 1992, unable to bounce back from losing their drummer and other internal problems, the band separated, playing for the last time on 9 May 1992 in Valparaíso, Chile.

Fifteen years later, in 2007, they got back together with Enrique Zúñiga on guitar, Alejandro Diaz on vocals and bass, Pablo Clares on drums and Julio Borquez on second guitar. With this lineup, they recorded "Rise of the Ancient Ones".

A major presentation took place in June 2011, where they opened for American band Slayer. Atomic Aggressor are still playing together.

In February 2015 they performed at the "Natales Metal Fest" in Puerto Natales with Exanimatvm, a death metal band from Punta Arenas, Attaker Bloody Axe from Valdivia and Blasfematorio from Puerto Montt, among other bands. So far, this is the southernmost band presentation.

== Discography ==
=== Demos ===
- Bloody Ceremonial (1989)
- Promo Rehearsal Tape (1990)
- Resurrection (1991)

=== Albums ===
- Rise of the Old Ones (2008)
- Sights of Suffering (2014), Hells Headbangers, Rawforce Records

=== EPs ===
- Invoking the Primal Chaos (2019)
