= Los Beat 4 =

Chilean music group

Los Beat 4 is a Chilean rock band from that enjoyed early success in the 1960s and early 1970s, influenced by the wave of Beatlemania. Among their contributions to Chilean music is recording one of the first Chilean rock albums recorded in Spanish, Boots A Go-Go.

== History ==
Los Beat 4 was formed in 1966 in San Miguel, Chile. They formed part of the Chilean new wave movement, along others such as Pato Renan, Cecilia and others. They had many hits, including "Dame un Bananino", a jingle for a Nestle ice cream product, and "Llora conmigo", a Spanish-language version of "Let's Live for Today".

== Band members ==
- Reinaldo "Rhino" González – voice (1966–1971)
- Johnny Paniagua – guitar (1966–1971)
- Willy Benítez – bass (1966–1971)
- Mario Benítez – drums (1966–1971)
- Linden Mandiola – bass (1971)
