= Cachita Galán =

Argentine singer

Leticia Noemí De León (stage name, Cachita Galán; 1943 in Buenos Aires – 2 December 2004, in Parque Patricios) was an Argentine singer. She is remembered for her vocal interpretations at the Club del Clan, and for her performance in the 1964 film El Club del clan.

== Early years and education ==
Galan studied classical dance from an early age and made a career as a dancer during her childhood. She also loved sports, especially swimming. By age eight, she was singing Spanish songs. She performed in theaters dedicated to that genre, such as Avenida and Tronío, with Pedrito Rico, Pablo del Río and Lolita Torres.

== Career ==
With "Los Gavilanes of Spain", she debuted in Ecuador, along with the tenor, Galo Cárdenas, whom she also married when she was 19 years old. Together, they were performed at La Cantina de la Guardia Nueva. Her fame accelerated after performing on the TV program El Club del Clan, which was popular in the 1960s, along with her contemporaries Violeta Rivas, Raúl Lavié, Johny Tedesco, Nicky Jones, Chico Novarro, Palito Ortega and Lalo Fransen. Along with Rivas and Jolly Land, she formed a female vocal trio. The producer, Ricardo Mejía, gave her the nickname, Cachita, and encouraged her to sign, strut, and dance.

Traveling to Ecuador, they met with success at El Club del Clan, touring the country, as well as Venezuela, Colombia, Perú, México, appearing at the Hilton chain, and other night spot. When her daughter was born, she stopped performing for a few years. Then she returned to Los Gavilanes de España and also joined the orchestra of Casino Show, which toured in Spain, performing Spanish and Brazilian pieces. In 1964, she appeared in the Argentine film, Club del Clan, under the direction of Enrique Carreras, with Beatriz Bonet, Fernando Siro, Pedro Quartucci, Alfredo Barbieri and Tito Climent, where she sang the song, Soplame un beso. She is also remember for performing with the Roberto Casal Orchestra, including the pieces, El labrador, Juancho, Cumbia litoraleña and Interesada.

== Personal life ==
After her daughter Nadia was born, she separated from her husband, and never remarried. Galan died on 2 December 2004 at the age of 61, a victim of a cancer which she had fought for four years. Her remains were cremated in the Cementerio de la Chacarita.

== Interpretations ==
- Noche y día, with Lalo Fransen
- Cara sucia
- Señor elefante, with Perico Gómez
- Don Juan Ramón
- Sóplame un beso
- Las Cerezas
- Alumbra, alumbra luna
- Besucona

== Filmography ==
- 1964: Club del Clan

== Television ==
- 1961: Ritmo y juventud
- 1962: Cantarela
- 1963: El club del clan
