= Cholomandinga =

- Origin: Concepción, Chile
- Genres: Ska, Reggae, Funk
- Years active: 1996–present
- Labels: Sello Azul, Dicap
- Website: cholomandinga.com

Cholomandinga is a Chilean music band, formed in Concepción in 1996; the band is characterised by its Latin rhythms and ironic lyrics.

== History ==
The band, originally from Concepción, was formed in 1996 by Karrumba (voice), Mauricio Chazcón Lermanda (guitar), Cristian Flako Lara (bass), Víctor Garrido (drums) and Marcelo Sánchez (percussion). Its name was derived from "cholo", a slang word for a man of African body complexion, and "mandinga" – a countryside nickname of devil. At the beginning they were performing throughout eighth region; later they moved to the capital city Santiago. In 2003 was released their first disc, "Porque Chile es porno", including the hits "El Partío" y "El opio", characterized by simple, entertaining lyrics. Their second release, "En toma", was in 2007.

== Members ==
=== Current members ===
- Carrumba, vocals (1996– •).
- Iván Fredes, guitar (2007– •).
- Miguel González, drums and percussion (2007– •).
- Samy Maluenda, bass (2009– •).
- Alvaro "Tio" Quinchagual, clarinet
- Juan Contreras, trombone

=== Former members ===
- Mauricio Chazcón Lermanda, guitar (2001–2007).
- Cristian Flako Lara, bass and Peruvian cajón (1996–2005).
- Víctor Garrido, drums (1996–2001).
- Marcelo Sánchez, percussion (1996–).
- Sammy Molano, drums and percussion (2001–2005).
- Renzo Valenzuela, congas, timbal and percussion (2002).
- Rodrigo Gómez, trumpet (2002–2004).
- Daniel Danielitro Carmona, trombone (2002–2007).
- Eduardo Oso Jorquera, saxophone and flute (2002–2007).
- Ignacio Pelao Ferrera, trumpet (2004–2007).
- Negro Cristi, bass (2005–2009).
- Pato Pailamilla, trumpet (2007–2009).
- Esteban Núñez, saxophone (2007–2009).
- Negro Medel, bass (2009).
- Nico Errazuriz, keyboard (2009–2010).
- Sebastian Barrera, congas, timbal and percussion (2009–2011).

== Discography ==
Year	Title	Label
2003	Porque Chile es porno	Sello Azul
2007	En toma	Dicap
2008	En Vivo	Oveja Negra
2010	La Aguita de la Perdiz	Independiente
