= Panzer (Chilean band) =

Chilean heavy metal band

- Origin: Chile
- Genre: Heavy Metal
- Years active: 1987–present
- Labels: Warner Music; CBS
- Members: Juanzer; Kano Alvarez; Eduardo Alarcon; Felipe Cortez; Diego Hernandez
- Website: www.panzerrockchile.cl

Panzer is a Chilean heavy metal band formed in 1987.

== History ==
Panzer debuted in 1987 after its contributions to the compilation Infierno Rock. In 1988, the band was elected by peers and journalists as the best Chilean rock group, a title it held for two consecutive years. This coincided with the release of their first album Metal Land in 1988, followed by its 1989 Latin American re-release in an attempt to establish the band in other Spanish-speaking markets.

In 1989, Panzer appeared in Latinos y Metálicos, a compilation of heavy metal from Argentina, Colombia, Mexico and Spain. The official launch for the album was at the Stadium of Buenos Aires Waterworks.

Lyrics reflecting widespread youth issues and the band's classic cut of heavy metal became the trademark of Panzer. In October 1994, the album Crol Vivo o Muerto was released. After returning from Argentina, where the band aimed to promote sales, Panzer opened for the American metal band Megadeth.

In January 1995, the group went on a national tour of Chile, its destinations including Arica and Punta Arenas. The tour ended in November with its final show in Quinta Vergara in Viña del Mar. In December 1995, Panzer was awarded the "Tribute to national rock" by the Ministerial Secretariat of Education for the band's "influence on the development and evolution of rock in Chile".

In August 1996, Panzer opened for Iron Maiden's first concert in Chile at the Teatro Monumental in front of 7,000 people. On October 22, Panzer was the opening act for the AC/DC concert at the National Stadium Velodrome with an audience of 20,000 people. In November, En el nombre de... was released.

=== Recent years ===
In 1998, Rock & Roll addiction was released. The album consisted of recorded live performances during Panzer's opening acts for Iron Maiden and AC/DC. On December 12, 1998, Panzer opened for Anthrax and Slayer in the Chile National Stadium.

The band members at the time were Juan Alvarez (guitar and composition), Khano Alvarez (lead guitar), Beto Lopez (singer), Jose Aravena (bass) and Coty Correa (drums). Panzer was the opening act for Deep Purple's show of March 1999 and performed at the 2001 "Grandes del rock hispano" festival in the Estadio Victor Jara with Barón Rojo and Rata Blanca

On February 10, 2020, at the age of 69, Juan Álvarez passed away from a serious illness he had been battling for some time.

== Discography ==
=== Albums ===
- Tierra de metales (1988)
- Crol Vivo o Muerto (1994)
- En el nombre de... (1996)
- Rock & Roll addiction (1998)
- Generación del Alkithran (2007)
- Y volveremos a caer... (2012)

=== Other Releases ===
- Infierno Rock (1987)
- Latinos y Metálicos (1989)
- Con el corazón aquí (1993)
- Volver a renacer (Single, 2020)
- Hombre de metal (Single, 2020)
- El legado (Single, 2022)
- Fuego del alma (Single, 2023)
- Huellas de la calle (Single, 2026)
