= Supersordo =

Chilean post-hardcore band formed in 1991 and separated in 1997

- Origin: Santiago, Chile
- Genres: Rock, post-hardcore, punk rock, heavy metal
- Years active: 1991—1997
- Labels: CFA, Inferno, Toxic
- Members: Claudio Fernández; Rodrigo "Katafú" Rozas; Miguel Ángel "Comegato" Montenegro; Jorge Cortés
- Past members: Sebastián "Tan" Levine
- Website: MySpace page

Supersordo was a Chilean post-hardcore band, formed in 1991 and separated in 1997.

The genre of the band is a hybrid of "punk and metal", classified as rock, punk, metal and post-hardcore, with noise, emo, hardcore and thrash metal influences. With Black Flag, Sonic Youth, Melvins, Fugazi, Jawbox, Girls Against Boys, The Jesus Lizard and Shellac influence.

== History ==
The first formation was Claudio Fernández (vocals/drums), Rodrigo Rozas (guitar) and Miguel Ángel Montenegro (bass), under the name Matt Monro, the members participated in groups such as Superfetazione, Raptional Scream, Contabini Perubiani, Necrosis, Armagedon and Fallout. Although because Claudio Fernández had trouble playing drums and singing at once, joined Jorge Cortéz, the name of the band was renamed Supersordo.

In April 1992, the four-piece band recorded the first cassette: Supersórdido, in "El Rancho Studios", produced by Archi Frugone and independent label "Toxic Records". In April 2008, the Chilean edition of Rolling Stone Magazine positioned the album in No. 11 among the 50 best Chilean albums of all times.

In 1995, the band recorded the second cassette album, called Tzzzzzzzzt' in "RED Studios", except for two songs (21 and El niño azul) recorded in "El Rancho Studios" with the drummer Sebastián Levine (formerly of Pinochet Boys, Electrodomésticos and María Sonora). The album was released with "Inferno Records" (extinct label) and the producer José Luis Corral.

In August 1997, the band played with US band Fugazi in Chile, with the band Silencio Absoluto. During that year participated in the CFA Records compilation album called Uno, with the bands Fiskales Ad-hok, Políticos Muertos, and others. Supersordo is on hiatus since late 1997, since the separation, each member joined the band as Cáncer, Yajaira, Niño Símbolo and Agencia Chilena del Espacio.

In 2000, CFA Records released the posthumous album called Un Ruído Inmenso de Rock, with live songs and never-released demos.

== Members ==
- Claudio Fernández — lead vocals (1991-1997), drums (1991)
- Rodrigo "Katafú" Rozas — guitar (1991-1997), backing vocals (live)
- Miguel Ángel "Comegato" Montenegro — bass (1991-1997)
- Jorge Cortés — drums, percussion (1991-1995, 1995-1997)
- Sebastián "Tan" Levine — drums, percussion (1995)

== Discography ==
- Supersórdido (Studio album, 1992, Toxic Records)
- Tzzzzzzzzt (Studio album, 1995, Inferno Records)
- Uno (compilation/split album, 1997, CFA Records)
- Demo 1997 (1997, autoreleased)
- Un Ruído Inmenso de Rock (compilation/live album, 2000, CFA Records)
- Lluvia de piedras (compilation album, 2014 Miranada Records/Hachazo Records)
