= Freebola =

Single by Glup!

from the album 1999
- Released: 1998
- Genre: Pop rock, Rock en Español
- Songwriter(s): Koko Stambuk

Freebola, also known as Chica Light, is a pop rock song by Chilean rock band Glup! featured in their debut album 1999. The name of the song is a portmanteau of the word free and frivolous. The song became an instant hit in Chile and, due to it fast tempo, has persisted as a classic in Chilean discothèques.
