= Profetas y Frenéticos =

- Origin: Santiago, Chile
- Genre: Rock,
- Years active: 1991–1996; 2013-present
- Label: Alerce
- Past members: Luis González; Juan Pablo Rojas; Dagoberto González; Jorge Narea; Claudio Narea
- Website: losprisioneros.org

Profetas y Frenéticos is a Chilean rockabilly band formed in 1991 by Luis González, Juan Pablo Rojas, Dagoberto González, Jorge Narea and Claudio Narea, a former Los Prisioneros band member.

During the band's existence it released two albums, Profetas y Frenéticos in 1991 and Nuevo Orden in 1992, this last one as an homage to the band New Order. None of the two albums reached sales above 10,000 copies.
