= The Clan Club =

1964 film

El club del clan
- Directed by: Enrique Carreras
- Written by: Alexis de Arancibia
- Starring: Palito Ortega; Violeta Rivas; Johny Tedesco
- Cinematography: Alberto Etchebehere
- Release date: 1964
- Country: Argentina
- Language: Spanish

The Clan Club (El club del clan) is a 1964 Argentine film directed by Enrique Carreras.

== Cast ==
- Cachita Galán
- Palito Ortega
- Violeta Rivas
- Johny Tedesco
- Jolly Land
