= Weichafe =

Mapuche warrior

A weichafe is a Mapuche warrior. Among Mapuche communities in Lumaco and Traiguén weichafes play an important role in nguillatun by ritualistically representing the weichan or combat of the winds prior to harvest. The role of the weichafe is associated with the attributes of strength and austerity. 17th century Jesuit missionary Diego de Rosales described weichafes as robust, agile and hardy.
