= Massakre (band) =

Chilean thrash metal band

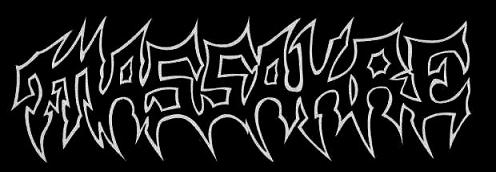
- Massakre's logo

Background information
- Origin: Santiago, Chile
- Genres: Thrash metal, death metal
- Years active: 1982–1990; 1999–present
- Label: Negative Productions
- Members: Yanko Tólic; Eduardo Vidal; Héctor Melo; Gabriel Heard
- Website: massakre.scd.cl

Massakre is a Chilean thrash metal band that pioneered the genre in Chile and Latin America.

The band started as a garage band from 1982 to 1984, and moved into thrash metal in 1985. They have released four studio albums and various demos and compilations. They used corpse paint as a thrash metal band, later imitated by others.

== History ==
=== Beginnings ===
Yanko Tólic started unsuccessful garage band called Sepulcro in 1982 and later changed the name to Embrión. In the early 80s, the Chilean scene was dominated by rock bands like Tumulto, Sol y Medianoche and Congreso. Influenced by Celtic Frost, Slayer and Hellhammer, he switched to thrash metal and founded Massakre in 1985, recruiting Andrés Cabrío Marchant from Necrosis. The band appeared in major events in Santiago and Valparaiso, where there was great support for this type of music, alongside groups like Pentagram, Belial, Tormentor and Vulcano.

=== Career ===
After completing a successful festival tour, the band released some demo tapes that became popular, the first being Pissing into the Mass Grave in 1986, followed the same year by Altazor and Beyond the Psychotic Redemption in 1988. The latter contains the song "Morbid Death" that became a metal anthem for followers. But with success came controversy. A great point of opposition to the band was their use of corpse paint, which brought in claims of Satanic rituals and animal sacrifice and being possessed by evil spirits. The band tried to stop these rumours, but the accusations continued.

Massakre released its first studio album in 1989, titled Massacre. Although being thrash metal, it contained symphonic touches, and a conceptual story that linked all the songs. In 2001 they released the better-produced album Psychotic Redemption. With the release of their third studio album Crematorium in 2005, the band incorporated speed metal influences. The band continued to release material and has witnessed a comeback with the band also appearing in metal festivals like The Metal Fest in 2012.

== Members ==
=== Band members ===
- Yanko Tólic – vocals, rhythm guitar (1982–present)
- Eduardo Vidal – bass guitar (1986–2003, 2005–present)
- Gabriel Head – lead guitar (2004–present)
- Héctor Melo – drums, percussion (2010–present)

=== Past members ===
- Andres Nacrur – drums (1985–1986, 1998)
- Jose Miguel Nacrur – guitar (1985–1986)
- Mauricio Yañez – drums (1985)
- Alfredo Torres – guitar (1985)
- Christian Miccolo – bass (1985)
- Claudio Muñoz – drums (1986)
- Marco Carreño – drums (1987 to 1990)
- Manuel Castro – keyboards (1989–1990)
- Alain Saintard – vocals (1990)
- Patricio Albornoz – drums (1999)

== Discography ==
=== Demos ===
- Pissing into the Mass Grave (1986)
- Altazor (1986)
- Beyond the Psychotic Redemption (1988)

=== Albums ===
- Massacre (1989)
- Psychotic Redemption (2001)
- Crematorium (2005)

=== EPs ===
- In Aeternum (2011)

=== Compilations ===
- Back from the Mass Grave (2006)
- Pissing into the Mass Grave + Fantasmas (2007)

=== Singles ===
- Mortuary (2011)

=== Not officially released ===
- Demo I (1986)
- Demo II (1986)
