= Los Mac's =

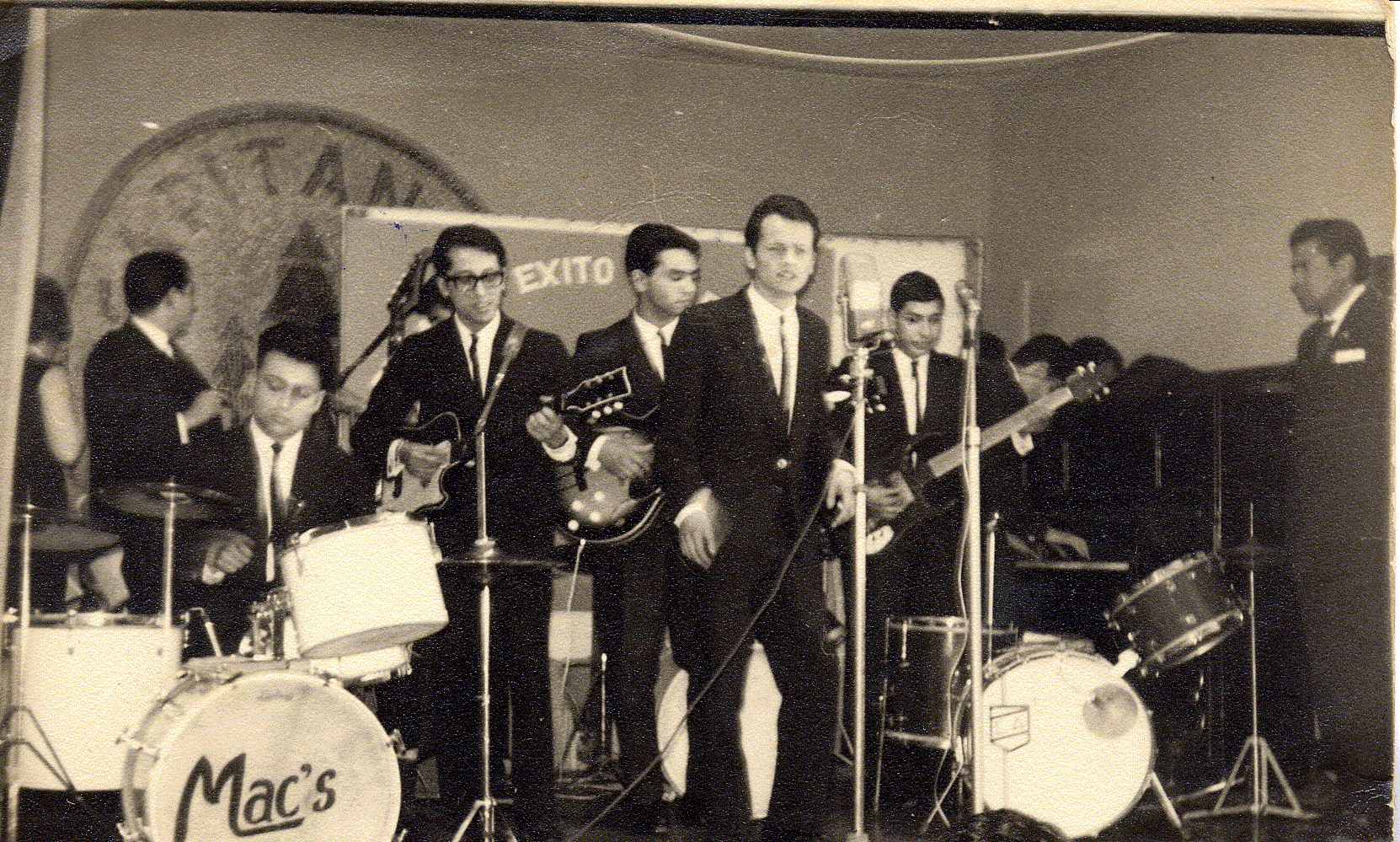
- Los Mac's in Valparaíso in 1963. Edward Carter, David Mac Iver, Gabriel Marambio, Carlos Mac Iver, Jose Soto and Daniel Yovanovic (back on the piano).

Background information
- Origin: Valparaíso, Chile
- Genres: Rock and roll
- Years active: 1962–1969; 2010–present
- Label: RCA Records
- Members: David MacIver; Carlos MacIver; Willy Morales; Eric Franklin

Los Mac's is a pioneering Chilean rock band, formed in Valparaíso in 1962. The recorded the classic song "La Muerte de mi Hermano" as part of their 1967 album Kaleidescope Men. As of 2014, a version of the band continues to play.

== History ==
The group began in 1962 in the district of Playa Ancha in Valparaíso, as a rock cover band, coming to the attention of national radio stations. The surname of the band's founders, brothers David and Carlos Mac-Iver, gave rise to the group's name. During their teenage years in Playa Ancha, the Mac-Iver brothers often met with people on the Chilean cultural scene. such as singer-songwriters Gitano Rodriguez, Payo Grondona and the poet Sergio Badilla Castillo. After playing at festivals and universities in Valparaíso, the band moved to Santiago, where they met the talented drummer Eric Franklin and later the composer and singer Willy Morales, who shared the same musical interests . Now with their own songs, Los Mac's began a new era that would mark the history of rock. The band's initial singles were recorded in 1965 under a deal with the record company RCA. RCA supported the 1966 album Go Go/22, Los Mac's' first LP, with shades of The Beatles, the Rolling Stones, the Kinks, The Shadows and Bob Dylan, with Willy Morales taking such influences in his own direction. The Mac's were strongly influenced by the Beatles' Sgt Pepper's Lonely Hearts Club Band, which led them to experiment with psychedelic sounds, recording the album Kaleidoscope Men in late 1967. This is perhaps his most representative work of Chilean beat rock. In 1968, the group, decided to go to Europe, with a farewell concert at Universidad Santa María. They spent time in Genoa, Italy, but for different reasons the band split the following year.

== Recording Members ==
- David Mac-Iver (Guitar and Vocals)
- Carlos Mac-Iver (Bass and Vocals)
- Willy Morales (Guitar, Keyboards and Vocals)
- Eric Franklin (Drums)

== Discography ==
- 1965 - 22 A Go Go
- 1966 - G.G. Session By The Mac's
- 1967 - Kaleidoscope Men
- 1968 - Los Mac's
- 2010 - El Tiempo es lo de Menos
- 2015 - Regreso a casa
