= Aguaturbia =

Chilean psychedelic rock band

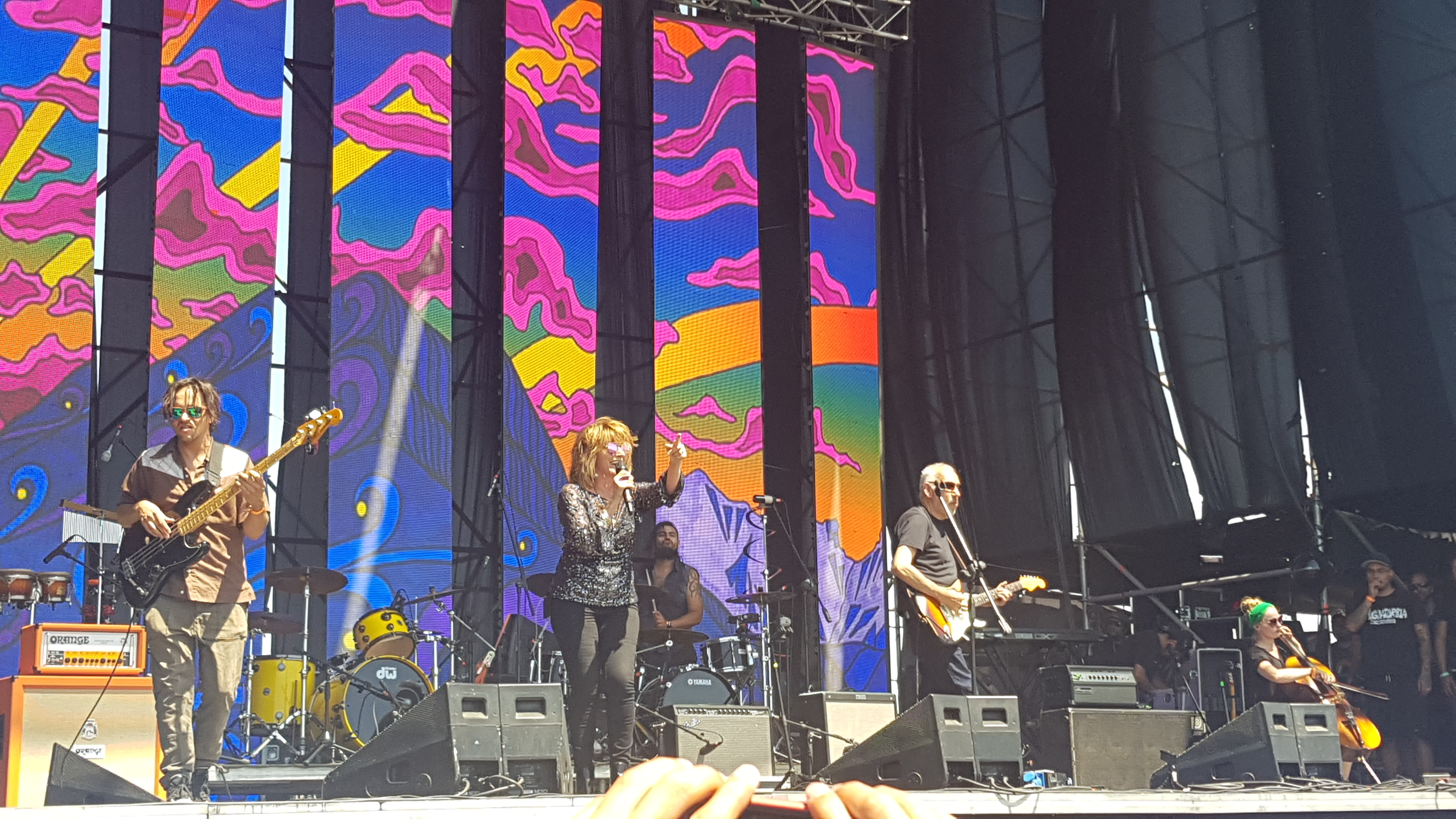
- Aguaturbia performing in 2018

Background information
- Origin: Chile
- Genres: Psychedelic rock
- Years active: 1969–1974; 1993–present
- Label: Arena
- Members: Carlos Corales (guitar); Denise (vocals); Francisco Arancibia (bass); Pablo Reitter (drums); Magdalena Rust (cello); Gustavo Alburquerque (piano)
- Past members: Willy Cavada (drums); Ricardo Briones (bass)

Aguaturbia is a Chilean rock band formed in 1969, featuring Denise Corales on vocals and her husband Carlos on guitar. The band is known for pioneering heavy psychedelic rock in Chile, eventually enjoying international acclaim. In addition to psychedelic sounds, wah-wah guitar effects and heavy blues rock chord patterns, Aguaturbia also incorporated elements of Latin American folk music into their work. The band is noted for causing controversy in the Chilean press at the time for stepping outside of prevailing social norms.

Original drummer Willy Cavada died on 1 October 2013.

== Band members ==
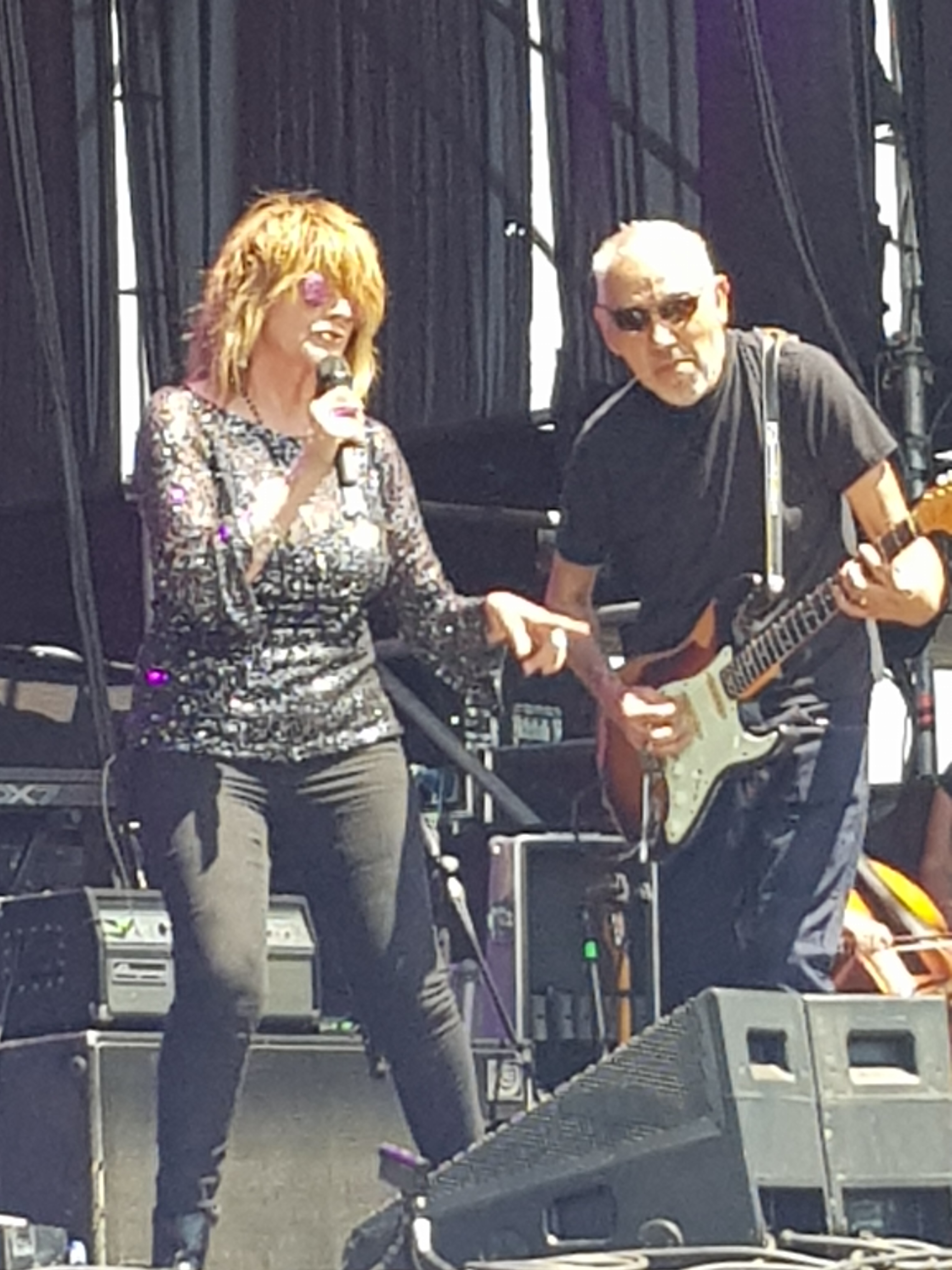
Denise and Carlos Corales

- Denise Corales – vocals
- Carlos Corales – guitar
- Willy Cavada – drums (1968–2013)
- Ricardo Briones – bass (1968–1974)

== Discography ==
=== Albums ===
- 1969 – Aguaturbia
- 1970 – Aguaturbia Vol. 2
- 1970 – Psychedelic Drugstore
- Aguaturbia acoustic version (2010, Milodon)
- Aguaturbia Vol. 2 (2010, Lion records USA)
- 2017 – Fe, amor y libertad

=== Compilations ===
- 1996 – Psychedelic Drugstore
- Aguaturbia Complete Tracks (2000, Runner Records)
- 2010 – Aguaturbia acoustic version
- 2010 – Aguaturbia vol 1 y 2 Vinil Lion Records
