= Cecilia Pantoja =

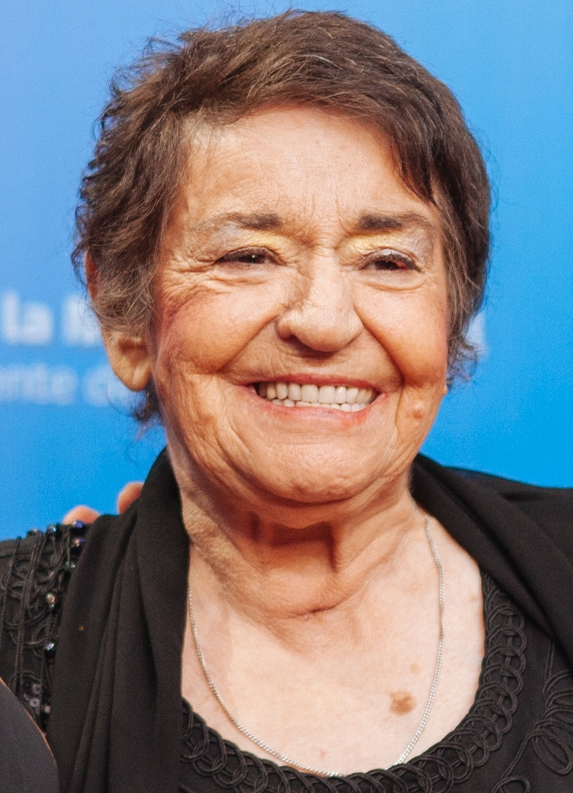
- Pantoja in 2016

Background information
- Also known as: Cecilia, Cecilia la incomparable
- Born: Cecilia Pantoja Levi; 21 October 1943; Tomé, Chile
- Died: 24 July 2023 (aged 79) Santiago, Chile
- Genres: Bolero, mambo, chachachá, italian tango, rock and roll
- Occupation: singer-songwriter
- Years active: 1960–2023

Mireya Cecilia Ramona Pantoja Levi (21 October 1943 – 24 July 2023), better known simply as Cecilia or Cecilia la Incomparable, was a Chilean singer-songwriter, and a member of the nueva ola music movement.

Pantoja was considered by some critics as the greatest teen star of the mid-1960s and the most prominent and influential act of the nueva ola movement.

== Biography ==
=== Beginnings ===
Mireya Cecilia Ramona Pantoja Levi was born in Tomé on 21 October 1943 at 10 pm. She was the daughter of Fernando Pantoja Rubilar and Luisa Levi. She was the youngest of the family made up of her brothers Marietta and Fernando. She attended highschool at Liceo de Tomé. She was called simply as Cecilia, as she was always called by her family and friends.

Cecilia began singing at the end of the 1950s in the band Los de Tomé, a melodic quartet originally formed by three González brothers and whose name is attributed to the city of origin of its members. After the recording of a first and only single disc for the RCA label at the beginning of the 1960s, the group broke up, and she went solo with a vocal support group they baptized The Singers. With them she arrived at the Odeón studios in 1962 to record his first solo work, a single album that by adding its two sides, combines two different musical styles: an Italian tango (one of many) and rock and roll performed in the native language (I wanna live).

=== Early success and decline ===
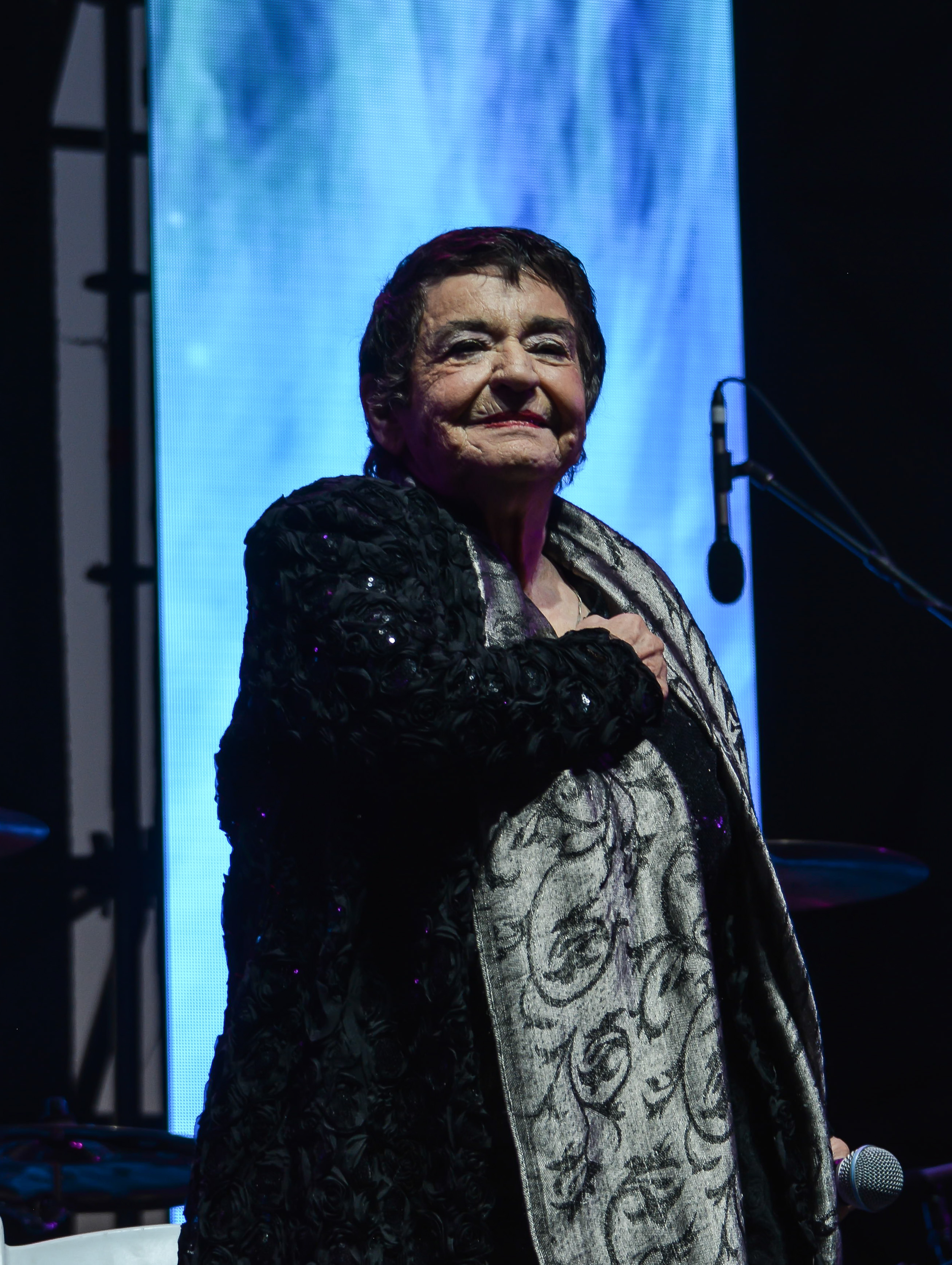
Cecilia at the 2018 Cumbre del Rock Chileno Festival.

A couple of years after her solo debut, driven by Italian tango songs such as Tango de las rosas (1963), Aleluya, and Baño de mar a medianoche (1964), Cecilia achieved popularity. Between the years 1963 and 1965, she led the sales and popularity lists of the press and radio; Her fans flocked to the radio stations, theaters and stadiums where her concerts were held. Her name also led several of the main musical tours organized by the country in those years.

Her stage display was brash and provocative, with a musical catalogue that spanned several musical genres, which would make her a symbol of sexual emancipation by transgressing manners, conventions and customs. In his participation in the 1965 Viña del Mar International Song Festival, she competed with the song Como una ola, entangling herself in a sharp controversy with the authorities of the time for violating the recommendation not to perform his characteristic taquito kiss, a scenic gesture inspired by soccer technique and considered inappropriate to be performed by a woman at the time. She responded with grimaces, mocking gestures and the occasional taquito kiss.

Rubén Nouzeilles, her first musical producer and then artistic director of the Odeón label, had a great influence on her musical and artistic style. He did not agree with the presumed lightness of the Nueva Ola. Her musical training was broad enough to include productions by dissimilar musicians, such as Lucho Gatica, her friend Violeta Parra and Los Huasos Quincheros. Cecilia's recordings that bear Nouzeilles' signature were definitely the most significant of her career, and were characterized by rich orchestrations arranged by Odeón staff directors such as Luis Barragán and Valentín Trujillo.

Cecilia's artistic decline coincided with her removal from the Odeon since the second half of the decade at the hands of new youthful idols, among them José Alfredo Fuentes, in 1968 she decided to move to the CBS/Philips label and start recording songs that would give her career a more adult and international profile. In 1970 she proposed progressive versions for songs by Violeta Parra Gracias a la vida and Víctor Jara Plegaria a un labrador. The most important record of that period was Compromiso, a rock ballad that three decades later would be rescued by Javiera y Los Imposibles. At her time, however, the success of this stylistic experiment was unsatisfactory. After releasing her first and only LP for CBS/Philips, Gracias a la vida (1970), she unsuccessfully tried to start a career in Mexico and on his return amidst government of the Popular Unity, she founded his own record label, Chía Producciones, for which he recorded a few melancholic and romantic songs that had little diffusion.

=== Resurgence as an underground figure ===
By the time of the 1973 Chilean coup d'état she was singing at nightclubs in the capital, and since then, those stages became a refuge for her artistic survival. Unlike other singers of her generation, the former queen of the Nueva Ola remained outside the official and massive broadcast circuits. In the underground of the depressed national bohemia, Cecilia began to rise as a legend for a new generation that began to value her as a cult figure. The first signal in this regard was delivered by the theater director Vicente Ruiz, who in 1984 used songs by Cecilia to musicalize a version of the play Hipólito, which was staged at the El Trolley theater. «She —he declared in December 1984 to the Wikén supplement of the newspaper El Mercurio —is like someone majestic who disappeared into the darkness of anonymity due to a possible self-destruction. All her songs are about love; but of a fatal love, impossible to specify. She is a woman who marginalized herself." Although the production of Hipólito had a very marginal impact, it was the starting point for Cecilia to be revalued among new generations.

Then there was a series of concerts (one of them sold out at the Teatro Caupolicán), with her former artistic director, Leo García. Then Rubén Nouzeilles released two compiled albums in digital format, La incomparable (1995) and Un día te diré (1997), whose sales totaled more than 100 thousand units, revealing the popular roots of the songs.

=== Later recognition ===
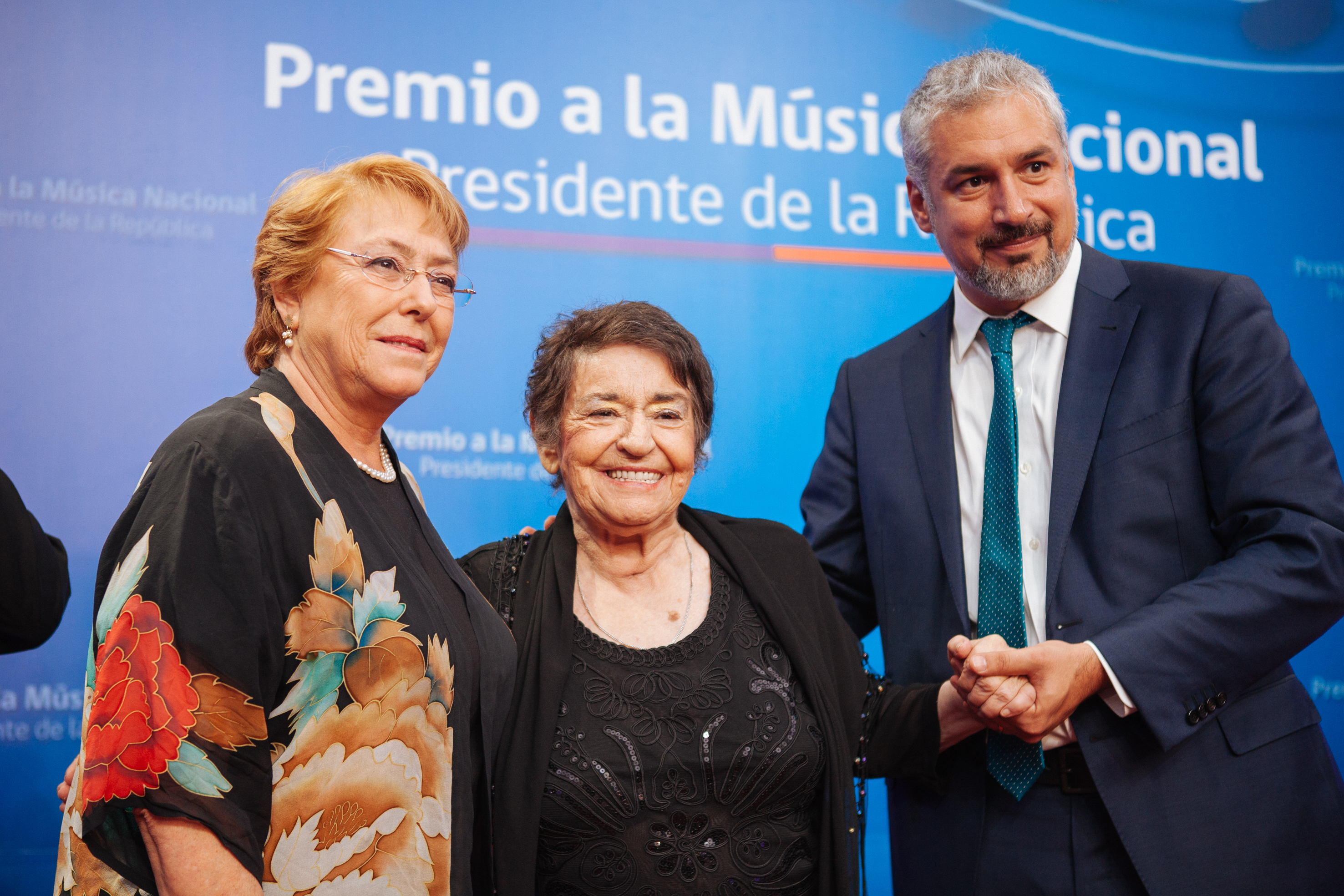
Cecilia receiving the Premio a la Música Nacional Presidente de la República in 2016

At the turn of the century, Cecilia, reina y mito was released, a play about Cecilia's life that touched on the subject of alcoholism and homosexuality, feeding the myth about her figure. The unauthorized biography Cecilia, la vida en llamas (2002, Planet), by Cristóbal Peña also contributed to that. After remaining on sale for a month, the book was seized by order of the First Criminal Court of Santiago, due to a criminal case that sought to evaluate possible advertising injuries accused by Ceciliar in a lawsuit. A year and a half later, the case was closed without the court reaching a ruling on the merits of the claim, because the abandonment of the procedure was decreed, a decision that was later confirmed by the Court of Appeals of Santiago.

For much of her musical career, Cecilia Pantoja Levi -like all the singers of her generation- limited herself to managing her musical heritage from the 1960s. In 2016 she received Premio a la Música Nacional Presidente de la República in popular music, handed by president Michelle Bachelet.

Many artists of younger generations have recognized her influence such as Álvaro Henríquez, Javiera Parra, Denisse Malebran and Mon Laferte among others.

In 2023 a biographic TV series entitled "Cecilia: Bravura Plateada" was broadcast in TVN, starring Amaya Forch as Cecilia.

Cecilia Pantoja died on 24 July 2023, at the age of 79 in Santiago, Chile.

== Discography ==
=== Studio albums ===
- Cecilia (1964)
- Cecilia, la incomparable (1965)
- Estamos solas, guitarra (1968)
- Gracias a la vida (1970)

=== Live albums ===
- Cecilia en vivo (2000)
- Cecilia en concierto: Santiago 2006 (2006)
- Mi historia (en vivo) (2021)

=== Compilations ===
- Cecilia: Sus más grandes éxitos (1980)
- Cecilia: Sus más grandes éxitos II (1982)
- La incomparable (1995)
- Un día te diré (1998)
- Antología 1960–1970 (2002)
