= Tilo González =

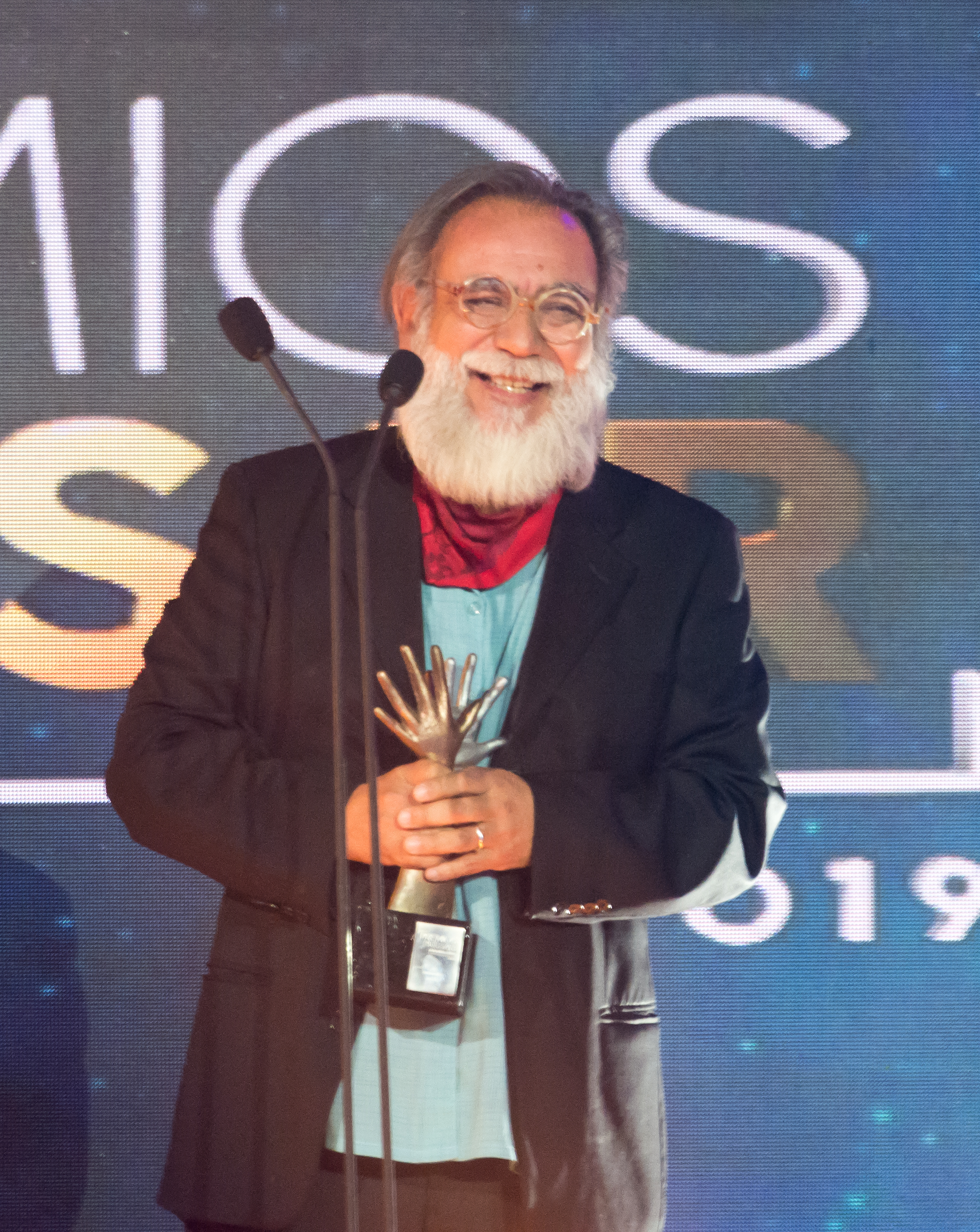
- Tilo in 2019
- Born: Sergio Hernán González Morales, 9 October 1952 (age 73); Quilpué, Chile
- Musical career
- Genres: Folk rock, Progressive rock, Jazz fusion, Contemporary classical music, pop, Latinamerican fusion
- Occupations: composer, drummer, bandleader
- Instruments: drums, percussion, guitar, cuatro
- Years active: 1968–present

Sergio Hernán González Morales, better known as Tilo González (born in Quilpué on October 9, 1952), is a Chilean drummer, percussionist, composer and arranger. Founding member of the prestigious Latin American fusion band Congreso, which he has led for over 50 years. The Rock Workers Association (ATR) recognized him in 1996 as the best drummer in Chile; although he is also one of the most extraordinary composers in the country, which he has demonstrated after a vast career as a composer, arranger and drummer of Congreso since its inception in 1969.

== Biography ==
He began playing spontaneously without even having a drums, he percussed jars, bottles and all kinds of objects until at age 14 his father gave him a drum set. At 17 he suffered the early death of his father, forcing him to have to earn a living prematurely. He entered to study architecture at the University of Valparaíso, then art and then mathematics, until the 1973 Pinochet coup ended all his university aspirations and his youth surrounded by the revolution of flowers and psychedelia. In the 1960s, three musical groups were all the rage at carnivals and schools in the Valparaíso Region; The Masters, The Psychedelics and the High Bass. The Masters was made up of the three González Morales brothers –Patricio, Fernando and Tilo– plus Fernando Hurtado. The Psychedelics emulated The Beatles, led by Frankie, as Francisco Sazo called himself then. And the High Bass was a Viña del Mar group made up of Claudio Parra and Eduardo Parra, Mario Mutis, Gato Alquinta and Gabriel Parra, later renamed as Los Jaivas.

In 1969, and after the merger of Los Masters and Los Sicodélicos, he formed together with his brothers Fernando González and Patricio González plus Francisco Sazo and Fernando Hurtado the group Congreso, a band that sought to mix folk elements with electric instruments derived from rock for a fusion multi-stylistic. They participated in the New Chilean Song Festival due to their rock affiliation, and in 1970 they recorded their first single, with "Maestranzas de Noche", a poem by Pablo Neruda set to music by Fernando González, and "El condor pasa", traditional music with lyrics by Francisco Sazo. In 1971 they released their first album called El Congreso. After several career attempts such as architecture, Sergio found his true academic vocation and moved to Santiago de Chile to study percussion at the Universidad Católica de Chile, with professors such as Guillermo Rifo and Alejandro Guarello. That is where Sergio finds great musical inspirations from composers like the Argentine Alberto Ginastera and the Brazilian Heitor Villa-Lobos. His vast repertoire of compositions includes a very large percentage of the works of Congreso. In Terra Incógnita (1975) he signs "Vuelta y vuelta". In Congreso (1977), "Ruffle of feathers" and the music of "The color of the iguana", "If you go", "Your song", "The elements" and "Rainbow of soot". He is the author of "The derail", "Undosla", "Journey through the crest of the world", "The last flight of the soul" and "The hollow earth" (from Journey through the Crest of the World, 1981); "The last bolero", "Sur", "First procession", "… And then it was born" (from Ha Llegado Carta, 1982), and "Andén del aire", "In the round of a flight", "Voladita nortina", "Invasive wings" and "Down there in the street", from Pájaros de Arcilla (1984). And so, almost all works from the 17 studio albums released by the group.

In the 80's is when Congreso, from the creative hand of Sergio, finds its artistic and technical apogee, with the positive response of a mass public, considering the non-commercial style they work, and the great reception of specialized critics. Records such as Viaje por la Cresta del Mundo, (1981), Ha llegado carta, (1982), Pájaros de arcilla (1984), Estoy que me muero (1986) and Para los arqueólogos del futuro (1989) were recognized all over the music world as a fine fusion between jazz, rock, folklore and contemporary music united in the style called Latin American fusion. He has also been a percussion professor at the Universidad Católica de Valparaíso for more than ten years and between 1986 and 1987 he played jazz-rock in the group Kamereléctrica, led by the violinist Roberto Lecaros.

He also composed the soundtrack for La Última Huella (2001), a documentary by Paola Castillo that deals with the urgency of recording the voices of the sisters Úrsula and Cristina Calderón, the last survivors of the Yaghan people.

Apart from his work in Congreso, Tilo González was the titular drummer of the Viña del Mar International Song Festival Orchestra, between 1994 and 2002, and a drummer of the Horacio Saavedra Orchestra, participating in most of the stars of Channel 13, during the decade ninety and two thousand.

In recent times, in parallel to Congreso, Tilo González has worked alone and with other musicians such as Andrés Márquez, Magdalena Matthey, Alexis Venegas, Quelentaro, Mario Rojas and Marcelo Aedo, and in 2002 he founded the record label Machi to open space to new creators in addition to their own work, their own musical language has made it possible to meet the Latin American world.

Tilo is currently considered one of the best and most established composers in Chile. He currently continues to work with Congreso after more than 50 years since its inception.

== Discography as leader of Congreso ==
=== Studio ===
- 1971 - El Congreso (EMI-ODEON)
- 1975 - Terra Incógnita (EMI-ODEON)
- 1977 - Congreso (EMI-ODEON)
- 1978 - Misa de Los Andes (EMI ODEÓN)
- 1981 - Viaje por la Cresta del Mundo (EMI-ODEON)
- 1982 - Ha Llegado Carta (EMI-ODEON)
- 1984 - Pájaros de Arcilla (CBS Records)
- 1986 - Estoy que me muero... (Alerce)
- 1989 - Para los arqueólogos del futuro (Alerce)
- 1990 - Aire Puro (Alerce)
- 1992 - Los Fuegos del Hielo (Alerce)
- 1992 - Pichanga (Alerce) (Reeditado en 2013)
- 1995 - Por amor al viento (EMI) (Reeditado en 1997)
- 2001 - La loca sin zapatos (MACONDO - SONY MUSIC)
- 2010 - Con los ojos en la calle (MACHI)
- 2013 - Sinfónico (MACHI)
- 2017 - La canción que te debía (MACHI)
- 2022 - Luz de Flash (Machi)

=== Live ===
- 1987 - Gira al Sur (Alerce) (reeditado en 2000 con el nombre "Congreso en vivo")
- 1994 - 25 Años de Música (EMI)
- 2004 - Congreso de Exportación: la historia de un viaje (MACHI)
- 2015 - Legado de Trovadores (Master Music)
- 2018 - En vivo Montreal 1988 (El Templo Records)

=== Recopilations ===
- 1991 - Congreso 71-82 (EMI)
- 1997 - Mediodía (IRIS MUSIC)
- 2005 - Grandes Trovadores (Alerce)
- 2009 - Música y Leyenda

=== DVD ===
- 2012 - Congreso a la carta (MACHI)
