= Alturas de Macchu Picchu =

Studio album by Los Jaivas
- Released: October 1981
- Studio: Pathé Marconi
- Genres: Progressive rock; rock opera; folk rock; Andean music
- Length: 37:08
- Label: SyM
- Producer: Daniel Camino

Los Jaivas chronology
Canción del Sur (1977)	Alturas de Macchu Picchu (1981)	Aconcagua (1982)

Alturas de Macchu Picchu is a studio album by the Chilean rock band Los Jaivas, released in October 1981 on SyM label. It is a concept album that musicalizes the homonymous poem by Chilean poet Pablo Neruda that appeared in his 1950 book Canto General. Prior to its launch, a television special recorded in the ruins of Machu Picchu was presented on Chilean and Peruvian television.

== Background ==
After the release of Canción del Sur in 1977, Los Jaivas along with their team migrated to France and arrived in Paris on March 23 of that year. They spent a season in Biarritz, and in the town of Les Glycines, in the outskirts of Paris, they found a mansion that they would use to live for many years and continue their creative work. During their stay in France, they managed concerts in order to survive. In Buenos Aires they had met the Peruvian producer Daniel Camino Diez Canseco, who had also arrived in Paris. In December 1980, Daniel proposed that they make a concept album to musicalize Alturas de Macchu Picchu, a poem from the 1950 book, Canto General by the Chilean Nobel prize winner, poet Pablo Neruda. He also proposed recording a television special in Machu Picchu.

Los Jaivas initially refused, in response, Camino told them "I'm going to Peru, but I'm going to be in Madrid for a month or so. If you change your mind, here's the phone number where you can reach me". Argentine musician Alberto Ledo mixed the zampoña and delay effects with bird sounds recorded in the garden of the mansion where they lived for "Del Aire Al Aire". It was recorded with the French sound engineer Dominique Strabach before going to the United States. It served as the foundation to begin the creation of Alturas de Macchu Picchu. A few days later, they called Daniel to say they had already started the creation of "La Poderosa Muerte", Camino stated that: "Immediately, I’ll get Machu Picchu with my friend " Mario Mutis, who had left the group aside during the creation of Los Sueños de América (1974) decided to return. At first they planned to include the collaboration of Chabuca Granda and Yma Sumac, however, the album was recorded by Los Jaivas alone.

== Composition ==
For the album, the fragments of Neruda's poem that would be set to music were chosen. In the documentary Los Jaivas cuentan la historia, the band vocalist Eduardo "Gato" Alquinta commented that they were always used to creating the melodies first and then adding the lyrics, however in this case, melodies had to be arranged on a letter already written. As Los Jaivas had never visited Machu Picchu, they used an image of the place to be inspired by the creation of "La Poderosa Muerte", "Antigua América" and "Amor Americano".

== Recording ==
The album was recorded in Paris and during their tours during three months. "La Poderosa Muerte" featured tarka, electric guitar (played by Alquinta), bass, drums, trutruca, minimoog, tubular bells, electric piano and piano. During the recording, he lost his voice completely and following the advice of a singer friend of the band, they called a practitioner from the Boulougne sector, in the suburbs of Paris, where he was recording the song. With his help and the effects of the intravenous injection of sulfur, Alquinta managed to recover his voice and thus sing the song. Alquinta played quena and ocarina in "La Poderosa Muerte" and "Sube a Nacer Conmigo Hermano", he also featured quena in "Águila Sideral".

Mario Mutis played bass and Alquinta played guitar in "Águila Sideral". "Sube a Nacer Conmigo Hermano" was recorded on a tour of Germany with an Italian sound engineer who had been in charge of recording the voices. The main riff of the song was created from a minimoog used by Claudio Parra, Alquinta used the Gibson Les Paul Standard acoustic guitar, the Rickenbacker bass, a Venezuelan cuatro, and zampoña. Most of the songs were recorded at Pathé Marconi studios, with the participation of technician Daniel Michle. By July 1981, the album was complete.

== Artwork ==
The album has two covers, one showing the sacred Intihuatana stone designed by René Olivares, and another where a dancer with the Bolivian mask and a ball in his hand is shown.

== Release ==
Before its release, they toured since August to September 1981. On August 7, 15 and 16, they offered a recital at the Obras stadium. Other presentations were made in various cities of the country, all with great box office and critical success. Camino called them to confirm that the Peruvian president, Fernando Belaúnde, had allowed them to hold their television special in Machu Picchu. At first it was planned to have more artists apart from Los Jaivas, however this was not carried out. For the arrival in Machu Picchu, more than thirty people uploaded instruments that would be used in the concert, Claudio Parra's piano was transported through a helicopter.

It was filmed in September 1981 in Machu Picchu and they occupied the locations in the spaces free of tourists between 9 in the morning and 6 in the evening. It was narrated by Peruvian writer Mario Vargas Llosa and was presented on Chilean television by Canal 13 of the Pontifical Catholic University on October 8, 1981, it also was emitted on Peruvian television and radio. Alturas de Macchu Picchu was released in October 1981 on SyM label, owned by the duo Sonia y Myriam. In November, they made a presentation full of lights in Lima, Peru. When the group returned to Chile, they presented three concerts with a large audience at the Teatro Caopolicán, Santiago. At the San Carlos de Apoquindo stadium, the 40th anniversary of the album's release was celebrated on December 11, 2021.

== Reception ==
Retrospective reviews have been generally positive. NaciónRock's Gonzalo Ugarte C. wrote that it "represents the result of experimentation as a constant creative process and how it became the backbone of a group that gave this column a body, forming an amazing, sublime sound that returns the listener to the throbbing American land." The Progressive Subway said: "They managed to create a unique and timeless sound that one could describe as Andes prog. In their warm and happy sound electric guitars and Fender rhodes go hand in hand with a plethora of traditional instruments." In 2006, Al Borde place it as the twenty-fourth most important album of Ibero-American Rock. It was considered the second best Chilean album of all time by Rolling Stone in 2008. It's placed in the position 23 of the “Los 600 de Latinoamérica” list.

== Track listing ==
Side one

1. "Del Aire Al Aire" — 2:17
2. "La Poderosa Muerte" — 11:12
3. "Amor Americano" — 5:28

Side two

1. "Águila Sideral" — 5:22
2. "Antigua América" — 5:38
3. "Sube a Nacer Conmigo Hermano" — 4:46
4. "Final" — 2:37

== Personnel ==
Adapted from the liner notes of the 1995 reissue.

- Eduardo "Gato" Alquinta – lead vocals, electric guitar, bass, classic guitar, quena, zampoña, ocarina
- Mario Mutis – bass, electric guitar, quena, zampoña, backing vocals
- Eduardo Parra Pizarro – electric piano, minimoog, tarka
- Claudio Parra – piano, harpsichord, electric piano, minimoog
- Gabriel Parra – drums, bombo legüero, xylophone, trutruca, tarka, backing vocals
