= Parra =

Parra (Hebrew: גפן) is a Spanish, Portuguese, and also Jewish surname, meaning grapevine or trellis, for example, a pergola. It is taken from the word meaning latticework and the vines raised on it. In Hebrew context the surname is used for Jewish people whose ancestors were wine makers as "Parra" (גפן "Geffen") is the Hebrew word in Spanish for vitis.

== Etymology and history ==
Among Sephardi Jews, the surname is a toponymic from the town of La Parra, Badajoz in Spain, where there was a large Jewish community before their expulsion from the Crowns of Castile and Aragon by the Alhambra Decree in 1492. Many descendants with the surname, some of them converso, went into exile in Portugal and the Netherlands, especially in Amsterdam. In Spain, numerous conversions took place, which is why the surname appears on the lists of the Catholic Church and the Inquisition. It is believed that the origin of the surname lies in the symbolism of the vine and the grapevine, which for the Jewish people means the People of Israel that grows and multiplies. Thus the fields of vines were called "fields of roses" because Israel was the "mystical rose".

At the beginning of the 19th century in the city of Buda, in Hungary, more than half a thousand Sephardic Jews were listed with the surname Parra.

== People with the surname ==
- Ana Milagros Parra, Venezuelan political scientist
- Ángel Parra (judoka) (born 1983), Spanish judoka
- Beatriz Parra Durango (born 1940), Ecuadorian soprano
- Carlos Parra (disambiguation)
- Carolina Parra (born 1978), Brazilian musician
- Derek Parra (born 1970), American speed skater
- Dori Parra de Orellana (1923-2007), Venezuelan politician
- Fabio Parra (born 1959), Colombian road cyclist
- Facundo Parra (born 1985), Argentine footballer
- Francisco Parra Capó (1871 – c. 1945), mayor of Ponce, Puerto Rico
- Francisco Parra Duperón (1827–1899), Puerto Rican lawyer and banker
- Gabriel Parra (1947–1988), Chilean drummer of the folk group Los Jaivas
- Gerardo Parra (born 1987), Venezuelan baseball player
- Ibán Parra (born 1977), Spanish footballer
- Joaquín Parra (born 1961), Spanish footballer
- John Parra (born 1974), Colombian road cyclist
- José Parra (baseball) (born 1972), Dominican baseball player
- José Parra Martínez (1925–2016), Spanish footballer
- Juanita Parra (born 1970), Chilean drummer of the folk group Los Jaivas, daughter of Gabriel
- Lorenzo Parra (born 1978), Venezuelan flyweight boxer
- Manny Parra (born 1982), Mexican-American baseball player
- Marco Parra (footballer) (born 1985), Mexican footballer
- Marco Parra Sánchez (born 1969), Peruvian politician
- Mauricio Parra (born 1990), Venezuelan footballer
- Morgan Parra (born 1988), French rugby player
- Sofanor Parra (1850–1925), Chilean military
- Parra family, Chilean family known for its many artists
  - Violeta Parra (1917–1967), Chilean folk singer
  - Nicanor Parra (1914–2018), Chilean mathematician and poet, brother of Violeta
  - Roberto Parra Sandoval (1921–1995), Chilean folk singer, brother of Violeta
  - Ángel Parra (1943–2017), Chilean folk singer, son of Violeta
  - Isabel Parra (born 1939), Chilean folk singer, daughter of Violeta
  - Catalina Parra (born 1940), Chilean artist, daughter of Nicanor
  - Colombina Parra (born 1970), Chilean rock musician and singer, daughter of Nicanor
  - Javiera Parra (born 1968), Chilean rock musician and singer, granddaughter of Violeta

=== de la Parra ===
- Adolfo de la Parra (born 1946), Mexican drummer, member of Canned Heat
- Alondra de la Parra (born 1980), Mexican conductor, sister of Mane
- Emoé de la Parra (born 1955), Mexican actress and academic, aunt of Alondra and Mane
- Mane de la Parra (born 1982), Mexican singer and actor, brother of Alondra
- Marco Antonio de la Parra (born 1952), Chilean psychiatrist, writer, and dramatist
- Pim de la Parra (1940–2024), Surinamese-Dutch film director
- Teresa de la Parra (1889–1936), Venezuelan novelist

== See also ==
- Laparra, a list of people with the surname
