= Héctor Parra =

Chilean footballer and manager (1891–1968)

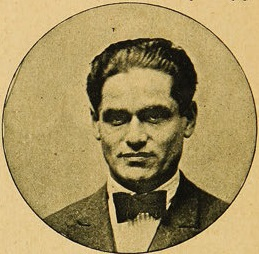

Personal information
- Full name: Héctor Ovidio Parra Cancino
- Date of birth: 10 August 1891
- Place of birth: Chillán, Chile
- Date of death: 14 December 1968 (aged 77)
- Place of death: Chile
- Position: Centre-half

Youth career
- 1906: Industrial F.C.
- 1907: Escuela de Artes y Oficios

Senior career*
Years	Team	Apps	(Gls)
1908–1913	Gimnástico F.C.		
1911	Santiago (city team)	1	(0)
1914	America-RJ		
1915	Flamengo	11	(0)

International career
1913	Chile		

Managerial career
- 1919: Chile
- * Club domestic league appearances and goals

Héctor Ovidio Parra Cancino (10 August 1891 – 14 December 1968) was a Chilean football player and manager who played as a centre-half-back.

== Playing career ==
=== Early career ===
While studying in secondary school, Parra was with both Industrial Football Club from Chillán (1906) and the team of Escuela de Artes y Oficios (1907) from Santiago.

=== In Chile ===
In 1908, Parra joined Gimnástico Football Club of the Asociación de Football de Santiago, winning the Copa Unión (First Division) three times: 1909, 1910, 1912. In addition, he played for the Santiago team in intercity matches versus the Valparaíso team in 1910 and 1911.

=== In Brazil ===
In 1914, Parra joined America-RJ after having played with the Chile national team in Rio de Janeiro the year before, becoming the first Chilean footballer to play abroad. In 1915, he moved to Flamengo, becoming the second foreign player in the club after the English Lawrence Selton Andrews, who was one of the club founders from Fluminense and the first Chilean to play for Flamengo. He made eleven total appearances and won the 1915 Campeonato Carioca, the second title for the club. The Brazilian press described him as a centre-half-back, an older version of the sweeper position.

In addition, he could have played for the Rio de Janeiro team versus both Italy and Exeter City, according to the Chilean journalist Edgardo Marín.

=== International ===
In September 1913, the Chile national team went to Brazil with Parra as a left-back and the team captain, with the support of Federación Sportiva Nacional (FSN), one of the two football federations of Chile at that time. Chile played several matches in both Rio de Janeiro and São Paulo. In Rio de Janeiro Chile faced the team of Escola de Guerra e Marinha (War and Navy School) (loss), a team of Brazilian students (loss), two Carioca squads (1–2 and 0–6 losses) and America-RJ (3–2 win). In São Paulo Chile faced two Paulista squads (2–1 and 3–1 wins) and Americano FC (3–3 draw).

== Coaching career ==
He coached Chile in the 1919 South American Championship, losing the three matches: 0–6 versus Brazil, 0–2 versus Uruguay, 1–4 versus Argentina. Despite he made no appearances, he was actually part of the squad as a player too.

== Personal life ==
Parra was born in Chillán and his parents were Juan de Dios Parra Gutiérrez, a merchant farmer, and Ana María Cancino, a housewife.

In the 1940s, he worked as Consul of Chile in Buenos Aires, Argentina.

According to the members of the artistic collective Las Parrunas, whose surname is Parra and that investigate their family tree, Héctor Parra was the grandfather of the founders of the prolific Chilean music band Los Jaivas: Eduardo, Claudio and Gabriel Parra.

== Honours ==
Gimnástico F.C.

- Copa Unión (First Division of Asociación de Football de Santiago) (3): 1909, 1910, 1912

Flamengo

- Campeonato Carioca (1): 1915
