= Congreso =

Chilean band

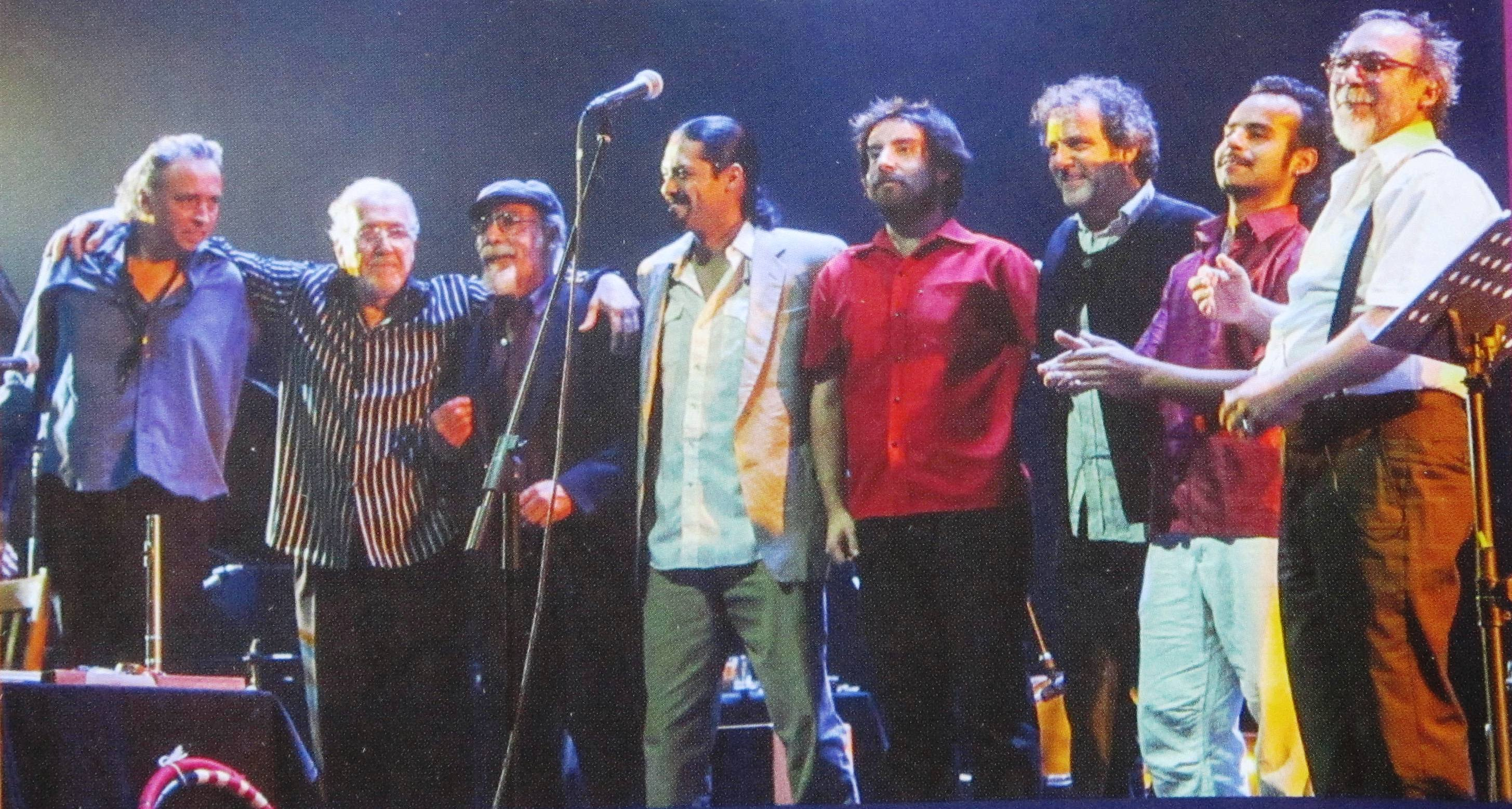
- Congreso in 2012, at the "Congreso a la carta" concert.

Background information
- Origin: Quilpué, Chile
- Genres: Folk, folk rock, contemporary classical music, avant-garde, world, jazz fusion, progressive rock, pop, Latin music
- Years active: 1969–present
- Labels: EMI-Odeon, Sony Music, Sello Alerce, CBS Records, MACHI.
- Members: Current members: Sergio "Tilo" González; Francisco "Pancho" Sazo; Hugo Pirovic; Jaime Atenas; Raúl Aliaga; Sebastiàn Almarza; Federico Fauré

Congreso (lit. 'Congress') is a musical band from Chile. Founded in 1969 in Quilpué, the band has been highly acclaimed with over 50 years in Latin American music.

Congreso is one of the most important bands in the history of Chilean music, both for its refined musical compositions with lyrics of social and ethnic content, as well as for the good reception of the national and international public and critics. Formed together with Los Jaivas and Los Blops, it was one of the cornerstones in the new Chilean progressive sound and the 'Chilenization of Rock' between the mid 60s and early 70s.

They began their career in the late 1960s linked to the New Chilean Song movement, however with the advent of the military dictatorship and cultural constraints of the time, added to the great instrumental vocation of its members, they evolved into a progressive rock style, and later to a fusion sound that incorporated elements also from jazz fusion, contemporary music, pop music, and world music, in a style named by them as The New Latinamerican Music.

The main composer, leader of the band, and drummer is Sergio "Tilo" González, and the lyricist and singer is Francisco "Pancho" Sazo. Both are founding members alongside Tilo's brothers and ex-members Fernando and Patricio, and Fernando Hurtado.

The band currently includes Tilo Gonzalez, Pancho Sazo, and Raul Aliaga (percussion), Sebastián Almarza (piano), Federico Faure (bass), Jaime Atenas (sax), and Hugo Pirovic (flutes). Tilo's son, Simón González, is a recurring guest member as guitarist.

They have made extensive touring for North America, Europe and Latin America.

== History ==
=== Beginnings as a folk rock band (1969–1978) ===
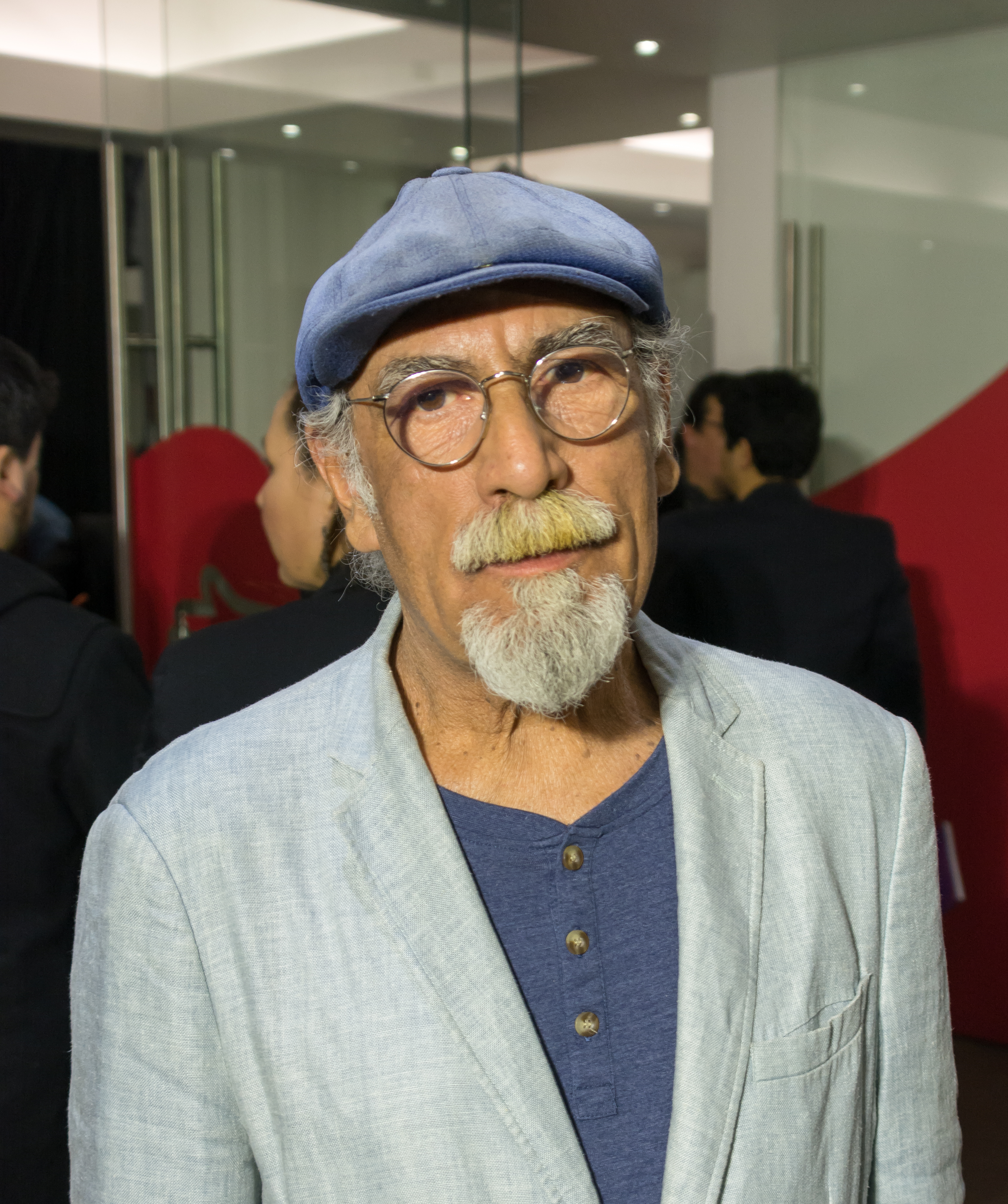
Pancho Sazo in 2019. Singer and founding member.

Congreso roots are in 1964, the year they started working in Quilpué (today part of Greater Valparaíso) on the core of the three Gonzalez brothers: Patricio, Sergio and Fernando, alongside bassist Fernando Hurtado. In school, they formed rock bands like The Stereos, The Shadows and finally, Los Masters. During this period they devoted themselves to instrumental covers of rock songs in English.

Parallel to Los Jaivas, towards 1969 they began to experiment with indigenous instruments. With the addition of bassist and singer Francisco Sazo, from the beat band Los Sicodélicos, the band had finished its lineup and from then, they decided to call themselves Congreso. Then, the origins of Congreso are a mixture of these two groups, influenced like many of their generation by the pop rock of The Beatles. However, the new Latinamericanist ideas geared the quintet toward a new style of rock bands as outlined by Los Jaivas in Viña del Mar and Los Blops in Santiago. This rock with folk influences describes the band's earliest songs of 1969, mainly made with recorders, andean aerophones and charangos, as well as pop rhythms like in the song "Vamos andando mi amigo", an example of the hippie movement in the region.

In 1971 they released El Congreso, their first album, which included a song based on the poem by Pablo Neruda "Maestranzas de noche" and other classics, using a formula that led them to a show at the Festival of the Nueva Canción Chilena that year (at the Teatro Municipal de Santiago). Later, the Gonzalez brothers decided to begin their studies at the Institute of Music of the Universidad Católica, which slowed down their group work, though without interrupting their live performances.

The 1973 Chilean coup d'état cut soon the process of recording their second album, Terra Incognita, only released two years later and with a limited spread, given the closure of cultural spaces. The band did not give up, and became one of the few groups who continued to work in Chile during the early years of the dictatorship. Fusion music and almost cryptic lyrics were their codes to survive the rigorous state surveillance, like in the song "Arcoiris de hollín": "Cuatro jinetes negros / pasan volando / Van levantando noche / niebla y espanto" ("Four black Horsemen / fly by / raising night / fog and fear"), included in the album Congreso in 1977, also sometimes referred to as "brown album" and in clear reference to the Military junta. Two years later they recorded La Misa de los Andes, which was not widely distributed and preceded the first group break up when three members, Fernando Hurtado, Renato Vivaldi and vocalist and lyricist Francisco Sazo, is leaving the group. The latter traveling to Belgium for a PhD in philosophy.

=== Member changes and shift to progressive rock (1979–1984) ===
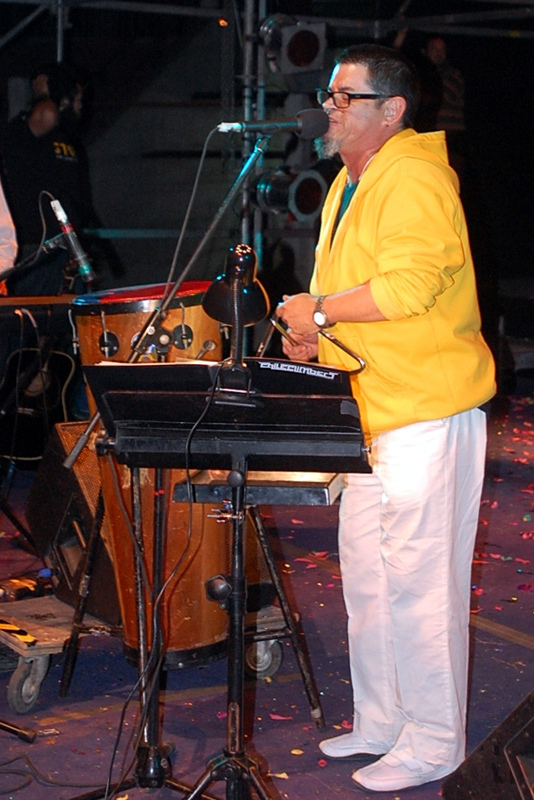
Joe Vasconcellos worked as a leader singer between 1980 and 1984. Here he is in 2011.

The exit of part of the band reduced the power of the group in the middle of the dictatorship, but the protest songs were cleverly camouflaged with poetic lyrics and musical complexities. The three Gonzalez brothers took over a year to reassemble the group while they kept working as support musicians in television orchestras and pop musicians like the Argentine pianist Raúl di Blasio. That's how they met the young Chilean-Brazilian Joe Vasconcellos, whose latinamericanist interests and his musical training, they thought, would give a new look to the project. Beside him, the recently integrated pianist Anibal Correa and bassist Ernesto Holman, (who not only was an old acquaintance of Tilo Gonzalez, but would also become one of the most representatives of the new fusion sound of the group) completed the reshaping of Congreso.

Vasconcellos then assumed as a lyricist, and with that scheme published Viaje por la cresta del mundo in 1981, one of the band's strongest works, with some of the most complex compositions by Tilo such as "Viaje por la cresta del mundo", "Hijo del diluvio" or "El descarril". However, public recognition would come with the inclusion of a simple song, the classic "Hijo del sol luminoso" written by Joe Vasconcellos. Congreso then gave a clear shift towards progressive rock, though always keeping a Latin American style.

Moving between the stages of the Nueva Canción Chilena, rock spaces that opened in those years, and college circuits, Congreso consolidated in this new context as a fundamental band of the Chilean scene. Their album Ha llegado carta (1983) roamed many scenarios, and the band was hired by CBS-Argentina to record a new production. Vasconcellos left the band, and the group focused its repertoire on instrumentals, which gave life to Pájaros de arcilla (sometimes considered the group's magnum opus) in 1984. In this year saxophonist Jaime Atenas joined the band from the group Ensemble Jazz-Fusion. Even though pájaros was critically acclaimed, it was never edited in Chile, which made them distance themselves from their local audience, generating a crisis that was settled shortly when Sazo (now with a PhD) returned after years of study in Europe.

=== Return of Sazo and democracy (1985–1990) ===
A new album would refresh the style of the group: Estoy que me muero (1986), returning to a more popular style, now with lyrics written by Sazo. Moreover, drummer Sergio "Tilo" Gonzalez, band leader, had recruited two young musicians from the band Fulano: keyboardist Jaime Vivanco and electric bassist Jorge Campos, giving a boost to the group. Congreso was aimed at merging with fine touches of jazz while still maintaining their style, with songs like "Súbete a la vereda", "La isla del tesoro" y "Calipso intenso, casi azul" among others. With a renewed lineup, Congreso toured Chile in 1987. As a result of that tour came the double cassette Gira al sur, which was distinguished by its emphasis on dance rhythms, bright songs and colorful staging, with which the band garnered all the fame scattered in twenty years of history.

The song "Calypso intenso, casi azul" was the emblem of the new stage, and the development and popularity coincided with the 1988 referendum that marked the exit of Augusto Pinochet from La Moneda, and the Chilean transition to democracy. In this context, Congreso edited Para los arqueólogos del futuro (1989), an album with some of the fastest-paced rhythms in the band's history, and in which they sang about racial freedom, they played, ironized and deployed all of their instrumental resources. According to Sazo, the album "touches on the ability to forget in Latin America, which ends with the dead, especially with those of this era." Songs like "En todas las esquinas" or "El trapecista" reached high radial diffusion, especially the former which became one of the iconic themes of the arrival of democracy. The album was the first in the group's history to reach the category of "gold" (for 15,000 copies sold). Congreso retained the formula on the next disc, Aire Puro (1990), but the mass echo was, this time, more moderate. The success of this period include themes that echoed those living with passion the Chilean transition to democracy, like in the song "Aire puro", which allowed them to participate in the legendary concert Desde Chile... un abrazo a la esperanza of Amnesty International in 1990 alongside renowned international artists such as Sinéad O'Connor, Sting, Peter Gabriel, New Kids on the Block, Jackson Browne, Luz Casal, Wynton Marsalis, Rubén Blades, and Inti-Illimani, among others.

=== Concept albums (1991–1994) ===
Two concept albums of high musical development but little public reception were their next works, both published in 1992. Pichanga was developed a work based on poems by Nicanor Parra, based on the Convention on the Rights of the Child, which involved institutions like UNICEF, Raddabarnen of Sweden, Terranova of Italy, and the Ministry of Education of Chile. Fuegos del hielo was composed for a modern ballet, in a classical style, referring to the extinction of the ethnic groups of the far south of Chile such as Alacalufes, Aonikenk, Yaganes and Selkʼnam. The work was exhibited at Teatro Municipal de Santiago as well as in the Festival of Italica in Seville, Spain, and the Opera of Budapest, in Hungary, among many other places in the old continent. Each of these works was too complex for the general public, confirming the limited commercial reception of Congreso. Although the group moved away from rankings and charts, it kept a small but loyal public. Dedicated to each of their musical projects separately, the members of the band slowed down the creation of music until 1994, when, through 25 años de música (a live album, with featured guests like Isabel Parra, Inti- Illimani, Eduardo Gatti, Argentine León Gieco and several former members of the group), reviewed its history of more than four hours of uninterrupted music.

=== The new Latin American music and Vivanco's death (1995–2003) ===
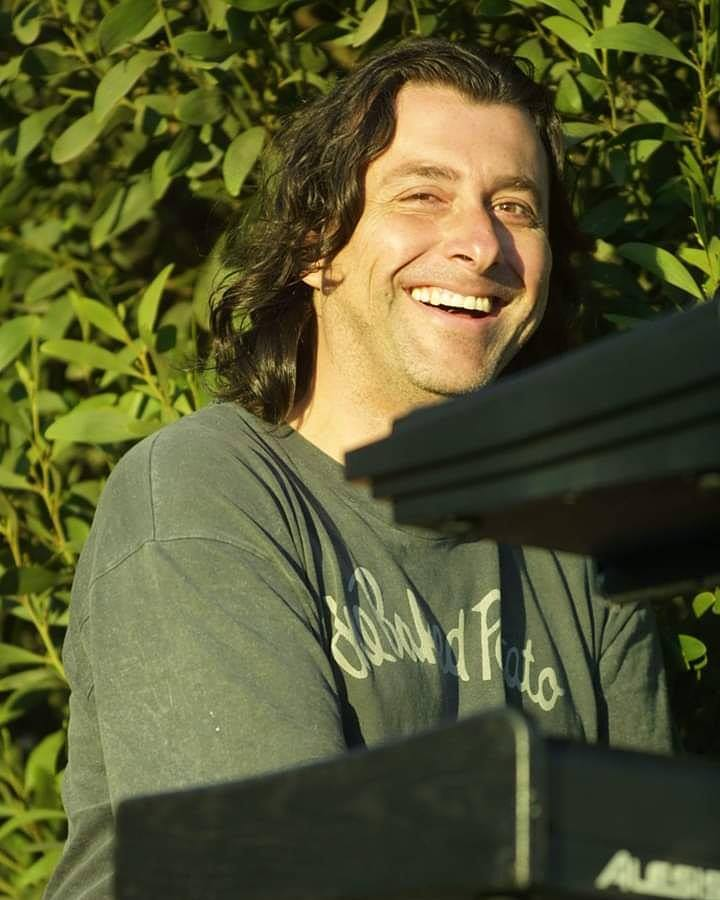
Jaime Vivanco pianist of the band from 1986 until his death in 2003.

Two years after the live album, Congreso recorded two new original works in 1997: Por amor al viento and Mediodía. The first was released independently, due to the poor relationship the band had by then developed with record labels, and in a year that brought great but not massive impact. Mediodía, meanwhile, included live shots for some of its strongest songs.

From the 1990s onwards, many of the most emblematic members of Congreso developed musical projects in parallel. Tilo Gonzalez worked as a producer of Magdalena Matthey and musicalized documentaries. Jaime Atenas worked with the Cuarteto Latinoamericano de Saxophones, Jaime Vivanco and Jorge Campos continued working on Fulano, while the latter also leads several projects of experimental rock and jazz fusion. Because each member had musical work separately, the recording for the next album delayed.

In 2001, and with 32 years of existence, the band decided to release a new album inaugurating a different stage: La loca sin zapatos. It proved to be an excellent opportunity for a new encounter with the group and its public. Sazo's work in this album is remarkable in that he was still doing great lyrics like "Pasillo de amor", a slower song, in the line of "Nocturno" which tells the love story of a prostitute and client. The album also includes a version of "Angelita Huenuman" of Victor Jara, who had already appeared in the immortal artist tribute album, and "Farewell", with texts by Pablo Neruda's work that belongs to "The poets of Chile". By then, EMI had expired contract with Tilo and the relationship was very strained. Under this situation, Tilo Gonzalez creates his own recording studio and label to enter the wave of self-management. Thus he made his production "Macondo" and independent label "Macchi" which debuts the new album and is distributed by Sony Music. For years, all the albums belonged to EMI and Alerce.

And comes the fateful year of 2003. While in the capital Estacion Mapocho was watching the remains of Eduardo "Gato" Alquinta, other news shook the music world: Jaime Vivanco (only 42 years old), composer and keyboardist of Congreso and Fulano, among other groups, was found dead at his home commune Recoleta on January 17. In the wake, "Tilo" Gonzalez, noticeably affected, said: "Right now there is nothing to say, I am very sad, desolate.It's a blow we feel very strongly." After this hard moment, Tilo decides the name of Jaime's replacement a few months after the fact: Sebastian Almarza.

=== Reformation and touring (2004–2011) ===
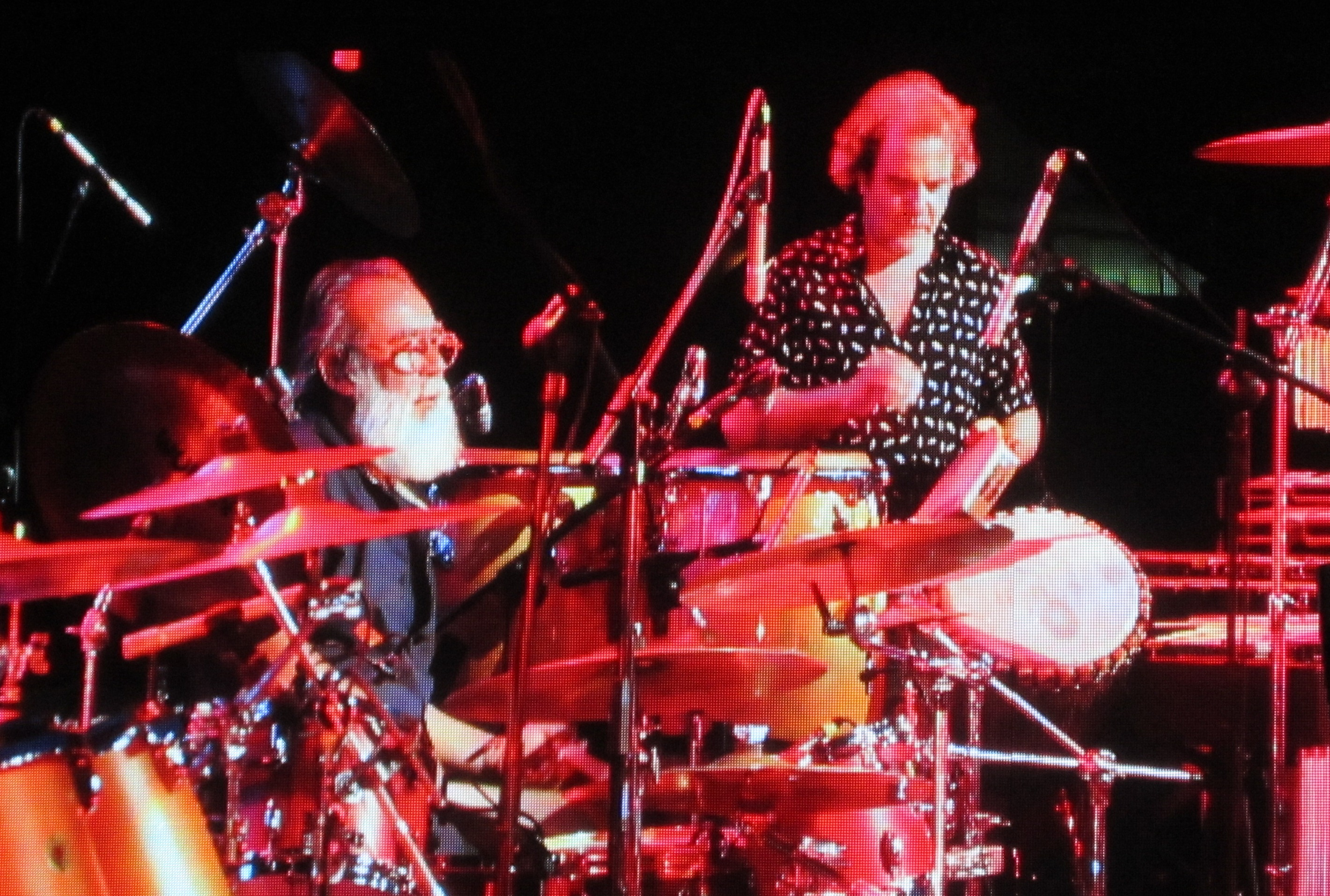
Tilo González (left), founder member, lead composer, and drummer, along with Raúl Aliaga, percussionist.

Given the low coverage of the music of Congreso in Chile, the group decided to seek better fortune abroad. Congreso launched a tour in the United States with encouraging proposals including participation in an international jazz festival and the ability to distribute their complete discography in North America. It was then that the group finally began its international fame, playing in college circuits in the U.S. and in scenarios of "world music". There they won a new space, which Congreso continued to explore for many years. They gave concerts, jam sessions and even lectures in the states of Montana, Nebraska, Texas, California and Louisiana. Notable is the participation of Jorge Campos, who spoke about technique in the Jazz Institute of Music the University of California at Berkeley, and the intervention of Hugo Pirovic at Myrna Loy Center in a talk on flutes and ethnic instruments. So, a reporter on one of the tours to the United States described his surprise when he realized that Congreso's complete records were transmitted on the radio in New Orleans, as was the case of La loca con zapatos and Los fuegos del hielo.

The group continued on this path, and two years after the last album, released another live album Congreso de exportación, with the record being submitted to dash back at Teatro Oriente. The call showed that the band, despite the remoteness of the mass media has a significant and loyal following. Congreso de exportación, alludes playfully as Tilo, to trade agreements with Europe and the United States, and also to their next trip. The band's international reputation is echoed in Chile, so they are invited to participate in the XLVI International Song Festival of Viña del Mar. Congreso passes a good time thanks to their renowned live CD, winning an Altazor Awards.

On Saturday, June 18, 2006, Jorge Campos left Congreso. The show the next Saturday night at the Teatro Oriente in Santiago was his farewell to the Chilean public and Congreso. The new professional and musical challenges, required him to leave Congreso to act on new solo projects in England before returning to Fulano in 2009. The event reached 1,200 people, which filled the venue where the bassist played for the last time, before traveling to settle in the UK. After the successful presentation of farewell, Congreso began a small tour in Europe that led to the set to Paris and Brussels. Federico Faure is called by Tilo to be part of the new lineup of Congreso.

In 2007, the group performed a memorable concert at the Centro Cultural Estación Mapocho which brought together all the members that were once part of Congreso since its inception in 1969, except for Jorge Campos. In December 2009 a concert was performed for the band's 40 year anniversary with the symphony orchestra of the Teatro Municipal de Santiago directed by Edward Browne, as well as with the symphony orchestra of Antofagasta in the Ruins of Huanchaca. These consisted of orchestral concerts, which will be reflected on a new album which was released in 2014. After nine years away from the recording studio, in July 2010, launched on the market Con los ojos en la calle as a result of this way back to the stage. The album features songs by Tilo González and Francisco Sazo, and guests such as Brazilian Lenine and Ed Motta, plus the Chilean singer Magdalena Matthey.

=== Reinterpretations and new album (2012–2018) ===
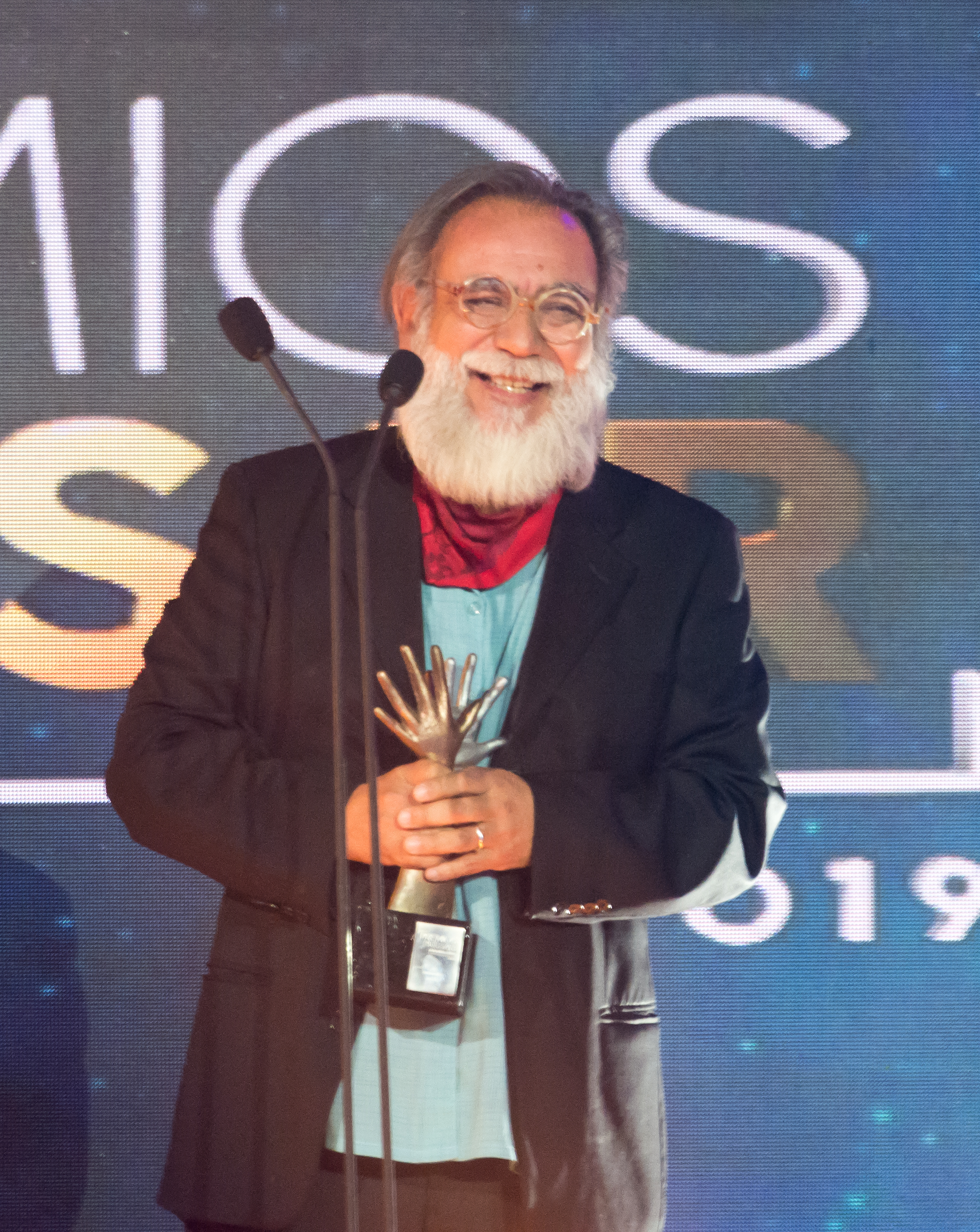
Tilo González in 2019, composer, drummer and founder member receiving a Pulsar Award for best 2017 album.

In April 2012, Congreso made a double concert at the Cultural Center Matucana 100, made from an online vote of 20–23 selecting songs rated out of 70. The concert was recorded and filmed for DVD. Finally the release of the DVD entitled Congreso a la carta was held on September in a concert at the Teatro Oriente, becoming the most important audiovisual work of the band.

In January 2014, the project "Congreso Sinfónico" (Symphonic Congreso), finally goes on sale on CD after four years of live performances celebrating the 40 years of the group, performed together with the symphony orchestra of the Teatro Municipal de Santiago directed by Eduardo Browne, as also with the orchestra of the University of Concepción in the homonymous city, as many other orchestras around the country. These concerts consisted of orchestral arrangements from the classical repertoire of Congreso.

On July 26, 2013, they re-release the album Pichanga: Antipoemas by Nicanor Parra to 21 years of its original edition with a concert in Matucana 100. In the same line, in April 2014 the group performed the album Pájaros de Arcilla, celebrating 30 years of its launch in Argentina. The album was never presented in Chile despite being considered one of the masterpieces of the band given the quality and execution of the compositions.

In March 2015, they released the single El fin del show at the Lollapalooza Chile concert, included in the compilation album Legado de trovadores, and as a preview of their next studio album.

Continuing with the reinterpretations, the group presented the album Terra Incógnita (1975) in July 2016, due to its re-release in vinyl record format. They also announce the release of their new studio album, entitled La canción que te debía, for the next few months.

On January 5, 2017, they perform at the Rockodromo 2017 for the first time playing together in stage with Los Jaivas, at Sotomayor Square in Valparaíso, also celebrating the 100th anniversary of Violeta Parra, in more than 3 hours of music that featured the presence of 15,000 attendees.

On November 25, 2017, the new album entitled La canción que te debía (The song that owed you), was finally released in a double concert at the Teatro Oriente in Santiago. They also premiered the video clip of the song Premio de consuelo for YouTube, which adds to the theme Fin del show premiered some time ago. The presentation included the participation of lyric singer Pamela Flores, and Simón González on guitar, son of Tilo. It features the intense song entitled A las yeguas del apocalipsis (To the mares of the apocalypse) in tribute to Pedro Lemebel. At the same time, the book Los Elementos: voces y asedios al grupo Congreso of Rodrigo Pincheira, was launched, becoming the first literary work entirely dedicated to the band.

=== 50th anniversary celebration (2019–present) ===
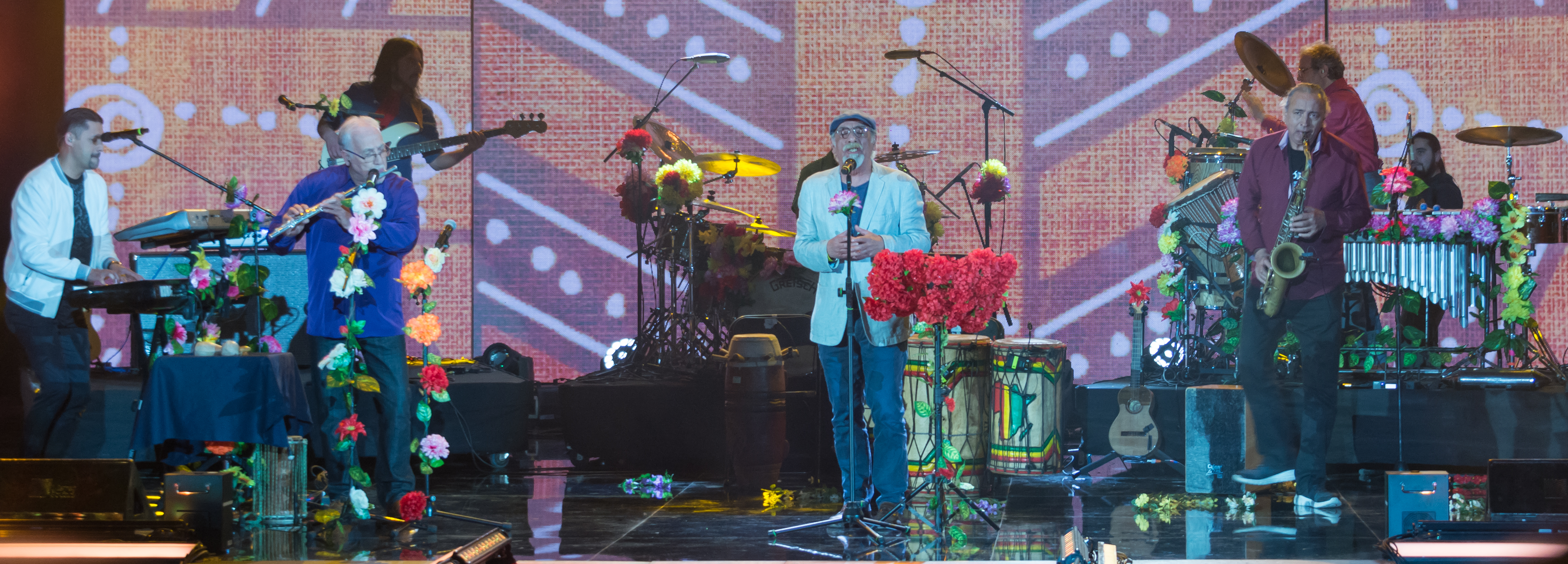
Congreso performing in 2019.

In 2019 for the celebration of the 50th anniversary of the founding of the band, a tour entitled Congreso en Todas las Esquinas is intended, with the ambitious plan to present 50 recitals throughout the country. These began in January at Teatro Municipal de Las Condes and at the festival La Cumbre.

On Saturday, April 27, 2019, they performed at the Juan Bustos Ramírez Municipal Theater (Former Teatro Velarde) at his native Quilpué, to celebrate part of its five decades of history and, at the same time, the 121st anniversary of the commune, where In addition, the historical members of the band Sergio "Tilo" González, Fernando González, Patricio González, Francisco "Pancho" Sazo, Fernando Hurtado and Hugo Pirovich were recognized as Illustrious Citizens of the city, in a concert with sold out tickets and had a strong presence of family and friends.

On August 24 they celebrated in the Teatro Caupolicán in Santiago the exact 50 years since their first formal concert at the Velarde Theater in Quilpué. The concert began with videos of greetings and stories of fans of the band, among which some cultural figures such as Claudio Parra, Bororo, and Pedro Aznar stood out. The musical repertoire toured all its history and discography with special guests for each period of the band, bringing together the founders in the first formation of the 70s'; Fernando González Morales, Patricio González, and Fernando Hurtado. To the band of the 80's; Joe Vasconcellos, Ernesto Holman, and Ricardo Vivanco. In the 90's with Jorge Campos, Pajarito Araya, and audiovisual references to Jaime Vivanco. In relation to their last decade they invited Magdalena Matthey and Simón González. Other guests were Isabel Parra, and Banda Conmoción. The concert lasted more than four hours and 44 songs were performed, and also had puppet interventions, dancers (ballet and afro), and permanent audiovisual support also touring its art and concept. The audience excitedly supported the master recital at all times.

During November, they celebrated the 30th anniversary of one of the most emblematic albums of the band Para los arqueólogos del futuro (For the archaeologists of the future), in the midst of the social explosion that was experienced in Chile.

In 2020, Nano Stern, Simón González and under the symphonic direction of Francisco Núñez, made the tribute album to Congreso entitled Ya es tiempo, which has thirteen arrangements of emblematic songs by the band. That same year Congreso releases the single La Plaza de los Sueños and the following year Rock and roll de los misterios in what meant the return to the stage after the pandemic.

On December 28, 2021, Patricio González dies at the age of 72, founder and member of the group between 1969 and 2000.

In September 2022, they release their new studio album entitled Luz de flash (Flashlight). The album won the Pulsar Award for best album of the year in 2023.

== Band members ==
=== Current members ===
- Sergio "Tilo" González, composition, drums, bandleader.
- Francisco "Pancho" Sazo, voice, lyrics.
- Hugo Pirovic, flutes, percussion.
- Jaime Atenas, soprano and alto sax.
- Raúl Aliaga, classical and ethnic percussion.
- Sebastiàn Almarza, piano and keyboards.
- Federico Fauré, acoustic and electric bass.

=== Past members ===
- Fernando Hurtado: (1969–1978)
- Fernando González: (1969–1992)
- Patricio González: (1969–2000)
- Renato Vivaldi: (1975–1979)
- Arturo Riesco: (1977–1978)
- Aníbal Correa: (1980–1985)
- Ernesto Holman: (1980–1985)
- Joe Vasconcellos: (1980–1984)
- Ricardo Vivanco: (1980–1991)
- Carlos Gana: (1985)
- Jaime Vivanco: (1986–2003)
- Jorge Campos: (1986–2006)
- Claudio "Pajarito" Araya: (2001–2004)

== Discography ==
=== Studio albums ===
- 1971 – El Congreso (EMI-ODEON)
- 1975 – Terra Incógnita (EMI-ODEON)
- 1977 – Congreso (EMI-ODEON)
- 1978 – Misa de Los Andes (EMI ODEÓN)
- 1981 – Viaje por la Cresta del Mundo (EMI-ODEON)
- 1982 – Ha Llegado Carta (EMI-ODEON)
- 1984 – Pájaros de Arcilla (CBS Records)
- 1986 – Estoy que me muero... (Alerce)
- 1989 – Para los arqueólogos del futuro (Alerce)
- 1990 – Aire Puro (Alerce)
- 1992 – Los Fuegos del Hielo (Alerce)
- 1992 – Pichanga: Antipoemas de Nicanor Parra (Alerce) (Reissued in 2013)
- 1995 – Por amor al viento (EMI) (Reissued in 1997)
- 2001 – La loca sin zapatos (MACONDO – Sony Music)
- 2010 – Con los ojos en la calle (MACHI)
- 2014 – Congreso sinfónico (MACHI)
- 2017 – La canción que te debía (MACHI)
- 2022 – Luz de flash (MACHI)

=== Live albums ===
- 1987 – Gira al Sur (Alerce)
- 1994 – 25 Años de Música (EMI)
- 2004 – Congreso de exportación: la historia de un viaje (MACHI)
- 2012 – Congreso a la carta (MACHI)
- 2015 – Legado de Trovadores: Grandes éxitos en vivo
- 2018 – En vivo Montreal 1988

=== Compilations ===
- 1991 – Congreso 71–82 (EMI)
- 1997 – Mediodía (IRIS MUSIC)
- 2005 - Grandes Trovadores (Alerce)
- 2009 - Música y Leyenda

=== Singles ===
- 1970 – "Maestranzas de Noche" (EMI ODEON)
- 1971 – "Vamos Andando mi Amigo" (EMI ODEON)
- 1972 – "Entre la gente sencilla" (EMI ODEÓN)
- 1972 – "¿Cómo Vas?" (EMI-ODEON)
- 2015 - "Fin del show" (MACHI)
- 2020 - "Plaza de los sueños" (MACHI)
- 2021 - "Rock and Roll de los misterios" (MACHI)
- 2023 - "En todas las esquinas: 50 años golpe de estado" (Alerce)
