= Eloy Alquinta =

Chilean musician (1971–2004)

- Born: June 22, 1971; Santiago, Chile
- Died: March 15, 2004 (aged 32)
- Occupation: Musician

Eloy Alquinta Ross (22 June 1971 in Santiago – 15 March 2004) was a Chilean musician. He was a member of the band Los Jaivas and Huaika.

== Biography ==
Eloy was the son of guitarist and vocalist Eduardo "Gato" Aquinta. His brothers Moisés, Ankatu and Aurora Alquinta are also musicians.

His musical talent developed under the influence of his father and friends. He learned to play the saxophone (alto, soprano and tenor), the trutruca and cultrun. His first band, Huaika, was formed in 1995 with his brother Ankatu and four others (Francis and John Paul Bosco, Leo and Jorge Yáñez).

After the death of his father in 2003, he started to play the wind instruments in Los Jaivas along with his siblings Ankatu and Aurora.

On March 15 of 2004, aged 33, Eloy suffered a heart attack and died.
