= Cuchufleta =

Chilean musical project

- Origin: Santiago, Chile
- Genres: Rock'n'dino, rock and roll, indie folk
- Years active: 2004 - present
- Label: 27 Sound Entertainment

Cuchufleta is a Chilean musical project that gathers Gregorio Fonten's songs. It was formed as a band in Chile the year 2004 by Fontén with Joaquín Subercaseaux and Amparo Fontaine. Since then, it has had many members changed and they have performed in different countries. Its music mixes rock influences with Latin American music and experimental music. They been catalogued by the press as Los Jaivas’s godchildren.

They are currently signed by the New York label 27 Sound Entertainment.

== Biography ==
Cuchufleta was formed in 2004 by the name of Cuchufleta Punk as a trio with Gregorio Fontén (vocals, piano), Joaquín Subercaseaux (drums) and Amparo Fontaine (violin). Originally, the project was an instrumental composition by Fontén. Motivated by the result of this composition, the band was formed. The "Cuchufleta Punk" composition was included in the band’s first album under the name of "Pitanzas". This first album was released in December 2004 and it sealed Cuchufleta’s first stage, characterized by free improvisation and experimental poetry.

In 2005, Hernán Fontaine joined the band in trumpet, and they released the album Lencería Fina (2006). Cuchufleta was recognized as the most original and daring band in the Chilean musical scene.

For the year 2007, Eduardo Lira from the band Elso Tumbay assumes as musical producer for the recording of the album Cuchufleta (2008). This album centers its music in song format and it is the first album to include a bass, performed by Fontén in the synthesizer. In it the band makes a definitive move into rock music with Hernán switching from trumpet to electric guitar. Singles like Voz Andina, Merengue and Chicha calls the attention of the media and gets Cuchufleta sound close to the prestigious seventies band Los Jaivas. A relationship is formed between Cuchufleta and Los Jaiva’s keyboardist Eduardo Parra.

With Parra assuming as musical producer, Cuchufleta creates the 2009 album "Hoy, joven y vital". This album is dedicated to Rhino Gonzalez who was the lead vocalist of the band Beat 4 during the sixties in Chile. This record gathers generations of Chilean rock music and it is praised by the press for its particular way of merging heterogenous influences with a strong local identity.

By the end of the year 2009, this album is heard by the U.S. label 27 Sound Entertainment and his producer, Matt Stine, invites Fontén to record a new album in New York City. This album is pre-released in Chile in a special deluxe edition. This album uses a special 36 tone scales per octave -instead of the usual 12 and is therefore a pioneering work in the use of alternate tunings in rock and pop music.

== Members ==
Gregorio Fontén: vocals, keyboards, composition (2004 - ) Amparo Fontaine: violin, vocals (2004–2009) Joaquín Subercaseaux: drums (2004 - ) Hernán Fontaine: trumpet, guitar (2004–2009) Marcelo Lavado: guitar (2009 - ) Angelo Cassanello: trombone (2008 - ) Alberto Vignau: bass (2008 - ) Eduardo Parra: keyboards (2009) Alejandro Quiroga: guitar (2008) Clinton Curtis: bass (2010) Javier García-Huidobro: bass (2010) Grey Reinhardt: guitar, keyboards (2010) Marcelo González: bass (2010) Gonzalo Rozas: flute (2005) Trinidad Silva I.: vocals (2010) Miss Elisabeth: vocals (2010) Juan Andrés Fontaine C.: fx keyboards, vocals (2004–2008) Sebastián Caram: percussion (2004–2006) Felipe McRostie: guitar (2008) Michu Schmidt: charango (2008) Diego Santa María: ukulele (2008) Ariel Claure: violin (2008) Juan Osorio: viola (2008–2009) Marcelo Cabello: violoncello (2008) Chino Aros: percussion (2008)

== Discography ==
- 2004 - Cuchufleta Punk
- 2006 - Lencería Fina
- 2008 - Cuchufleta (2008)
- 2009 - Hoy, Joven y Vital
