= Nano Stern =

Chilean musician (born 1985)

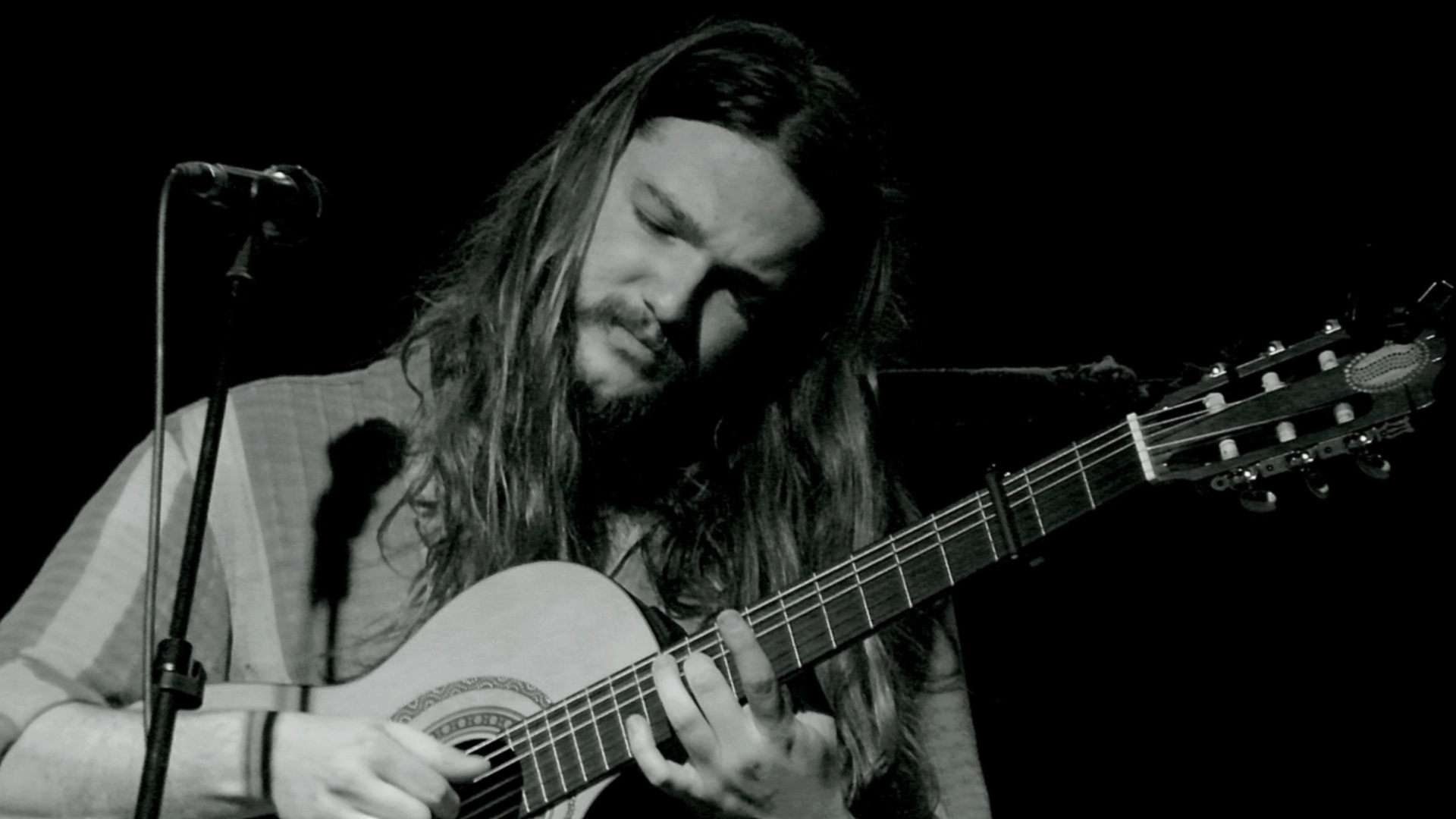

Background information
- Born: Fernando Daniel Stern Britzmann; March 30, 1985 (age 41); Santiago
- Origin: Chile
- Genres: Folk; experimental; world; indie
- Instruments: Vocals; guitar; violin; bass guitar; piano
- Years active: 2005–present
- Website: nanostern.cl

Nano Stern (born in Santiago de Chile, March 30, 1985) is a Chilean singer, multi-instrumentalist and composer of the "third generation of Chilean singer-songwriters" who appear after the 1990s. His work is linked with popular song movements and his style encompasses trova, fusion, folk and rock.

== Career ==
Stern was introduced to music at a young age, starting to play the violin at the age of 3. As a teenager, he played with folk rock bands Matorral and Mecánica Popular. Stern began studying musical composition at university, but at age 19 he abandoned his studies to go to Europe, settling in Cologne, Germany. Here he met the Latin American fusion group Ortiga, who had left Chile during the 1980s, and played with them for some months.

After a year in Germany, Stern moved to the Netherlands to study at the Conservatorium van Amsterdam and began collaborating in various musical projects. His first solo album, Nano Stern, was released in 2006, composed of nine songs including two instrumental pieces. The album was promoted on a tour through Europe and later in Chile in a concert with fellow singer-songwriter Manuel García.

One year later, Stern released Voy y vuelvo (I leave then return) for which he received an Altazor Award and an APES award (Asociación de Periodistas de Espectáculos, Association for Arts Journalists in English) for best album of 2008.

His third album, Los espejos (The mirrors), was nominated by the Chilean version of Rolling Stone as one of the ten best albums of 2009. A documentary, En Casa (At Home), was filmed at a concert held in Santiago for the album's release.

In 2011, Stern released the album Live in Concert, recorded while on tour in Australia.

Las torres de sal (The salt towers) was released in 2011. It included collaborations with musicians Joe Vasconcellos, Francisco Sazo and Antonio Restucci, and was awarded an Altazor for best fusion album.

After seven years of traveling, Nano Stern settled in Santiago in 2012. In 2013 he edited an album titled La Cosecha (the harvest), a collection of Latin American songs which included three songs written by Stern.

Stern has toured widely and played in a number of music festivals, including WOMAD in Australia, Lollapalooza Chile, and the Buenos Aires International Folk Festival. "Being away has a lot to do with being here, being present in absence. Chile becomes very strong when you’re far away, and this is clear when I’m creating. I am inspired by my country very much when I am away… it’s a rich dialogue that keeps me well."

== Influences ==
Nano Stern's musical influences include jazz, rock, folk, fusion and the New Chilean Song styles. His work was also influenced by artists such as Inti-Illimani and Los Jaivas, as well as proponents of the Chilean New Song, Víctor Jara and Violeta Parra.

Stern has also said of his creative process: “In some ways it’s a kind of therapy, in other ways it’s a meditation, it’s an exercise as well and in other ways it’s something I do because I don’t have a better way of communicating with the world. It’s the way I express things, and that’s why I do it…. I do it because there’s no other way.”

== Discography ==
- 2006: Nano Stern.
- 2007: Voy y vuelvo.
- 2009: Los espejos.
- 2011: Nano Stern live in concert.
- 2011: Las torres de sal.
- 2013: La Cosecha.
- 2014: San Diego 850 En Vivo (2 CDs + DVD).
- 2015: "Mil 500 Vueltas".
- 2017: "Santiago"
- 2018: "Lucero"
- 2020: Ya es tiempo, homenaje a Congreso (with Simón González)
- 2022: Aún creo en la belleza

== Official site ==
- Nano Stern official website

== See also ==
- Music of Chile
