= René Olivares =

Chilean painter and designer (1946–2025)

- Born: René Olivares Espínola; 24 December 1946; Santiago, Chile
- Died: 13 October 2025 (aged 78); Paris, France
- Known for: Painting, drawing

René Olivares Espínola (24 December 1946 – 13 October 2025) was a Chilean painter and designer. He was referred to as the sixth member of the band of Los Jaivas.

== Life and career ==
=== Early life ===
René Olivares was the son of René Olivares Becerra, a director of publication (Editora Nacional Quimantú and Laura Espínola. He grew up in Santiago. He didn't like going to school and loved to draw in his father's office. "I grew up watching magazines and my mother's painting books, in which I discovered the life of the cursed artists in Paris and dreamed of imitating them one day". He was 12 when he showed his drawings to the writer Marcela Paz, who was the director of Pandilla's review. She gave him his first job as a painter.

When he was 19, in 1965, he got married and lived in Europe with his wife for five years. They lived in Paris, Rome, Madrid and got back to Chile in 1972.

=== Los Jaivas ===
In 1972 René Olivares met Gato Alquinta, the guitarist and vocalist from the folk/progressive rock group Los Jaivas in Providencia. Alquinta liked his drawing of the Indian with the sun in his hands behind the mountains and would like it for an album cover. But because of the Chilean coup d'état in 1973, the five members of the band with Olivares moved to Argentina and lived in community. So the pintor became the sixth Jaiva.

In 1977 the community Los Jaivas, most of 20 people, moved to Europe. They lived in Biarritz, France, then in the suburbs of Paris. Los Jaivas began to go on tour : England, Spain, Germany, Italy... In 1982 the band came back to Chile but Olivares fell in love with a French woman and decided to stay in Paris. "I am happy to have fulfilled the dream of being a painter in Paris, which I incubated as a child reading my mother's painting books".

René Olivares illustrated for the first time in 1975 an album cover of Los Jaivas with the drawing of 1973 who represented the Indian with the sun in his hands with the album Los Jaivas and he'd illustrate more than 20 albums. He also created posters and logo. To Eduardo Parra, member of the band : "There is no Jaivas without René Olivares nor René Olivares without Jaivas. René is the Jaiva with an unknown face and almost nothing known by his followers. However, his pictorial and stellar presence persists in the consciousness of those who like our music. Already imbued with some songs, listeners cannot help but remember the incredible landscapes with which the painter wanted to exemplify these sounds". He also worked as a scenographer for Teatro Aleph, a Theatrical troupe.

In 2013, by commemorating the fifty years of artistic life of Los Jaivas René Olivares participated at an exhibition in National Museum of Fine Arts in Santiago. To Teresita Raffray, responsible for the production of temporary exhibitions, it was the first time that there was such a musical presence in the museum.

In 2023, to commemorate the sixty years of artistic life of Los Jaivas, the Cultural Foundation Los Jaivas and MetroArte asked Olivares to create a mural at the Cal y Canto station in the Santiago Metro. The structure, which is 30 meters long and 6 meters high, is also a tribute to the Mapocho River, that flows above the subway.

"That allowed me to use it as a metaphor a little bit. [...] then shows the story of the river that was filled with stones and shows Lautarito who stole the horses, crossing the water. There are a series of images that correspond to the river. Now, this is a tribute to Los Jaivas, who are the protagonists above".

René Olivares declared in 2013:

I chose to try to be useful so I could justify other artists. And, above all, to respond to a phrase by Paul Éluard that I love: 'A poet is not the inspired but the one who inspires.' When you are not financially successful, suddenly seeing what has been left behind from your work makes you think that all this has not been useless.

=== Death ===
Olivares died in Paris on 13 October 2025, at the age of 78.

== Exhibitions ==
- Los Jaivas: cinco décadas del rock chileno, National Museum of Fine Arts, Santiago, 2013
- Crónicas de café & otros dibujos, Galería Montegrande, Santiago, 2020
- Exposition de dessin, Paris, 2020
- Los Jaivas y Los Tres, Mallplaza Egaña, Santiago, 2023

== Bibliography ==
- Los Jaivas : cancionero, ilustrado por René Olivares, Ocho Libros Editores/Fundación Mustakis, 2013
- Cultura alter-nativa : Los Jaivas, medio siglo, René Olivares, Ocho Libros Editores, 2013
