= Gregorio Fontén =

Gregorio Fonten (born April 15, 1983, Santiago, Chile) is the artistic or stage name of Gregorio Fontaine Correa, a Chilean multi-instrumentalist musician, composer, visual artist and poet.

== Poetry ==
His book Contemplacion was published in 2001 by Libros de la Elipse. By the end of 2003 the group Foro de Escritores was formed and Fonten channelizes his poetry activities through that group. Together with other members of FDE, Fonten is considered one of the main exponents of experimental poetry of the 21st century in Chile. He has worked with visual, sound, digital poetry and in conventional texts. Of the latter, the Chilean poet Claudio Bertoni has written that they are “good to the point of personal and instransferable jealousy.”

== Music ==
His music ranges from orchestral works to rock bands, from surround electronics to a cappella singing and he has developed a musical language that makes a personal bridge between popular, classic and experimental languages. For the heterogeneity and yet coherence of his music he has been characterized as a musical platypus.

Since 2007, he has been researching and designing his own microtonal tunings. His solo repertory uses a just intonation system. For his piano songs he has been labeled a “dark Satie”.

He was the leader of the band Cuchufleta from the year 2004. The press labeled the band as Los Jaivas' godson.

In relation to the generation of Chilean musicians active in the 21st century, Fonten's music has been described as one of the most unclassifiable and interesting. His language is considered as one of multiple dialogues, unfolding a sound that is both his personal creation as part of a bigger tradition.
