= Francisco Sazo =

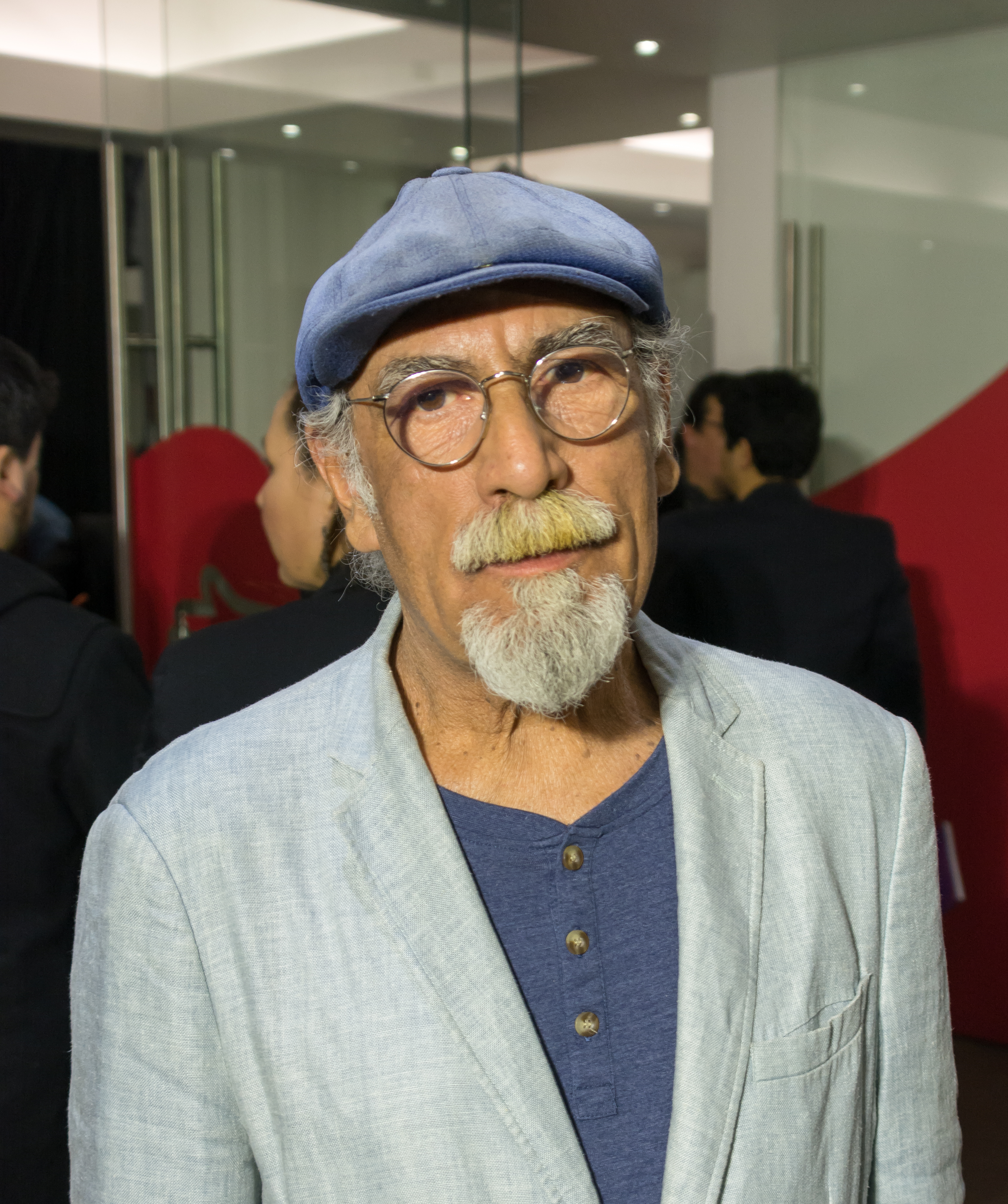
- Sazo in 2019
- Born: Francisco Sazo; March 22, 1953 (age 73); Quilpué, Chile
- Musical career
- Genres: Folk rock, Progressive rock, Jazz fusion, Contemporary classical music, pop, Latinamerican fusion
- Occupations: singer, poet, professor of philosophy
- Instruments: voice, woodwinds, percussion, trutruca
- Years active: 1968–present

Francisco Sazo (Quilpué, March 22, 1953) better known in the musical industry as Pancho Sazo is a Chilean musician and professor of philosophy. Frontman, singer, instrumentalist and lyricist, he is a founding member of the group Congreso, with which he has been in business for more than 50 years.

== Biography ==
He studied at the Liceo Eduardo de la Barra in Valparaíso. Francisco Sazo's beginnings in music date back to the mid-1960s when, as a schoolboy in Quilpué, he formed together with his classmates the group called Los Sicodélicos, a group influenced by the British invasion of The Beatles and the Rolling Stones that tried to make a beat and psychedelic sound on the local scene and that in turn was more avant-garde by including Latin American elements. The group was active only from 1966 to 1968 and managed to edit an LP called Sicodelirium. The album would become one of the benchmarks for the fusion between rock and folklore, albeit in a superficial way, and would mark a clear antecedent of what would later become Congreso. Francisco Sazo sang in English language, but also played some Andean instruments like the quena.

In 1969 he met the González brothers in Quilpué; Patricio, Fernando and Sergio, who together with Fernando Hurtado had a band called Los Masters that was dedicated to making instrumental covers of songs in English. Sergio would invite Francisco Sazo to join the group, and in this way the first official formation of the group would be born, which after Sazo's incorporation, would be called Congreso.

In this way Sazo would become the leading voice of the group as well as in charge of the lyrics. El Congreso would be the first album that the group would record. Sazo would be in charge of the lyrics that would be marked by the pacifist cut typical of the hippie subculture that marked the group in its beginnings. With Sazo as lyricist and singer, and Tilo González as composer and drummer, one of the most important creative pairs in the history of Chilean music would be formed. Due to the Pinochet's military coup, the next album would have to go through rigorous censorship filters, which Sazo would evade thanks to resorting to metaphors and rhetorical figures incomprehensible to the military. Finally Terra Incógnita would go out to the public in 1975 in the middle of the military dictatorship of Augusto Pinochet. Congreso would continue to develop its folk rock with increasingly complex lyrics and musical arrangements with the records Congreso and Misa de Los Andes. In both Sazo would continue as lyricist and singer in addition to instrumental support with tarkas and recorders.

Between 1979 and 1983 he would travel to Belgium to study a postgraduate degree in philosophy, which together with the departure of Fernando Hurtado and Renato Vivaldi, would cause the band's first recess. However, in 1981 the band would reorganize with the entry of Joe Vasconcellos as lead singer. Thus the group would have a stylistic turn closer to progressive rock.

In 1986 Sazo would return to the band and again they would take a more popular path, although always refined, with the album Estoy que me muero and then in 1989 with Para los arqueólogos del futuro, which would consolidate them as one of the most important musical groups in the Latin American sphere.

With the return to democracy, Congreso would become one of the emblematic groups of the country's cultural life, which would be reflected in the 1990 album Aire Puro. Thus, Sazo would be able to be the voice of a certain part of society that liked the musical art that for so many years was cut off from the general culture and could now be expressed with greater freedom and diffusion.

In 1992 Congreso would be evoked in the creation of two highly critically acclaimed concept albums; Los fuegos del hielo and Pichanga: Antipoems by Nicanor Parra. The first would make reference to the ethnic groups of the extreme south of Chile, and the lack of understanding of the society regarding their culture. The second would continue this line but would focus mainly on the rights of the child, with the illustrious participation of Nicanor Parra, and the sponsorship of UNICEF.

Between 1995 and 2010, the group led by Tilo would have a slower work rate in terms of studio work, in the same way, Pancho would continue to contribute to the group's legacy with excellent lyrics and passionate interpretations on the records Por amor al viento (1995), La loca sin zapatos (2001), Con los ojos en la calle (2010) and La canción que te debía (2017). In these albums, Congreso consolidates itself with a Latin American fusion sound that incorporates and integrates both indigenous, African-American, and Latin American folk elements, as well as electrical elements from Chilean rock and pop, always with refined instrumental touches of jazz and contemporary classical music.

Currently Sazo has more than 50 years of musical career, being one of the references of Chilean popular music, and especially of quality Chilean music, which has not traded for massive commercial tastes, or for political obstacles or creative limitations during the period of the dictatorship.
