= Magdalena Matthey =

Chilean singer-songwriter

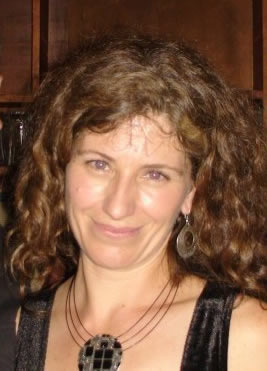
Magdalena Matthey (2009)

Maria Magdalena Matthey Correa, known professionally as Magdalena Matthey (born September 28, 1971, Santiago), is a Chilean singer-songwriter. She works in various genres including folk, popular music, Latin fusion, ballad, jazz and religious music. She has performed with Congreso, Inti-Illimani, Ángel Parra, Eduardo Gatti, Pedro Aznar, Alejandro Filio, Ana María Bobonne. She represented Chile in the OTI Festival 2000 with the song "Tú, naturaleza". Later, she was a participant in Viña del Mar International Song Festival.

== Discography ==
1. Latidos del alma - 1997
2. Del otro lado - 1999
3. Mañana será otro día - 2004
4. Afuera - 2007
5. Rumbos - 2009
