= Laparra =

Laparra is a surname. Notable people with the surname include:

- María Teresa Laparra (1901–1988), Guatemalan activist and First Lady
- Miguel Laparra (born 1962), Spanish politician and sociologist
- Raoul Laparra (1876–1943), French composer
- William Laparra (1873–1920), French painter
