= Mario Mutis =

Chilean musician

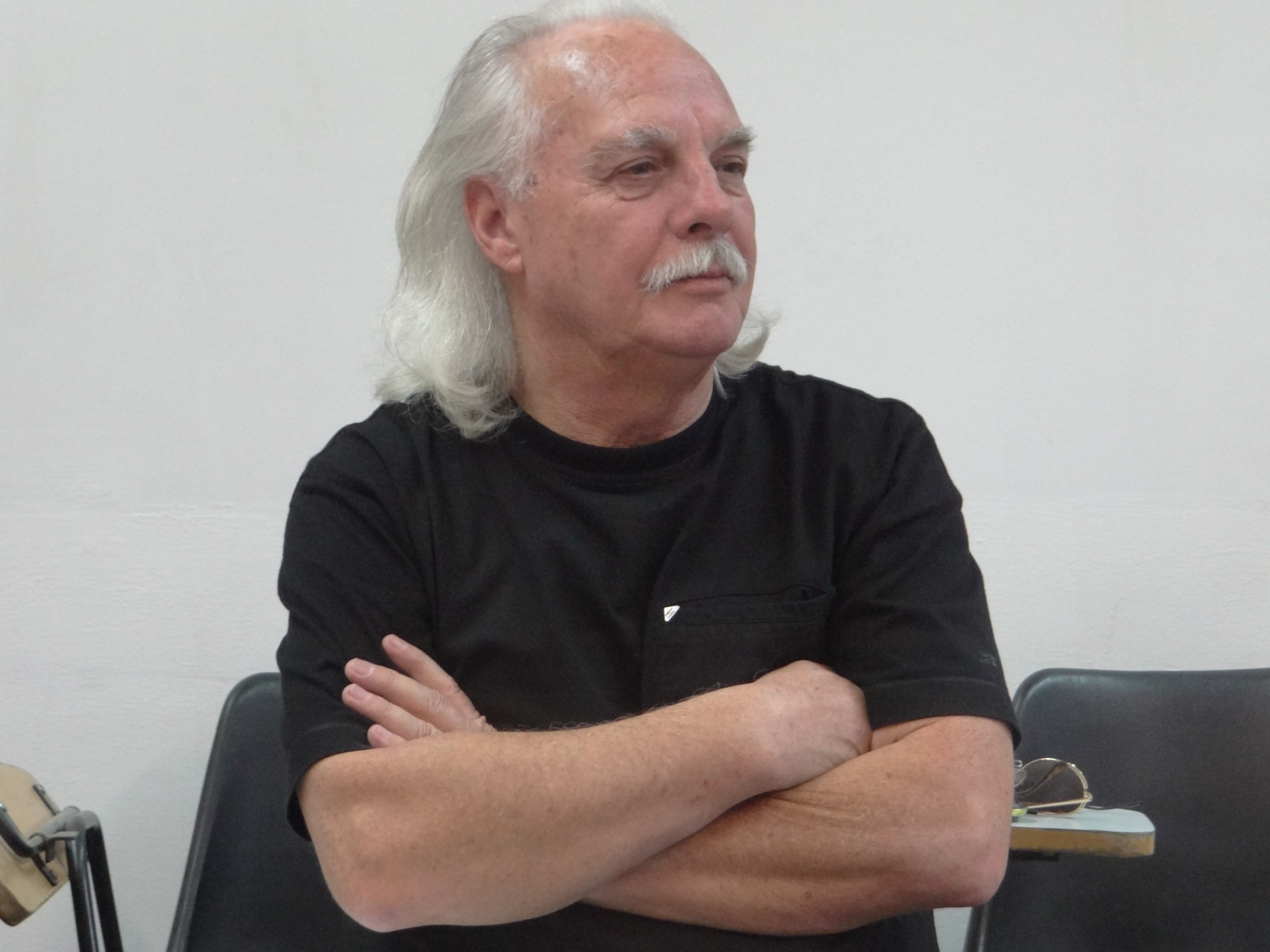

Background information
- Born: 20 October 1947 (age 78); Viña del Mar, Chile
- Genres: Folk rock; progressive rock; latin music; andean music; indigenous music; psychedelic rock; avant-garde
- Occupation: Musician
- Instruments: Vocals; bass guitar
- Years active: 1963–present

Mario Mutis (born 20 October 1947) is a Chilean musician, best known for being the bass player and vocalist for the progressive rock-folk band Los Jaivas.

== Early life ==
Mario Mutis was born on October 20, 1947 in Viña del Mar, Chile

During his childhood he studied at Saint Peter's School in Viña del Mar.

Mutis first encountered the Parra brothers during a school fight at Guillermo Rivera High School in Viña del Mar with Gabriel Parra, the band's future drummer.

== Career ==
In the first formations of the group (then known as The High & Bass), Mutis and Gato Alquinta were guitarists. Mutis eventually switched to bass as the band had no bassists at the time. In 1975 he left the band, during his stay in Argentina, due to personal issues; however, he rejoined in 1979. In 1985 he left the group again and settled in Chile. In 1996 he rejoined Los Jaivas and continues to perform with the band.

In addition to bass, Mutis plays guitar and percussion for Los Jaivas, and also serves as one of two primary vocalists following Alquinta's death in 2003.

In 2011, Los Jaivas were invited to close the fourth day of the Viña del Mar Song Festival. In 2013, they were invited to be part of the jury at the Viña del Mar Song Festival.

== Personal life ==
Mutis resides in Chile.

In 1986, Mutis suffered a stroke and was admitted to the Las Condes Clinic. Mutis eventually regained consciousness after an unknown amount of time.

== Discography ==
=== with Los Jaivas ===
- El Volantín 1971
- Todos juntos 1972
- La Ventana 1973
- Palomita blanca (Movie soundtrack) 1973 (Released in 1992)
- Sueños de América 1974 (Released in 1979)
- Los Jaivas (El indio) 1975
- Canción Del Sur 1977
- Mambo de Machaguay (Compilation) 1978
- Alturas de Macchu Picchu (based on lyrics from The Heights of Macchu Picchu by Pablo Neruda) 1981
- Aconcagua 1982
- Obras de Violeta Parra 1984
- Si tu no estás 1989
- Hijos de la Tierra 1995
- Trilogia: El Rencuentro 1997
- Mamalluca 1999
- En El Bar-Restaurant Lo Que Nunca Se Supo (Compilation) 2000
- Los Jaivas En Concierto: Gira Chile 2000 (Live) 2000
- Arrebol 2001
- Obras Cumbres (Compilation) 2003
- La Vorágine I, Pan Negro (Improvisations 1969-70) 2003
- La Vorágine II, La Reforma (Improvisations 1969-70) 2003
- La Vorágine III, El Tótem (Improvisations 1969-70) 2003
- La Vorágine IV, Mucha Intensidad (Improvisations 1969-70) 2003
- La Vorágine V, ¿Qué Hacer? (Improvisations 1969-70) 2003
- Serie de Oro: Grandes Exitos (Compilation) 2004
