= Joe Vasconcellos =

Chilean musician

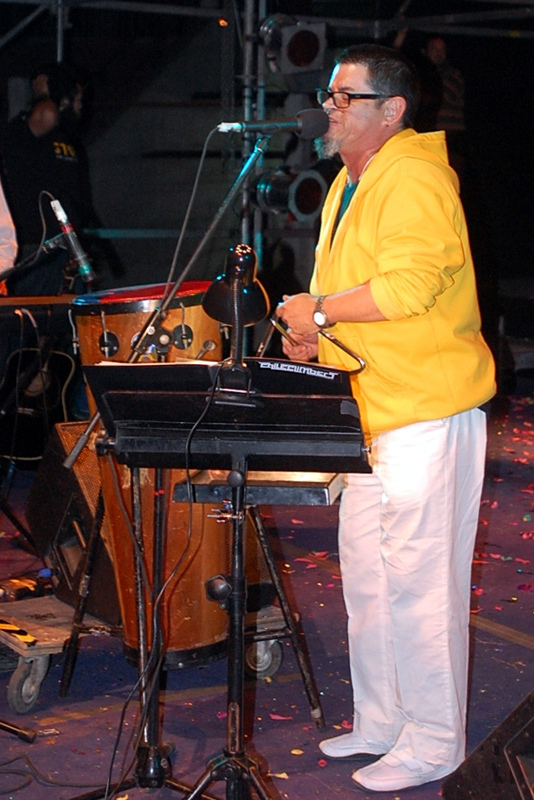
Joe Vasconcellos in Maipú, Chile

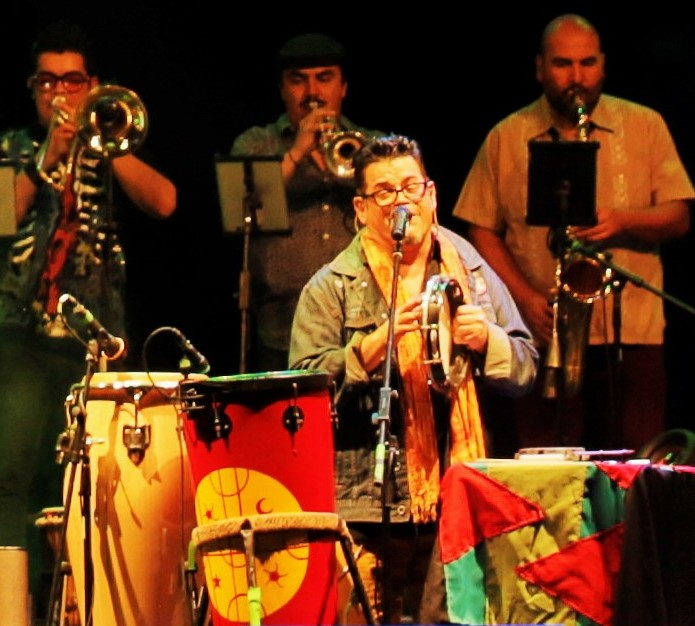
Joe in Tirúa

José Manuel Yáñez Meira de Vasconcellos (born March 9, 1959, in Santiago de Chile), better known as Joe Vasconcellos, is a Chilean singer/songwriter and composer of Latin rock, with influences of Latin American fusion and Brazilian popular music. He is the son of a Brazilian diplomat father and a Chilean mother.

Early in his career, he worked as a singer in the prestigious band Congreso (1980–1984) before having a successful solo career in the 1990s and 2000s.

== Career ==
=== Early Career in Congreso (1980–1983) ===
Born in Chile, Vasconcellos lived in Italy for 20 years before returning to his mother's homeland. He promptly began working as a singer in bars in Viña del Mar, where he met Sergio "Tilo" González, Patricio Gonzalez, Hugo Pirovic, and Ernesto Holman of Congreso. Vasconcellos began performed with Congreso from 1980 to 1983, during which he contributed to the recording of two albums, including Viaje por la cresta del mundo (1981) and Ha llegado carta (1983), and composed also one of the most emblematic songs of the band, "Hijo del sol luminoso" (Son of the Shining Sun). After Ha llegado carta, Vasconcellos left the project in 1984 to seek new adventures in Brazil. Vasconcellos has said that he is very proud of his time with Congreso.

=== Consolidation as soloist (1997–2002) ===
In 1997, Vasconcellos launches Transformación, a record that followed the line of Toque but with a little more sophistication and less batucadas. Their songs sounded on radio were more attached to the Toque, for example, "Preemergencia" and "Funa". As for the quality of their albums, Vasconcellos has failed to their studio recordings strength of their live performances. Maybe that was the starting point for Vivo, the bestselling album in his career. The album was recorded during two concerts events in Teatro Providencia in the winter of 1999, and collected all musician hits, including "Hijo del sol luminoso", "Huellas" and a studio version for "La joya del Pacífico" recorded as a central theme for the TV series "Cerro Alegre" by Canal 13. This album grew positively bond with his audience, ultimately causing his invitation to 2000 Viña del Mar International Song Festival which was a resounding success. Joe then became one of the nation's premier artists and high artistic quality. Also that year he sold just over 130,000 copies. The success allowed the musician to grow in independence. He built a recording studio and grew their production office to give space also to work of other artists, such as Santo Barrio and La Floripondio they recorded their albums there in the new study Batuke. The difficult and overwhelming aspect of fame left the musician with no possibility of designing new songs for some time. Later work on the soundtrack of the Chilean film Taxi para tres, which was greatly appreciated by the single "Volante or Maleta". Also in the film, but this time in animation, Vasconcellos wrote several songs for the soundtrack of Ogu and Mampato in Rapa Nui (which was Chile's submission to the Academy Award for Best Foreign Language Film in 2002), in collaboration with the musician Easter Island Myth Manutomtoma.

== Discography ==
=== With Congreso ===
- 1981 - Viaje por la cresta del mundo
- 1982 - Ha Llegado Carta

=== As Soloist ===
- 1989 - Esto es sólo una canción
- 1992 - Verde cerca
- 1995 - Toque
- 1997 - Transformación
- 2003 - En paz
- 2005 - Banzai
- 2007 - Destino
- 2014 - Llamadas

=== Live albums and compilations ===
- 1999 - Vivo
- 2001 - Taxi para tres
- 2002 - Ogu and Mampato in Rapa Nui
- 2003 - Al mal tiempo buena cara
- 2007 - Joe Vasconcellos en tour
- 2008 - Destino (Álbum + DVD)
- 2009 - Mágico - Grandes Éxitos
- 2009 - Mágico - El Recital (DVD)
