= Carlos Parra =

Carlos Parra may refer to:

- París Galán (Carlos Felipe Parra Heredia, born 1968), Bolivian drag queen, LGBT rights activist, and politician
- Carlos Parra (soccer, born 1977), American soccer defender
- Carlos Parra (footballer, born 1996), Spanish football rightback

== See also ==
- Charlie Parra del Riego (born 1985), Peruvian guitarist
