= Juanita Parra =

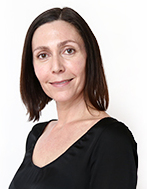
- Parra in 2015

Background information
- Also known as: Juana Parra
- Born: November 19, 1970 (age 55); Santiago, Chile
- Genres: Folk, folk rock, progressive rock
- Occupation: Musician
- Instruments: Drums, percussion
- Years active: 1990-present
- Member of: Los Jaivas

Juana (Juanita) Parra (born 19 November 1970) is a Chilean musician, known as the drummer and percussionist of the Chilean progressive rock–folk band Los Jaivas. Joining the band three years after her fathers death, she is the only woman to play in the band over its fifty-year history. Her style of drumming was distinctive and known for successfully mixing Latin and Progressive Rock.

She is the daughter of Gabriel Parra, and Eugenia Correa. Gabriel was the original drummer of Los Jaivas. He died in a car accident in Peru in 1988.

Juanita joined the band as the drummer after her father's death. Her first CD with the band was Hijos de la tierra in 1995.
