= Claudio Parra =

Chilean musician

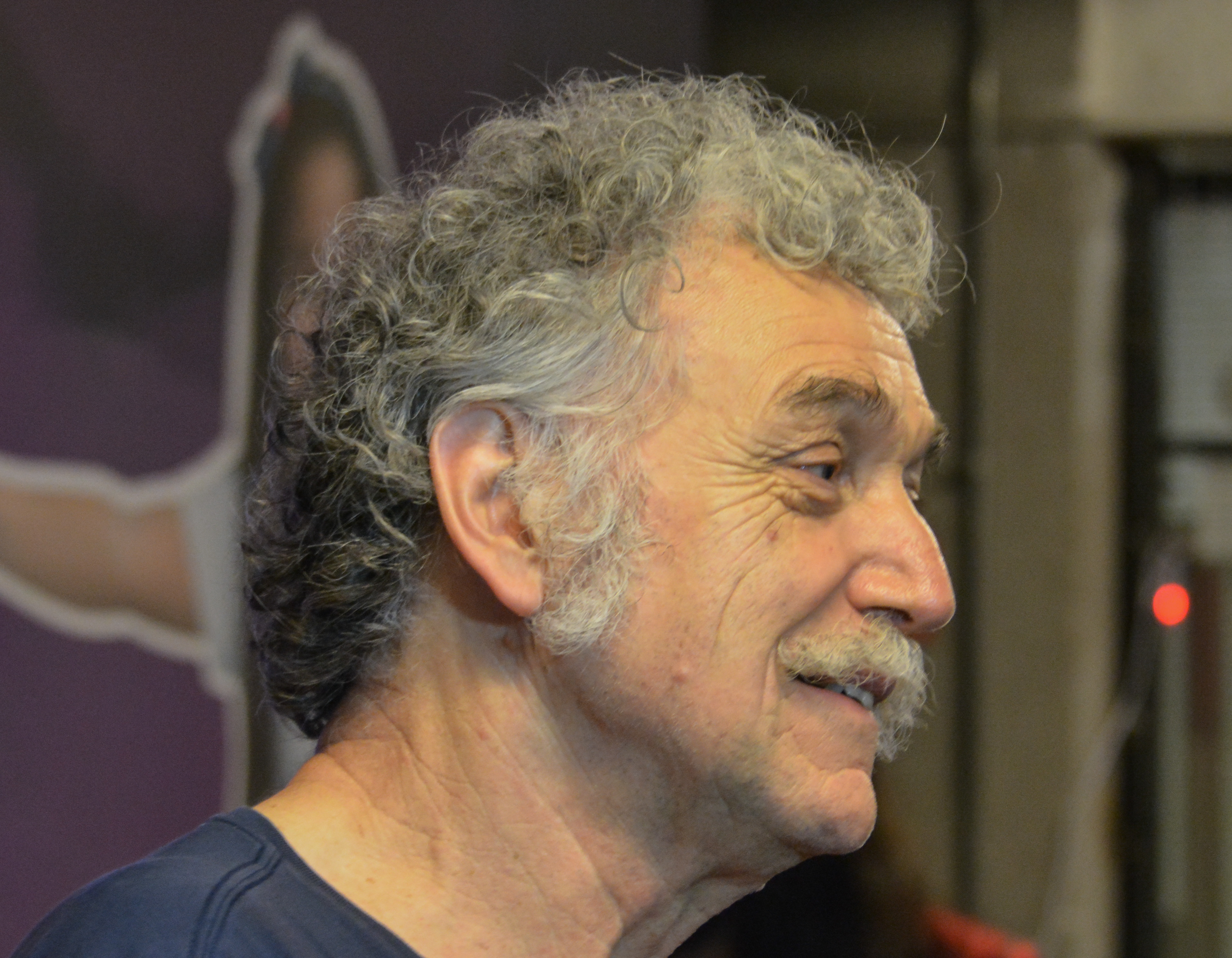
- Parra in 2017
- Born: Claudio Parra Pizarro; 14 September 1945 (age 80); Viña del Mar, Chile
- Occupation(s): Pianist, keyboardist
- Years active: 1963–present
- Children: 3

Claudio Parra Pizarro (born 14 September 1945) is a Chilean musician, pianist, and composer. He is one of the founders of Chilean rock band Los Jaivas. He is an undisputed referent of the piano with a properly Chilean sound, and considered one of the most important in the history of popular music in Chile.

== Biography ==
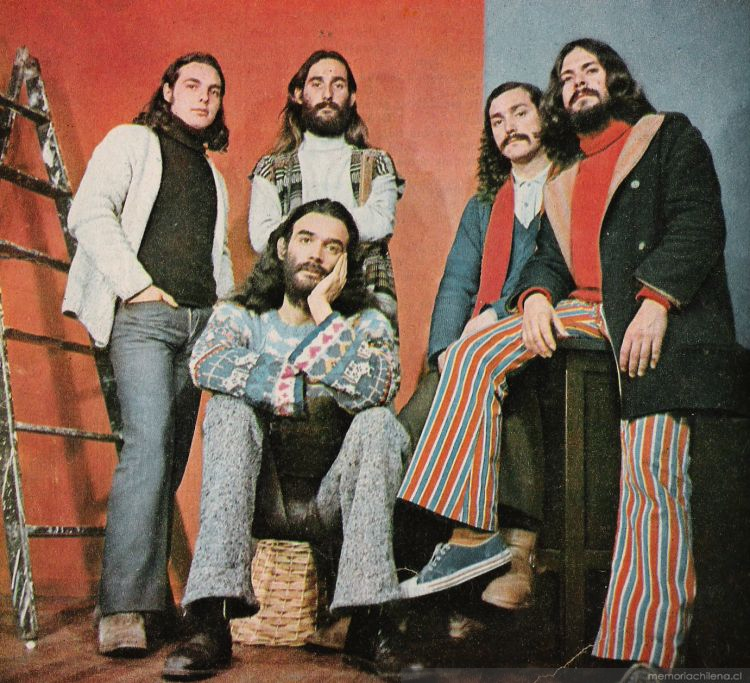
Claudio, second from right to left, Los Jaivas in 1972

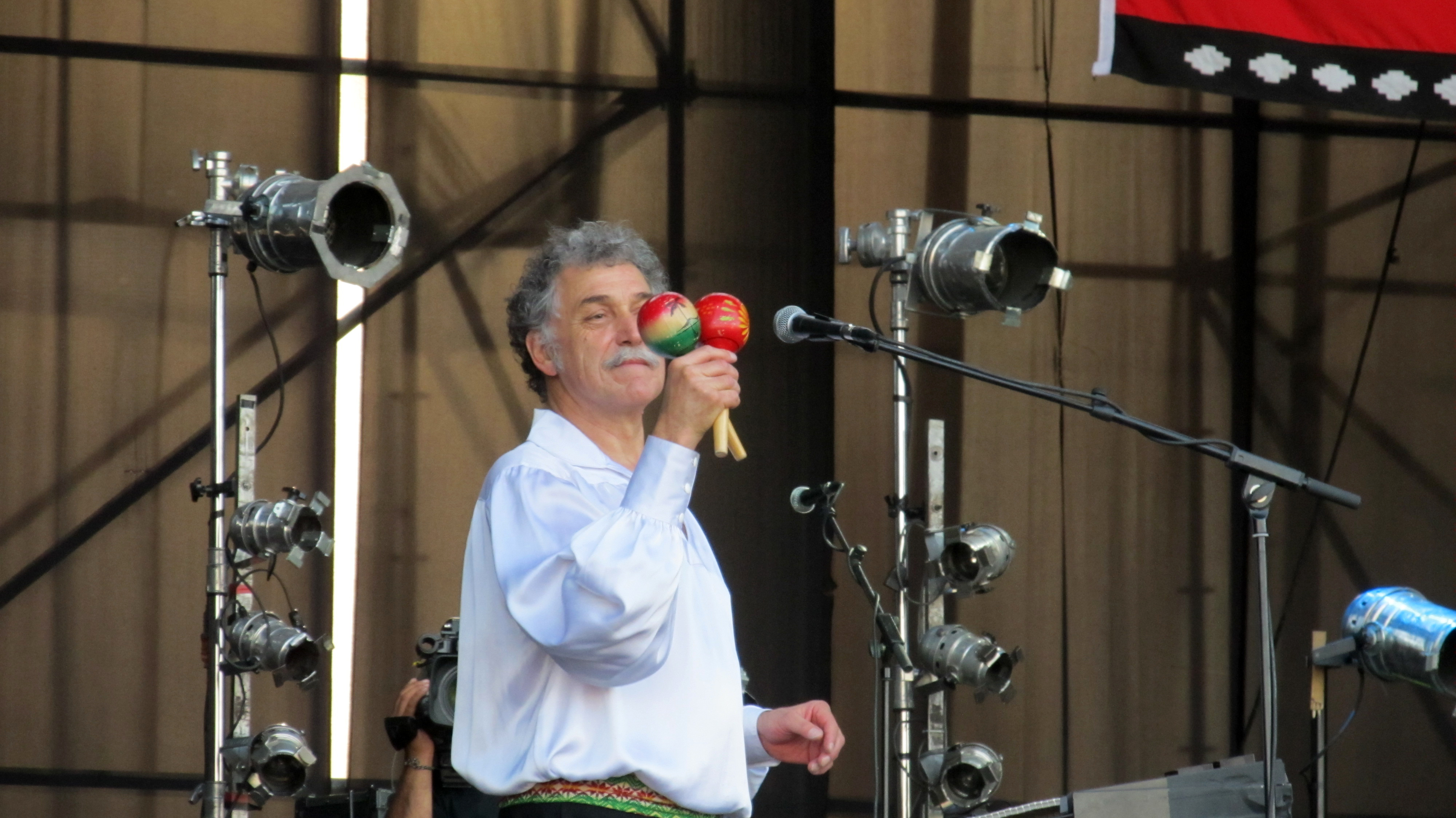
Claudio Parra, alongside Los Jaivas, at Lollapalooza Chile 2012.

Claudio is part of the Parra family of Viña del Mar, they are distant relatives of the Parra clan, from where Violeta Parra, Nicanor Parra and Roberto Parra, among others, emerged. Claudio became friends with Gato Alquinta at school, their friendship later led to the creation of the band.

The formal approach to music occurs under the influence of two family members: his uncle Ramón Parra Román ("Uncle Moncho"), who had been a talented classical piano soloist. And his aunt Gladys, who took him along with his brother, Eduardo, to concerts by the Chilean Symphony Orchestra and to presentations of the great Chilean pianist Claudio Arrau. Between the ages of eight and twelve, and thanks to these influences, Claudio began to cultivate classical music techniques.

When The High & Bass –the original name of Los Jaivas– was formed, Claudio's job was to play the accordion. Convinced by a professor at the Federico Santa María Technical University while studying engineering in 1965, Claudio decides to drop out, travel to Santiago and apply to the Conservatory of the University of Chile. Learning intensively, however, starting at nineteen years old at the conservatory is not an optimal age. Claudio manages to enter the Conservatory and becomes the only member of the group to have formal musical training. He moved from the accordion to the piano, an instrument that would characterize his work in the group's most glorious years, and that would define an important part of his distinctive sound.

His knowledge of academic music has also led him to be the constant link between the band and the orchestras with which they have worked in their symphonic incursions, in such works as "Letanias Por El Azar", "Los Caminos Que Se Abren", "Corre Que Te Pillo" and the album Mamalluca (1999). The composition of melodies is his strength, and his characteristic piano is the one that guides songs as influential as "La Conquistada", "La Poderosa Muerte" and "Mira Niñita". However his influence is more noticeable in progressive works such as those heard in: "Obras de Violeta Parra" from 1984 and in his piano centric composition "Elqui", which appears on the album: Mamalluca. But he has also executed interesting arrangements on synthesizers, such as those that adorn the song "Amor Americano" from the album Alturas de Machu Picchu, from 1981 and the complete album Si Tú No Estás from 1989.

Within the band, he is the inveterate collector, the one in charge of keeping the updated archive of the concerts and recordings of Los Jaivas, as well as the memories and the scores. Due to his sociable nature, he is the member of the group that has given the most interviews to the press, and in recent years he has been in charge of presenting the songs at concerts. After the death of Gato Alquinta, his function as the band's "musical director" led him to be the one who trained and prepared Gato's children, Eloy and Ankatu, to be his replacement.

In 2007 he received a tribute from the engineer Carolina Hernández at the Plaza de Armas in Santiago de Chile.

He is the only band member to have been in Los Jaivas since its inception.
