= Trutruca =

Mapuche wind instrument

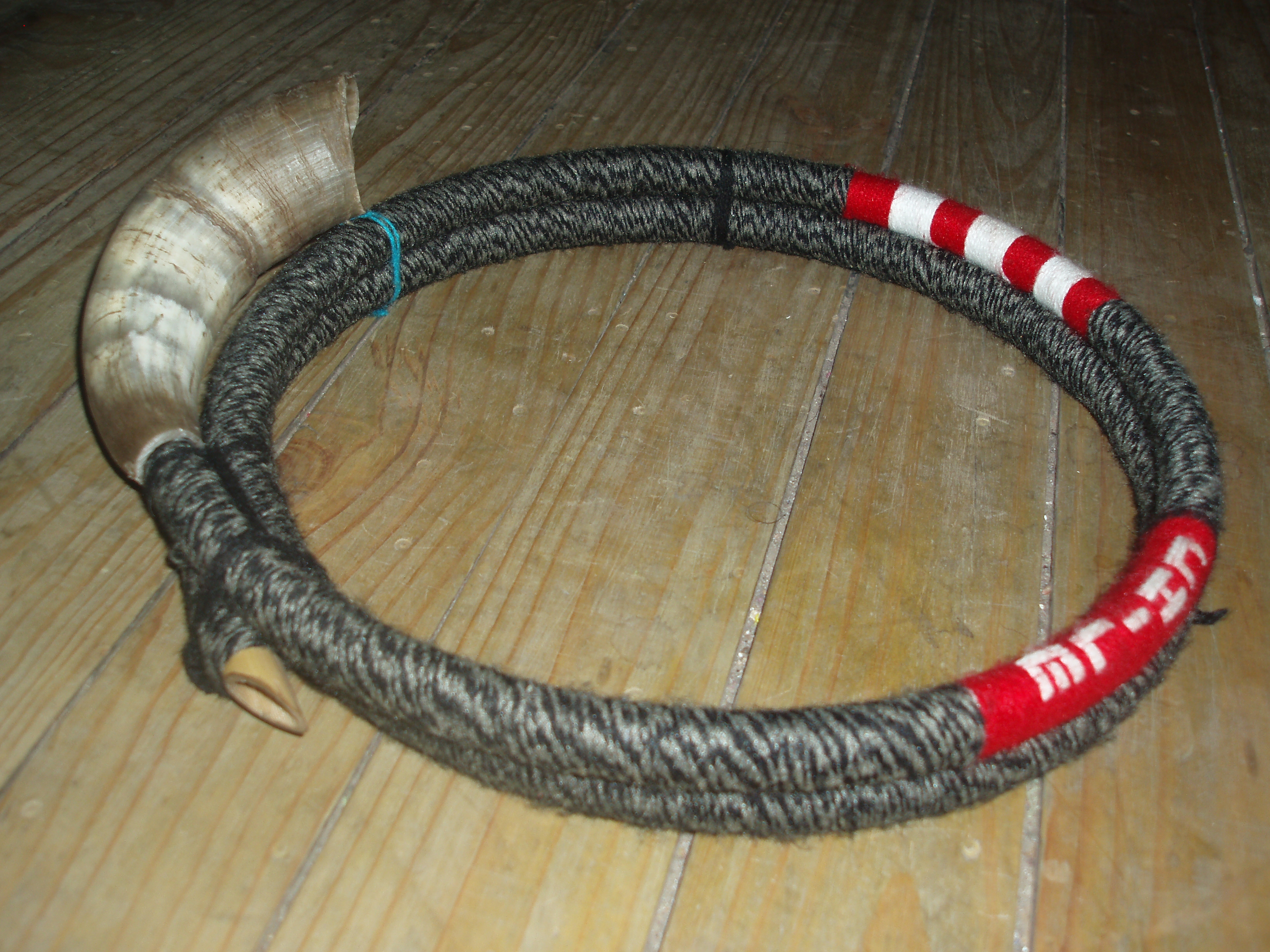
Chilean trutruka

The trutruca or trutruka (Spanish trutruca) is a wind instrument of the trumpet family. It is played mainly by the Mapuche of Chile and Argentina. It produces a loud harsh sound, with few tonal variations.

== Description ==
The instrument has two main parts, the body and horn. The body is made from Chilean bamboo (Chusquea culeou) and is between 2 and 5 meters long and 2 to 10 cm in diameter. The cane is cut lengthwise into two halves and then wound with string, wire, wool and animal gut, usually horse, to prevent air escaping.

The notes are produced from the variations in the pressure caused by blowing and also by the position of the lips.

The sound of a trutruka being played

== See also ==
- Alphorn
- Erke
