= Eduardo Alquinta =

- Born: January 22, 1945
- Died: January 15, 2003 (aged 57) Coquimbo, Chile
- Genres: Folk
- Instruments: Vocals, guitar
- Formerly of: Los Jaivas

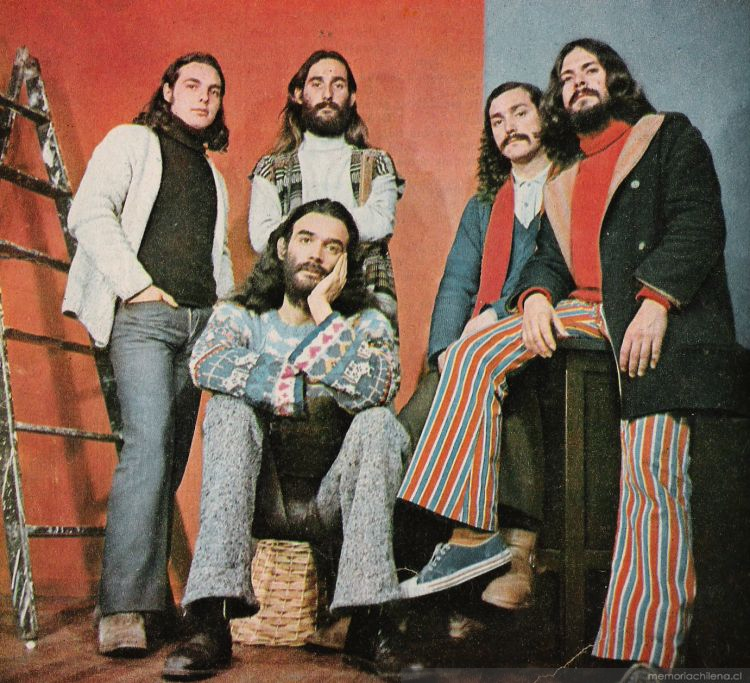
Gato Alquinta (right) with Los Jaivas in 1972

Eduardo Fernando Alquinta Espinoza (January 22, 1945 – January 15, 2003), more commonly known by his friends and followers as "Gato" Alquinta, was a Chilean guitarist and vocalist from the folk/progressive rock group Los Jaivas, Chile's longest-surviving group. He died of a heart attack while on vacation in Coquimbo, Chile.

== Biography ==
=== Early years ===
Son of Carlos Alquinta and Aurora Espinoza Rojas, he began to devote time to music at the age of 12. He learned the songs of Atahualpa Yupanqui without his father noticing him. He met Claudio Parra at the Guillermo Rivera high school in Viña del Mar, with whom he shared his love of cinema. This closeness turned into friendship with the entire family of Claudio and Mario Mutis, another friend of the clan.

=== Beginnings in Music ===
By 1963, the year he began studying engineering at the Federico Santa María Technical University, along with Mario Mutis and the Parra members, they formed a tropical combo called The High & Bass that animated parties. In the group, he was the guitarist and one of the vocalists in the band. Later, he dropped out of engineering to study architecture, a career that he would share with Mario, and that he would not finish either. In 1968, he began to believe that the tropical music that the band performed was incompatible with the ideals that they were trying to convey to the public. For this reason, he traveled to several countries in America together with his wife, to search for new ideas and inspirations to establish a new musical component. Later, when he returned to Chile, he suggested to the band that they should be more original and be able to break with the established schemes to make their ideals known. The idea was well received, so they adopted the name of Los Jaivas in 1970. Before the appearance of their first official work, the studio album El volantín, from 1971, made the recordings that were later released in 2004 in a five-disc set called La Vorágine.

=== Los Jaivas ===
After the coup d'état in 1973, the entire band decides to flee to Argentina, where they continue with their musical career. Soon after, because of the repression of the military regime in Argentina, they had to leave for France. They settled there in 1977, in the city of Paris. From there, Los Jaivas experimented with music, through the use of imagination and inspirations. Alquinta declared on one occasion that the song Mira Niñita, was inspired while traveling by bus on Viana Street, so when they got to the Parra members, they made the song, being one of the most popular of the band. Later in 1981, Los Jaivas created their most famous and important album, Alturas de Machu Picchu, where several of their songs were inspired by the lyrical work of Pablo Neruda. Over the years, while Los Jaivas were innovating in various musical genres such as progressive rock, Latin American fusion and folklore, they were acquiring progressively more fame. Apart from being the band's guitarist and vocalist, Alquinta also dedicated himself to writing the lyrics for several famous band songs such as the aforementioned 'Mira Niñita', 'Pájaro Errante','Nubecita Blanca', 'Indio Hermano', among many others, which is why he became the best-known figure in the band. During an interview for Revista Vea in 1981, Alquinta declared that he was also dedicated to making musical instruments, such as zampoñas, trutrucas, flutes with reeds collected both in Chile and in Argentina and Bolivia. Additionally, he said that he considered himself some kind of mentholatum within the band because he constantly changed instruments.

=== Death ===
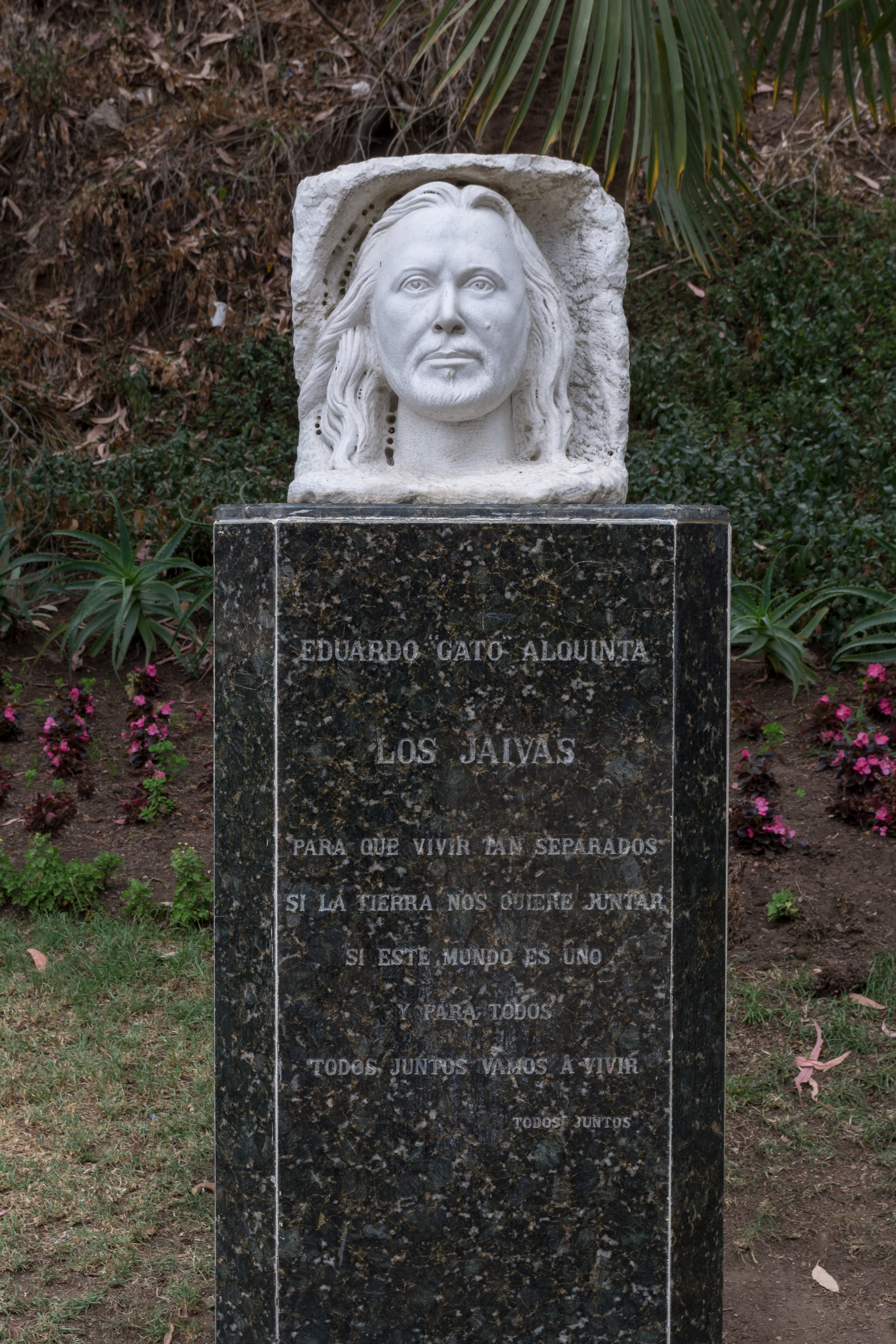
Monument to Gato Alquinta in Viña del Mar.

While on vacation with his family at the Mistral tourist complex, on La Herradura beach in Coquimbo, Gato Alquinta lost his balance on some rocks and fell into the water where he remained for several minutes. When he was pulled out of the water, he was unconscious, so he was transferred to the San Pablo de Coquimbo Hospital, but despite efforts to revive him, he died on January 15, 2003, at 6:45 p.m., at the age of 57 years old. After an autopsy by the Legal Medical Service, they determined that his cause of death was heart attack. More than five hundred thousand people attended his funeral in the streets of Santiago, while his name became one of the most iconic figures in Chilean music.
