= Gabriel Parra =

Gabriel Parra (25 July 1947–15 April 1988) was the drummer of Chilean folk group Los Jaivas. He was the youngest of the three Parra brothers who formed the band.

He died in a car accident in Peru on 15 April 1988. After this accident, his daughter Juanita Parra replaced him as drummer in Los Jaivas.

== Notoriety ==
He is widely considered to be the top drummer from Chile, with a unique and strong style. In 1979 Los Jaivas toured England for the first time. They played at the Shaftesbury Theatre in London, where they were seen by a writer from Music Week. He later wrote that Gabriel Parra was one of the ten top drummers in the world.

== See also ==
- Chilean rock
