= Eduardo Parra Pizarro =

- Born: 1943 (age 82–83); Los Andes, Chile
- Genres: Rock; Jazz fusion
- Occupations: Musician, poet
- Instruments: Keyboard, percussion
- Formerly of: Los Jaivas

Eduardo Parra (Eduardo Parra Pizarro?) (July 24, 1943, in Los Andes, Chile) is a member of the Chilean rock fusion band Los Jaivas. He is the oldest of the Parra brothers (plus Claudio and Gabriel). Eduardo plays the keyboards and some percussion instruments.

== Poetry ==
He has written several poetry books, including:

- La Puerta Giratoria.Ediciones Rivera Scott. 1968
- Pequeño contratiempo justo a final de siglo. Ediciones Rumbos. 1996
- Cuentos de Paciencia-Ficción. Editorial Efímera. 1987
- Ruego por ti, Valparáiso. Editorial Contemporánea S.A.
- La isla de la dulzura. Ediciones Los Jaivas. Sony BMG.
