= Los Jaivas =

Chilean musical group

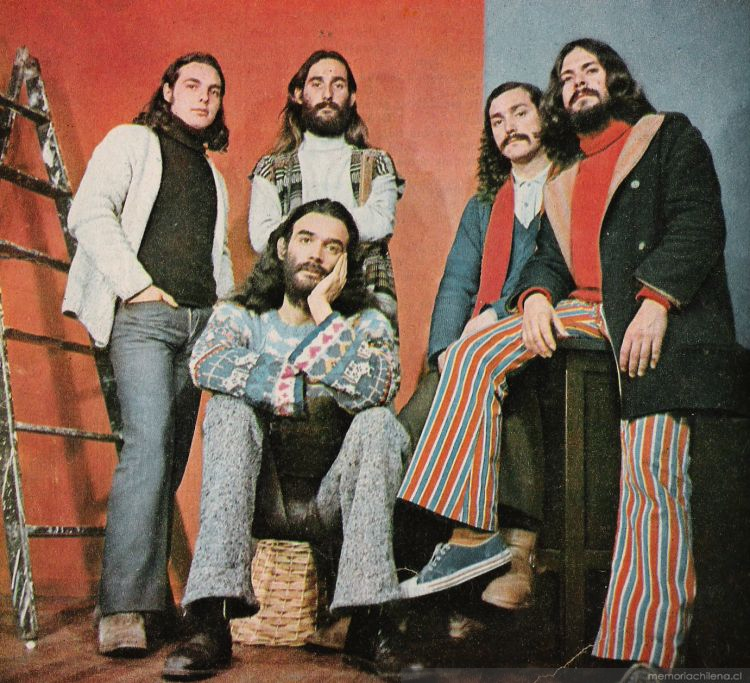
- Los Jaivas in 1972

Background information
- Origin: Viña del Mar, Chile
- Genres: Folk rock; progressive rock; andean; indigenous music; Folk; psychedelic rock; avant-garde
- Years active: 1963–present
- Members: Juanita Parra; Claudio Parra; Mario Mutis; Carlos Cabezas; Alan Reale; Francisco Bosco
- Past members: Gabriel Parra †; Eduardo "Gato" Alquinta †; Eduardo Parra; Ankatu Alquinta; Julio Anderson †; Pájaro Canzani; Alberto Ledo †; Marcelo Muñoz; Fernando Flores; Eloy Alquinta †; Aurora Alquinta; Juan Pablo Bosco

Los Jaivas is a Chilean musical group who perform in folk, rock, psychedelic, and progressive rock styles formed in 1963 in Viña Del Mar, Chile. They are considered one of the most important and influential artists of all time in Latin America.

== History ==
Los Jaivas was started by the brothers Eduardo, Claudio and Gabriel Parra, from Viña del Mar. Together with their friends and classmates from high school at the Liceo Guillermo Rivera Cotapos, they first played on August 15, 1963, under the name of The High & Bass as a progressive-rock-andino group, mixing rock with South American ancestral music.

At that time in Chile, it was customary to use English names for musical bands. Another source indicates that the name is a reference to the members differences in height, since the word in Spanish for bass guitar is the same as that for short (bajo). Another source explains the name as a reference to the bass guitar played at a very high volume compared to the other instruments. During the following six years, and with its stable formation (Eduardo on keyboards, Claudio on accordion and piano, Gabriel on drums, Gato on guitar and Mario on bass) the band played at parties and social gatherings in Viña del Mar, mainly performing music tropical, cha cha cha, bossa nova and boleros, with good results.

They quickly realized that an English-sounding name was not appropriate for a folk band, so they changed it to Jaivas ("high bass").

Between 1970 and 1971, and with its Spanishized name "Los Jaivas", the group's concerts became absolute improvisations, without scripts or prepared schemes, and with each musical instrument generating its own atmosphere, even with the help of the audience. Improvisation led them to the appreciation of Latin American musical roots and to the exploration of the sounds of ancestral instruments, which allowed them to combine apparently irreconcilable styles, but which Los Jaivas decided to capture in their subsequent musical creation.

Several concerts from this time, including those held at the Vanguard Music Festival of Viña del Mar (January 1970), the Sala de la Reforma of the Faculty of Musical Arts and Sciences of the University of Chile (May 1970), the Cine Arte de Viña del Mar (June 1970) and the Park of the Cultural Institute of Las Condes (May 1970), in addition to the soundtrack prepared for a film that was never made (¿Qué Hacer? by Raúl Ruiz, soundtrack recorded in October 1970), are reflected in the five-disc collection entitled La Vorágine, which documents the stage known as the Prehistory of Los Jaivas.

During this time, in addition, the group participates in the mythical Red Stone Festival and records its first official record label, homonymous, but known as El Volantín, due to its characteristic cover. The album, released in 1971, contains improvisations along the lines of the avant-garde explored previously, but it also includes the first compositional sketches, especially on songs like "Foto de Primera Comunión" and "Que o la Tumba Seras".

In 1972 they released the Todos Juntos album. Its title track was a plea for unity among the people while "Mira Ninita" became another staple of the band's live set.

However the next year the band was forced to take refuge in Argentina after the military dictatorship took over in Chile. In 1977, they headed to France, where they resided for a long time.

During this period of exile, they released the albums Los Jaivas (El Indio) (1975), Cancion Del Sur (1977) and their most acclaimed album Alturas de Macchu Picchu (1981), which was based on the poems of Pablo Neruda.

The band also flew to Peru to record a seminal concert video on the grounds of the famous Incan castle.

Subsequent albums included Aconcagua (1982) and Obras De Violeta Parra (1984). The latter album was based on the works of the Chilean communist folk singer Violeta Parra (unrelated to the Parra brothers).

Tragedy struck the band in 1988 when Gabriel died in Peru in a car crash. His daughter Juanita took his place behind the drums. In January 2003, the main singer, Gato Alquinta, died in Coquimbo, Chile, of a heart attack while swimming in the sea.

Gato's three sons soon joined the band to replace him: Ankatu (guitar), Eloy (saxophone) and Aurora (vocals). Aurora left shortly after, and Eloy died of a heart attack in 2004. Ankatu, however, is still a member of the band.

Among various other activities, in 2006 the group performed a historic concert on Easter Island, in addition to the Chilean Navy orchestra, and as part of the celebrations for the month of the sea. On September 20, 2006, Canal 13 broadcasts the television special Los Jaivas en Rapa Nui: Ojos Que Miran el Universo, which includes fragments of the recital, as well as interviews with the group and with inhabitants of the Island. The DVD that includes the event It was finally launched on the market in November 2007 under the title of Los Jaivas en Rapa Nui. On March 22, 2011, Los Jaivas make a presentation in tribute to the then American president Barack Obama in the courtyard of Los Cañones of the Palacio de La Moneda.

== Homage ==
The band celebrated its 50th anniversary in an open concert on the front of the National Museum of Fine Arts of Santiago de Chile. Special guests were Inti Illimani, Los Tres and Congreso among others. The concert attracted a multitude of over 60,000 people, causing major upheaval in the city, and the police had to intervene with water cannons.

== Biopic ==
In March 2013, the same year as the celebration of the band's 50th anniversary, Chilean-Dutch filmmaker Erasmo de la Parra (son of Claudio Parra) convinced the musicians to make a biopic based on the band's formative years. The film would be set in the 1960s in Viña del Mar, from the time they were known as "The High Bass" to the time they became known as "Los Jaivas". The director revealed on the film's official Facebook page that the production would have gone through long negotiations with Netflix, but that the production house eventually chose other projects. The film, titled The High Bass, is in pre-production with an unknown release date, and with the participation of Belgian, Dutch, and British producers.

In 2020, the 140-minute documentary Los Jaivas: Todos Juntos was released, honouring the band's 55-year history. It was directed by Rodolfo Garate.

== Members ==
=== Current members ===
- Claudio Parra – keyboards, piano, vocals (1963–present)
- Mario Mutis – vocals, bass guitar, guitars, percussion (1963–1975; 1979–1985, 1996–present)
- Juanita Parra – drums, percussion (1990–present)
- Carlos Cabezas – vocals, charango, violin, flute, zampoña, quena (1998–present)
- Francisco Bosco – saxophone, organ, zampoña, quena (2004–present)
- Alan Reale – guitars, vocals (2013–present)

=== Former members ===
- Eduardo Parra – keyboards, organ, percussion (1963–2009)
- Eduardo "Gato" Alquinta – vocals, guitars, zampoña, flute, quena (1963–2003; his death)
- Gabriel Parra – drums, percussion (1963–1988; his death)
- Julio Anderson – bass guitar (1975; died 2023)
- Alberto Ledo – quena, charango, zampoña (1975–1980; died 2010)
- Carlos Canzani – bass guitar, guitars (1975–1979)
- Fernando Flores – bass guitar (1988–1995)
- Marcelo Muñoz – drums, percussion (1989–1990)
- Aurora Alquinta – vocals (2003)
- Ankatu Alquinta – vocals, guitars (2003–2013)
- Eloy Alquinta – vocals, saxophone, percussion (2003–2004; his death)
- Carlos Eduardo Gonzalez - guitar (2013)
- Juan Pablo Bosco – drums, percussion (2004–2005)

== Discography ==
- El Volantín 1971
- Todos juntos 1972
- La Ventana 1973
- Palomita blanca (Movie soundtrack) 1973 (Released in 1992)
- Sueños de América 1974 (Released in 1979)
- Los Jaivas (El indio) 1975
- Canción Del Sur 1977
- Mambo de Machaguay (Compilation) 1978
- Alturas de Macchu Picchu (based on lyrics from The Heights of Macchu Picchu by Pablo Neruda) 1981
- Aconcagua 1982
- Obras de Violeta Parra 1984
- Si tu no estás 1989
- Hijos de la Tierra 1995
- Trilogia: El Rencuentro 1997
- Mamalluca 1999
- En El Bar-Restaurant Lo Que Nunca Se Supo (Compilation) 2000
- Los Jaivas En Concierto: Gira Chile 2000 (Live) 2000
- Arrebol 2001
- Obras Cumbres (Compilation) 2003
- La Vorágine I, Pan Negro (Improvisations 1969-70) 2003
- La Vorágine II, La Reforma (Improvisations 1969-70) 2003
- La Vorágine III, El Tótem (Improvisations 1969-70) 2003
- La Vorágine IV, Mucha Intensidad (Improvisations 1969-70) 2003
- La Vorágine V, ¿Qué Hacer? (Improvisations 1969-70) 2003
- Serie de Oro: Grandes Exitos (Compilation) 2004
