= Que Pena Siente el Alma =

Song by Violeta Parra
- Released: 1955
- Label: Odeón
- Songwriter(s): Violeta Parra

"Que Pena Siente el Alma" is a song written and performed by Violeta Parra released on the Odeón label (E-50040) in 1955.

The song became one of Parra's most popular and was also performed on her extended play record, Chants et Danses du Chili I (1956), and again on her album, El folklore de Chile según Violeta Parra (1962). It has also been reissued on multiple compilation albums, including The Songs of Violeta Parra (1997), Antologia (2003), and Cantos Campesinos (2003).
