= La Jardinera =

Song by Hermanas Parra
- B-side: "Es imposible"
- Released: 1954
- Genre: Tonada; Nueva canción chilena
- Label: Odeón
- Songwriter(s): Violeta Parra

"La Jardinera" is a song in the tonada genre written and performed by Violeta Parra. The song was originally recorded by the Hermanas Parra (Violeta Parra and Isabel Parra) and released on the Odeón label (89-952 A).

The song became one of Parra's most popular and was also performed on her extended play record, Chants et Danses du Chili I (1956), and again on her album, Toda Violeta Parra (1961). It has also been reissued on multiple compilation albums, including The Songs of Violeta Parra (1997), Antologia (2003), Cantos Campesinos (2003), and La jardinera y su canto (2005).

The song has also been covered by numerous artists, including Silvana Kane, Isabel Parra, Nydia Caro, Olivia Chaney, and Juan Vicente Torrealba.
