= Gastón Guzmán (singer-songwriter) =

Chilean singer-songwriter (c.1937–2019)

Background information
- Birth name: Gastón Guzmán Muñoz
- Born: c. 1937; Angol, Chile
- Died: August 28, 2019 (age 82)
- Occupation: Singer-songwriter

Gastón Guzmán Muñoz (c. 1937 - August 28, 2019) was a Chilean singer-songwriter. A native of Angol, Chile, he was a founder, with his brother Eduardo (1940-2012), of the Chilean musical group, Quelentaro. Quelentaro recorded approximately 20 albums, telling stories, usually in the first person perspective, about the lives of workers, peasants, students, women, and settlers. In 2015, he was honored with the designation as a fundamental figure of Chilean music.

== Discography ==
=== Quelentaro albums ===
- 1967 - Coplas al viento
- 1968 - Huella campesina
- 1969 - Leña gruesa
- 1969 - Coplas libertarias a la historia de Chile, Vol.1
- 1970 - Judas
- 1972 - Cesante
- 1972 - Coplas libertarias a la historia de Chile
- 1975 - Quiebracanto, tiempo de amor
- 1976 - Tiempos de amor
- 1977 - Qué de caminos
- 1979 - Buscando siembra
- 1982 - Lonconao
- 1983 - Reverdeciendo
- 1985 - Aquiebracanto
- 1988 - "En Vivo" (grabado en 1985, en vivo, Teatro Gran Palace)
- 1989 - Después de la tormenta
- 1996 - 8 de marzo
- 2002 - 8 de marzo, volumen 2
- 2005 - Por siempre (grabado en 2003, en vivo)
- 2007 - Coplas libertarias a la historia de Chile, Vol. 1 y 2 (nuevas versiones)
- 2011 - Coplas libertarias a la historia de Chile, Vol. 3 y 4
- 2013 - Copla del hijo

=== Collaborations ===
- 1966 - Carpa de La Reina (de Violeta Parra)
- 1979 - El cantar de la yunta (varios intérpretes)

=== Books ===
- 2002: Amanocheciendo (LOM Ediciones)
- 2005: Desde mi cuarto (Editorial GUIRAKA)
- 2010: Coplas libertarias a la historia de Chile vol I, II, III y IV (autogestión con auspicio de la Municipalidad de Maipú)
- 2013: Coplas al viento (autogestión)

==== Books about Quelentaro ====
2004: Quelentaro por dentro (Editorial Universidad de Los Lagos, Osorno), de Antolin Guzmán Valenzuela

== See also ==
- Quelentaro on Spanish Wikipedia
