= Huella campesina =

Studio album by Conjunto Quelentaro
- Released: 1968
- Label: EMI Odeón Chile

Conjunto Quelentaro chronology
Coplas al viento (1967)	Huella campesina (1968)	Leña gruesa (1969)

Huella campesina is the second album from the Chilean musical group Conjunto Quelentaro. It was released in 1968 on the EMI Odeón Chile label (catalog no. LDC 35057). The members who participated in the album are Gastón Guzmán, Eduardo Guzmán, Valericio Leppe, Eladio López and Arinaldo Álvarez. The entirety of Side A is an 18-minute track, "Coplas a don Manuel Jesús", dedicated by the Guzmán brothers to their father and the hard life of peasants.

In the album's liner notes, R. Nouzeilles wrote: "Quelentaro amazes us with peasant verses and authentic folkloric interpretations. May your message of frank and loyal humanity be understood by all the people of this earth."

== Track listing ==
Side A

1. "Coplas a don Manuel Jesús" (Gastón Guzmán, Eduardo Guzmán) [18:19]

Side B

1. "No sé qué tiene esta calle" (Del folklore) [3:06]
2. "El jilguero" (Del folklore) [3:07]
3. "El cartero" (Del folklore, Eduardo and Gastón Guzmán) [3:29]
4. "Voces de cobre" (Eladio López) [3:10]
5. "Gañán" (Gastón Guzmán, Eduardo Guzmán) [2:56]
6. "Amasando" (Gastón Guzmán, Eduardo Guzmán) [4:09]
