= Coplas libertarias a la historia de Chile =

Studio album by Quelentaro
- Released: 1969
- Label: EMI Odeón Chile

Quelentaro chronology
Leña gruesa (1969)	Coplas libertarias a la historia de Chile (1969)	Judas (1970)

Coplas libertarias a la historia de Chile is the fourth album from the Chilean musical group Quelentaro. It was released in 1969 on the EMI Odeón Chile label (catalog no. LDC 35179). All tracks were written and performed by brothers Gastón Guzmán and Eduardo Guzmán. The album was released as Volume 3 in the series, "Música Para la Historia de Chile", an effort to narrate the independence of Chile in song.

== Track listing ==
Side A

1. "Introducción"
2. "Nacencia De Don Bernardo"
3. "Adolescencia De Don Bernardo"
4. "Regreso Del Héroe"
5. "Primera Junta De Gobierno"
6. "Motín De Figueroa"

Side B

1. "Don José Miguel Carrera"
2. "Abolición De La Esclavitud"
3. "Segundo Cuartelazo Carrerino "
4. "Traición A Los Carrera"
5. "El Dictador"
6. "La Aurora De Chile"
