= Tonadas =

Tonadas may refer to:

- Tonadas (Simón Díaz album), 1974
- Tonadas (Violeta Parra album)
- Tono humano or tonados, secular song, a main genre of 17th-century Spanish and Portuguese music
- Tonada, a folk music style of Latin America
