= Canto y guitarra =

Studio album by Violeta Parra
- Released: September 1957
- Genre: Chilean folklore
- Length: 50:31
- Label: Odeón

Violeta Parra chronology
| Chants et Danses du Chili II (1956) | Canto y guitarra (1957) | El folklore de Chile Volumen 2 (1958) |

Canto y guitarra, also known as El folklore de Chile, is an album by Violeta Parra released on the Odeón label in September 1957. It was Parra's first full-length album, released after her return from Europe where she had traveled for two years.

The album included 17 songs, some of which are older folklore songs and others composed by Parra. Parra's compositions include "Verso por la niña muerta" which was inspired by the death of Parra's daughter, Rosita Clara, while Parra was in Europe. Another original composition, "Verso por despedida a Gabriela Mistral", was a tribute to the Chilean poet Gabriela Mistral who died in January 1957.

The album cover features a portrait by G. Meisser and includes liner notes by Raúl Aicardi. The album's title reflects the fact that all of the songs are interpreted solely by Parra on voice and acoustic guitar.

== Track listing ==
Side A

1. La inhumana (Refalosa)
2. Es aquí o no es aquí (Esquinazo)
3. Son tus ojos (Vals)
4. Parabienes al revés (Parabién) (Violeta Parra)
5. Tres cuecas punteadas (Solo de guitarra)
6. Verso por saludo
7. Ausencia (Habanera) (Tomás Gabino Ortiz)
8. Las naranjas (Tonada)
9. El sacristán (Polka)

Side B

1. Versos por la sagrada escritura (Canto a lo divino)
2. Viva la luz de Don Creador (Parabienes de novios)
3. El bergantín (Vals)
4. Verso por la niña muerta (Canto a lo humano) (Violeta Parra)
5. Tres polkas antiguas (Solo de guitarra)
6. Verso por despedida a Gabriela Mistral (Violeta Parra)
7. No habiendo como la maire (Tonada)
8. La paloma ingrata (Mazurka)
