= Sheila Hicks =

American artist (born 1934)

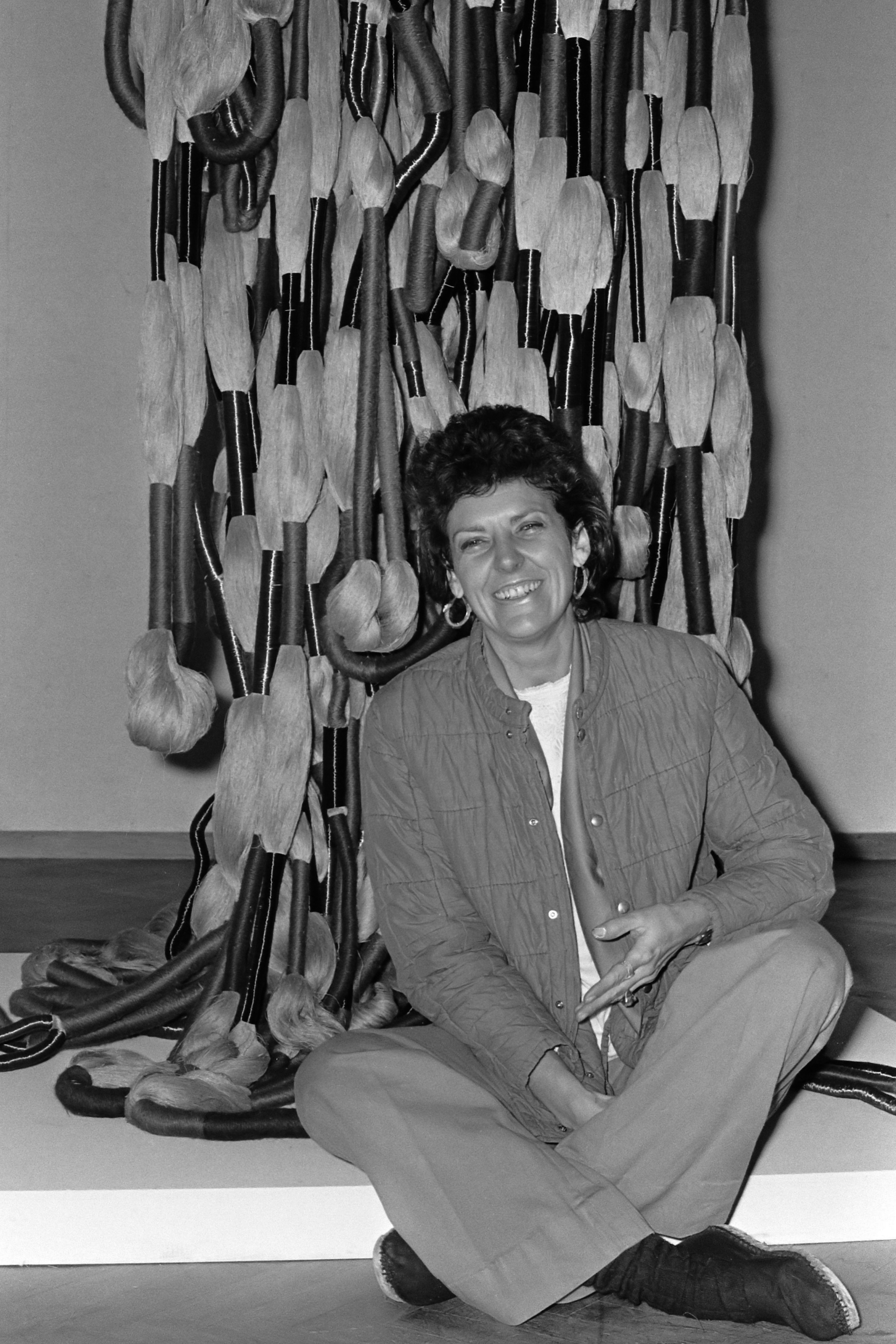
- Sheila Hicks (1974)
- Born: July 24, 1934 (age 92); Hastings, Nebraska, US
- Known for: Textile Art
- Spouses: Enrique Zañartu; Melvin Bedrick
- Website: sheilahicks.com

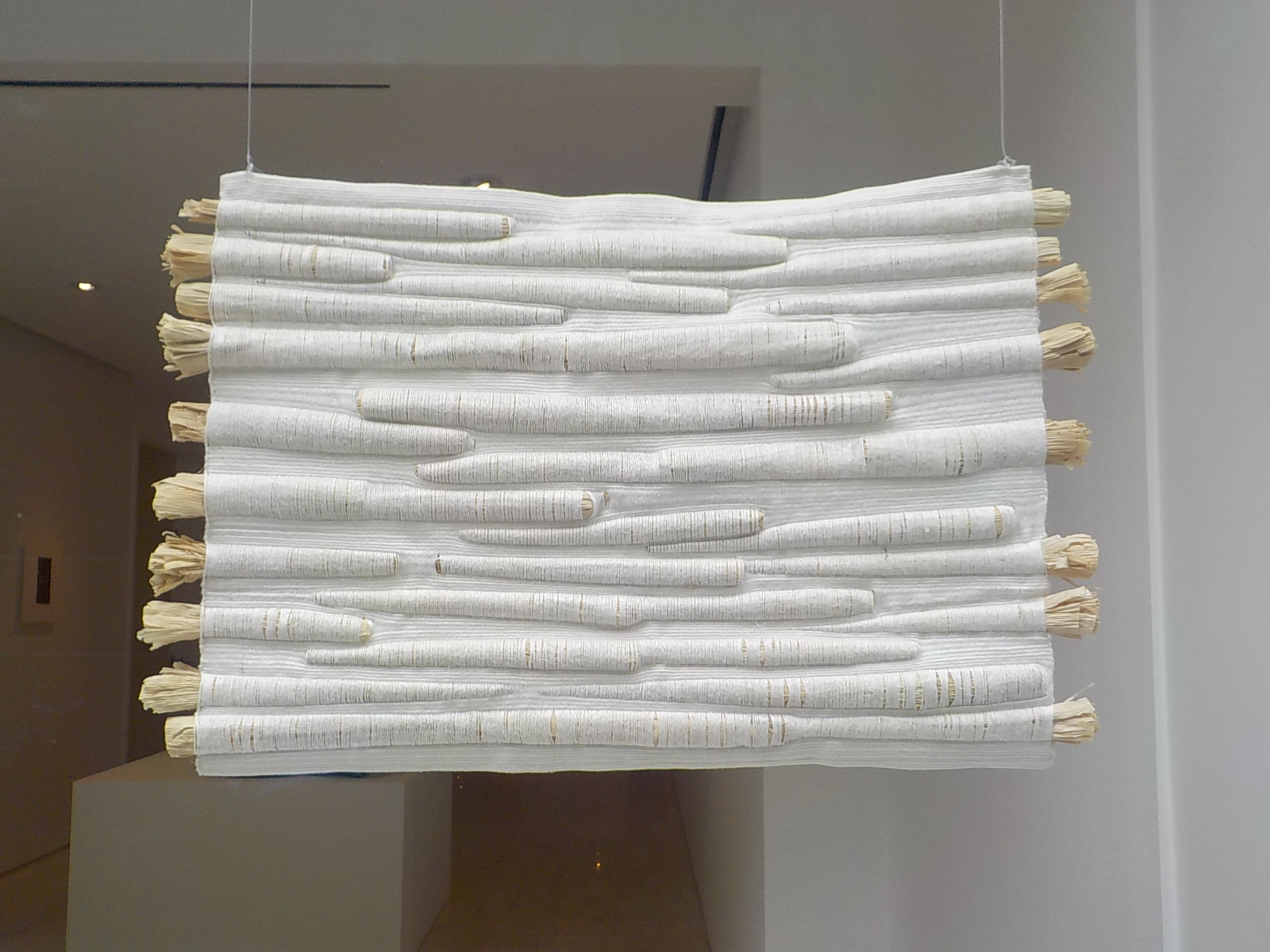
2019 exhibit at the Demisch Danant gallery, New York City

Sheila Hicks (born July 24, 1934) is an American artist and a pioneering figure in fiber art. Working across six decades, she expanded the scale and ambition of textile practice from small hand woven works to monumental hanging columns made up of vibrant fibers that occupy architectural space. Her work crosses the boundaries between art, architecture, and site responsive installation, and is held in major public collections all over the world.

== Early life and education ==
Hicks was born in Hastings, Nebraska in 1934. She attended the Yale School of Art in Connecticut from 1954 to 1959, where she studied with Josef Albers, Rico Lebrun, Bernard Chaet, George Kubler, George Heard Hamilton, Vincent Scully, Jose de Riviera, Herbert Matter, Norman Ives, and Gabor Peterdi. Her thesis on pre-Incaic textiles was supervised by archaeologist Junius Bird of the American Museum of Natural History in New York. She received her BFA in 1957 and her MFA in 1959, both from the Yale School of Art.

Born during the Great Depression in Hastings, Nebraska, Sheila Hicks spent much of her early life on the road, with her father seeking work where he found it. This "fantastic" and "migratory existence", as she has described it, has come to define her six-decade career as an artist. Extensive experiences traveling, living, and working around the world continue to advance her exploration of textiles, the pliable and adaptable medium with which she is most closely associated. "Textile is a universal language. In all of the cultures of the world, textile is a crucial and essential component", Hicks has said. Captivated by structure, form, and color, she has looked to weaving cultures across the globe to shape her work at varying scales, from small hand-woven works called Minimes and wall hangings; to sculptural fiber piles like The Evolving Tapestry: He/She (1967–1968); to monumental corporate commissions, among them Enchantillon: Medallion (1967), a prototype for an installation at New York's Ford Foundation. More recently, Pillar of Inquiry/Supple Column (2014) demonstrates Hicks's intense fascination with experimental materials: a whirling structure of multicolored synthetic fibers cascades from the ceiling, as if breaking through from the sky above.

== Historical context and style ==
Hicks became an artist at Yale in the 1950s. At Yale her final project was about Andean textiles from before the Incas. This project showed that she thought textile was a way to tell stories from the past. Textile is a language that everyone in the world can understand, Hicks said. She believes that textile is very important in every culture. This idea made her want to learn about weaving in different places around the world. She worked with artists from Mexico, Morocco, India, Chile and Japan.

Hicks makes big column artworks like Pillar of Inquiry/Supple Column and The Questioning Column. These artworks are connected to the idea of columns in architecture. Hicks looked at where the etymology of the word "column" comes from, which is the word "kolophon" (from Greek) meaning the top or highest point. She used threads to make her columns come alive. A long time ago columns were painted and Hicks is bringing back that idea with her colorful threads.

Hicks' artworks are designed for the specific spaces they occupy. Some of her column artworks are freestanding, though this was not always the original intent. During a 2018 festival in Belgium, she placed The Questioning Column in a castle moat because it could not be suspended from the ceiling. She has continued to install her artworks in this manner.

Hicks started making art at the time that fiber art was becoming more popular in the 1960s and 1970s. This was a time when artists were trying to figure out where fiber art fit in the art world. Artists, like Hicks, who made textile artworks helped to make fiber art a part of the art world.

== Career ==
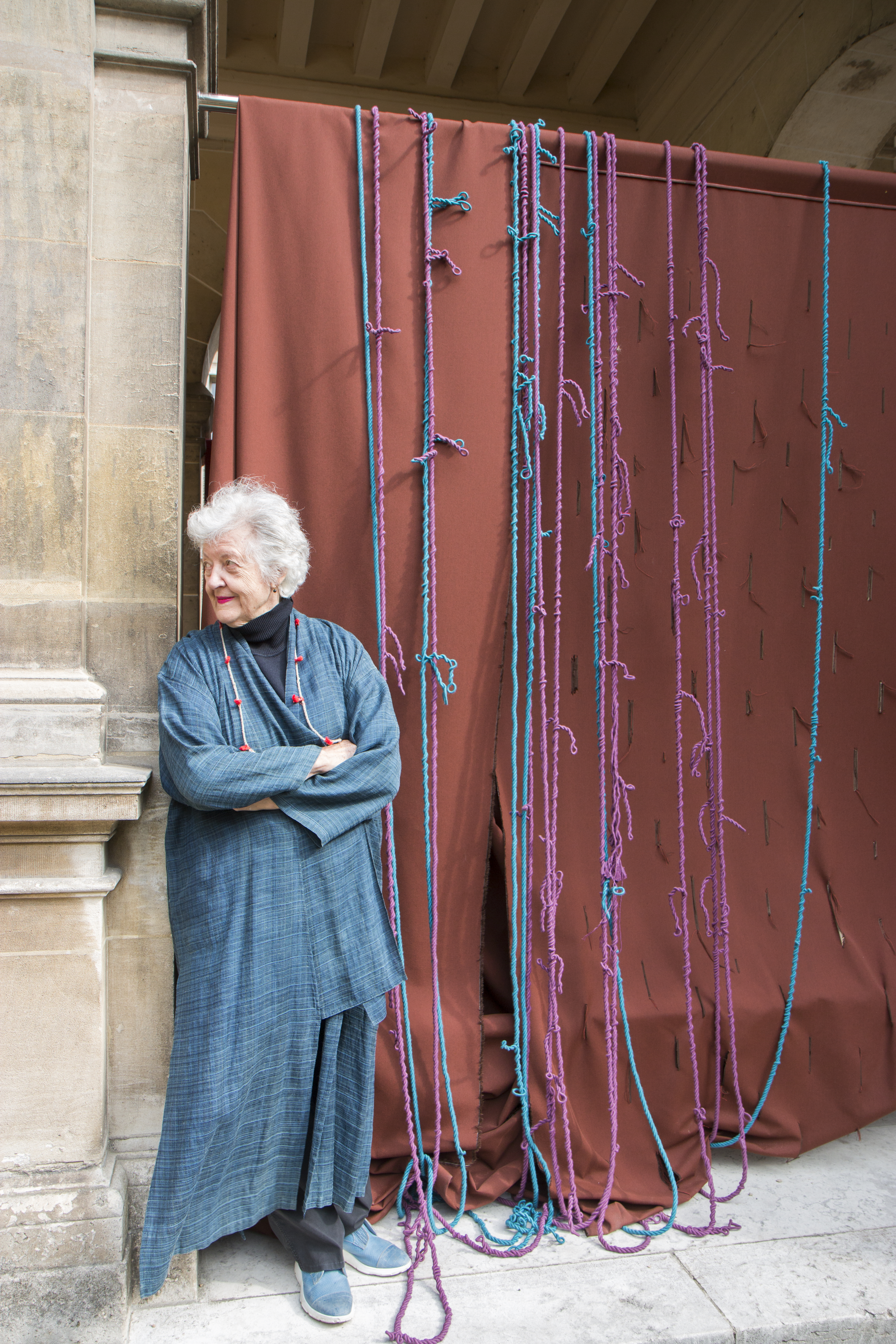
Sheila Hicks at the Musée Carnavalet, Paris, 2016. Photograph by Cristobal Zanartu

From 1959 to 1964 she resided and worked in Mexico; She moved to Taxco el Viejo, Mexico where she began weaving, painting, and teaching at the National Autonomous University of Mexico (UNAM) at the invitation of Mathias Goeritz who also introduced her to the architects Luis Barragán and Ricardo Legorreta Vilchis. Since 1964, Hicks lives and works in Paris, France.

In the mid-1960s Hicks designed textiles for Florence Knoll after an introduction by the Museum of Modern Art's nascent design department. More recently, re-issued and updated versions of these designs were used by the artist and designer Philippe Malouin the to upholster his own furniture designs.

She photographed extensively with her Rolleiflex. Her subjects included the architecture of Félix Candela and artists active in Mexico. The Pérez Art Museum Miami holds the artwork Tapestry (1977), an example of her cultural textile explorations.

In 2007, the publication Sheila Hicks: Weaving as Metaphor, designed by Irma Boom to accompany the exhibition of the same name at Bard Graduate Center, was named "Most Beautiful Book in the World" at the Leipzig Book Fair.

In 2010 a retrospective of Hicks' 50-year career originated at the Addison Gallery in Andover, Mass. with additional venues at the ICA in Philadelphia, and at The Mint Museum in Charlotte, North Carolina. This included both miniature works (her "minimes") and large scale sculpture.

In 2014, the 18-foot-high Pillar of Inquiry/Supple Column was included in the Whitney Biennial.

In 2017 Hicks had a solo exhibition at Alison Jacques Gallery in London. Hicks also participated in the 2017 Venice Biennale, Viva Arte Viva, May 13 – November 26, 2017.

In 2018, February 7 – April 30, Hicks had a solo exhibition Life Lines at the Centre Pompidou which included more than 100 works.

On August 15, 2019, Hicks was profiled in The Wall Street Journal, "Inside Textile Artist Sheila Hicks's Paris Studio."

In 2021, June 4 – July 31, Hicks had a solo exhibition Music to My Eyes at Alison Jacques, London. The same year Hicks' work was included in the exhibition Women in Abstraction at the Centre Pompidou.

On April 21, 2022, Hicks had an interview with T: The New York Times Style Magazine, the title of the interview was "Artist Sheila Hicks: Observing Her Surroundings in the Courtyard". She said the following about the way she works: "I move from idea to finished work acrobatically — it's as though I can feel the clouds shifting and the light coming and going. But because I frequently use fiber and textiles, I'm also quite specific in the way I work; unlike a video artist or a digital artist, I'm physically engaged in the creation of all my work. It's a manual practice but filtered through the optics of architecture, photography, form, material and color. A couple of years ago, I received an honorary doctorate from my school — I went to Yale in the '50s — and it made me very happy because it validated my choice to work and live as an artist. It meant that I could contribute something to the other fields, and so I'm seeking out what that might be, unlike many artists, who are seeking simply to express themselves."

On April 13, 2023, Alison Jacques announced plans to expand the gallery's presence in London with a new location at 22 Cork Street – the new space will open with a solo show of new work by Sheila Hicks.

Her work was included in the 2024 exhibition Making Their Mark: Works from the Shah Garg Collection at the Berkeley Art Museum and Pacific Film Archive (BAMPFA).

In June 2025, Dior unveiled a reimagined version of the Lady Dior handbag, a collaboration between Dior's new creative director Jonathan Anderson and Hicks.

In 2025 Hicks had her first solo exhibition at SFMOMA New Work: Sheila Hicks.

From 12 October 2024 to 23 February 2025 the Kunsthalle Düsseldorf and the Josef Albers Museum Quadrat Bottrop jointly presented her first major solo exhibition in Germany, bringing together more than 250 works made between 1955 and 2024.

== Personal life ==
In 1964, Hicks moved to Paris, France, with her daughter where she has lived ever since. In 1965, she married fellow artist Enrique Zañartu with whom she had a son. Since 1989, she has been married to Melvin Bedrick.

== Work ==
Hicks' art ranges from the minuscule to the monumental. Her materials vary as much as the size and shape of her work. Having begun her career as a painter, she has remained close to color, using it as a language as she builds, weaves and wraps to create her pieces.

She incorporates various materials into her "minimes", miniature weavings made on a wooden loom. These include transparent noodles, pieces of slate, razor clam shells, shirt collars, collected sample skeins of embroidery threads, rubber bands, shoelaces, and Carmelite-darned socks. Her temporary installations have incorporated thousands of hospital "girdles" – birth bands for newborns – baby shirts, blue nurses' blouses and khaki army shirts, as well as the wool sheets darned by Carmelite nuns.

The products of Hicks' free experimental practice, crossing what some may see as boundaries between tapestry, weaving, sculpture, fine art, craft, architecture, design and installation art, can now be found in internationally in art and design museums.

Hicks's work is characterised by her direct examination of indigenous weaving practices in the countries of their origin. This has led her travel through five continents, studying the local culture in Mexico, France, Morocco, India, Chile, Sweden, Israel, Saudi Arabia, Japan and South Africa, developing relationships with designers, artisans, industrialists, architects, politicians and cultural leaders.

== Awards and recognition ==
- 1957–1958: Fulbright Program, grant to paint in Chile
- 1959–1960: Fribourg grant to paint in France
- 1975: American Institute of Architects, Medal
- 2010: Smithsonian Archives of American Art, Medal
- 2022: International Sculpture Center, Lifetime Achievement Award
- 2023: Art in Embassies, U.S. Department of State, Medal of Arts
- 2023: Chevalier de la Légion d'honneur, France
- 2025: American Academy of Arts and Letters, Elected Member

== Museum collections ==
- Addison Gallery of American Art (Andover, MA)
- The Art Institute of Chicago (Chicago, IL)
- Centre Georges Pompidou (Paris, France)
- Cleveland Museum of Art (Cleveland, OH)
- Cooper Hewitt, Smithsonian Design Museum (New York, NY)
- Institute for Advanced Study (Princeton, NJ)
- The Metropolitan Museum of Art (New York, NY)
- Minneapolis Institute of Art (Minneapolis, MN)
- Mint Museum (Charlotte, NC)
- Museum of Fine Arts, Boston (Boston, MA)
- Museum of Modern Art (New York, NY)
- Museum of Nebraska Art (Kearney, NE)
- National Crafts Museum (Japan)
- National Gallery of Art (Washington, DC)
- National Museum of Modern Art, Kyoto (Kyoto, Japan)
- Pérez Art Museum Miami (Miami, FL)
- Philadelphia Museum of Art (Philadelphia, PA)
- Smart Museum of Art (Chicago, IL)
- Smithsonian American Art Museum (Washington, D.C.)
- Stedelijk Museum (Amsterdam, the Netherlands)
- Tate Museum (London, England)
- Victoria and Albert Museum (London, UK)
- Wadsworth Atheneum (Hartford, CT)
- Yale Art Gallery (New Haven, CT)

== See also ==
- Fiber art
- Tapestry
- Yale School of Art
- Sculpture
