= Judas (Quelentaro album) =

Studio album by Quelentaro
- Released: 1970
- Label: EMI Odeón Chile

Quelentaro chronology
Coplas libertarias a la historia de Chile (1969)	Judas (1970)	Cesante (1972)

Judas is the fifth album from the Chilean musical group Quelentaro. It was released in 1970 on the EMI Odeón Chile label (catalog no. LDC 35266). A later re-issue of the album contains alternative tracks. All songs on the original album were written by brothers Eduardo and Gastón Guzmán. The cover photograph was by Patricio Guzmán.

== Track listing ==
Side A

1. "Judas" (Eduardo Guzmán, Gastón Guzmán] (10:39]
2. "Don Zambrano" (1a. versión) (Eduardo Guzmán, Gastón Guzmán) [2:35]
3. "Por vendimias" (1a. versión) (Eduardo Guzmán, Gastón Guzmán) [5:24]

Side B

1. "Copla del sembrador" (Eduardo Guzmán, Gastón Guzmán) [9:53]
2. "Lorenzo Sánchez" (Eduardo Guzmán, Gastón Guzmán) [3:14]
3. "Veneno negro" (Eduardo Guzmán, Gastón Guzmán) [2:56]
4. "Destino vegetal" (Eduardo Guzmán, Gastón Guzmán) [4:07]
