= Recordando a Chile =

Studio album by Violeta Parra
- Released: 1965
- Recorded: Aug.–Oct. 1964; Aug. 1965
- Genre: Chilean folklore
- Length: 34:16
- Label: EMI Odeón

Violeta Parra chronology
El folklore de Chile según Violeta Parra (1962)	Recordando a Chile (1965)	Carpa de La Reina (1966)

Recordando a Chile, also known as Una Chilena en París, is an album from Violeta Parra released on the EMI Odeón label (LDC-36533) in the summer of 1965. It was recorded during Parra's stay in Santiago between August 14 and October 21, 1964, and after her return from Europe in approximately August 1965. Tracks 2, 3, 5, 6, 10, and 11 were recorded in stereo and are believed to be from the 1965 sessions. The album cover features artwork by Violeta Parra.

Isabel Parra provided percussion and additional vocals on track 4 and chorus on tracks 2 and 6. Angel Parra provided guitar and chorus on tracks 2 and 6. Nicanor Parra recited the words on track 1. Hilda Parra provided the chorus on track 6. Rafael Berríos Rabanito played the accordion on track 6. Members of the Chico Reyes Orchestra provided backing on track 3.

== Track listing ==
1. "Defensa de Violeta Parra" (Nicanor Parra), recited by Nicanor Parra with Violeta playing in the background and humming "Tema libre No. 2"
2. "Mañana me voy pa’l norte" (Violeta Parra)
3. "Qué he sacado con quererte" (Violeta Parra)
4. "El diablo en el paraíso" (Violeta Parra) (duet with Isabel Parra)
5. "A la una nací yo" o [A la una] (traditional Chilean)
6. "Une chilienne à Paris" (Violeta Parra)
7. "Paloma ausente" (Violeta Parra)
8. "Arriba quemando el sol" o [Y arriba quemando el sol] (Violeta Parra)
9. "Julián Grimau" o [Qué dirá el Santo Padre] (Violeta Parra)
10. "Pedro Urdemales" (traditional Chilean)
11. "Écoute moi, petit" (Violeta Parra)
