= La cueca presentada por Violeta Parra =

La cueca

Studio album by Violeta Parra
- Released: 1959
- Recorded: October 1958
- Genre: Chilean folklore
- Length: 44:19
- Label: Odeón

Violeta Parra chronology
El folklore de Chile Volumen 2 (1958)	La cueca (1959)	Tonadas (1959)

La cueca presentada por Violeta Parra, also known as El folklore de Chile Volumen 3, is an album by Violeta Parra released on the Odeón label in early 1959. It was the third full-length album by Parra and part of Odeón's "El folclore de Chile" series to which Parra contributed five albums. The album contains 24 songs in the cueca genre. The cueca is the Chilean national dance, and the songs were collected between November 1957 and January 1958 in the central region of Chile between Santiago and Concepción. The sole original composition is "Cueca larga de Los Meneses" which was written by Parra and her brother, the "anti-poet" Nicanor Parra.

The album cover was designed by the Chilean painter Julio Escámez. The liner notes consisted of eight pages and were written by Gastón Soublette.

== Track listing ==
Side A

1. Introduction and commentary (spoken) (Violeta Parra) 1:48
2. "La cueca del balance" 2:39
3. "Adiós que se va Segundo" 1:31
4. "Floreció el copihue rojo" 1:36
5. "Un viejo mi pidió un beso" 1:31
6. "Cueca del organillo" 1:26
7. "Cuando estaba chiquillona" 1:34
8. "Una chiquilla en Arauco" 1:43
9. "Quisiera ser palomita" 1:34
10. "En el cuarto de la Carmela" 1:28
11. "La muerte se fue a bañar" 1:36
12. "De las piernas de un zancudo" 1:28
13. "Dame de tu pelo rubio" 1:29

Side B

1. Commentary (spoken) (Violeta Parra) 1:21
2. Yo vide llorar un hombre" 1:37
3. Tengo de hacer un retrato" 1:42
4. Pañuelo blanco me diste" 1:34
5. Cueca del payaso" 1:54
6. La mariposa" 1:44
7. Para qué me casaría" 1:24
8. Cueca valseada" 1:24
9. La niña que está bailando" 1:43
10. Cueca de armónica" 1:14
11. Dicen que el ají ma'úro" 1:39
12. En la cumbre de Los Andes" 1:37
13. Cueca larga de Los Meneses (Segundo pie)" (Nicanor Parra, Violeta Parra) 4:26
14. Final words (spoken) (Violeta Parra) 0:51

== Musicians ==
- Violeta Parra - voice, guitar, percussion in "Quisiera ser palomita", "De las piernas de un zancudo", "En el cuarto de la Carmela" y "Cueca larga de Los Meneses (Segundo pie)", harmonica in "Cueca de armónica"
- Isabel Parra - voice in "Cueca del balance" and "En la cumbre de Los Andes"
- Raúl Acevedo Ayala - Organillo in "Cueca del organillo"
- Óscar Parra ("Tony Canarito") - animation spoken in "Cueca del payaso"
- Circus band (unidentified) on "Cueca del payaso"
- Unidentified musicians playing piano, guitars, double bass, pandero and güiro on "En la cumbre de Los Andes"
