= Coplas al viento =

Studio album by Conjunto Quelentaro
- Released: 1967
- Label: Odeón Chile

Conjunto Quelentaro chronology
Coplas al viento (1967)	Huella campesina (1968)

Coplas al viento is the first album from the Chilean musical group Conjunto Quelentaro. It was released in 1967 on the Odeón Chile label.

== Track listing ==
Side A

1. "Coplas al Viento" (Gastón Guzmán) [16:36]
2. "Junto al Estero" (Del folklore) [3:28]

Side B

1. "Soy de Barro" (Eladio López) [2:37]
2. "El Letrado" (Eduardo Guzmán, Gastón Guzmán) [2:50]
3. "Alma en Pena" (Eladio López) [2:08]
4. "Mi Juana" (Del folklore) [2:43]
5. "Oración del Minero" (Eduardo Guzmán, Gastón Guzmán) [3:35]
6. "Allá en la Pampa Argentina" (Del folklore) [2:25]
7. "Camino en Guando" (Eduardo Guzmán, Gastón Guzmán) [3:23]
