= Tonadas (Violeta Parra album) =

Studio album by Violeta Parra
- Released: September 1959
- Genre: Chilean folklore
- Length: 51:16
- Label: Odeón

Violeta Parra chronology
La cueca presentada por Violeta Parra (1959)	Tonadas (1959)	Toda Violeta Parra (1960)

Tonadas, also known as La tonada presentada por Violeta Parra and El folklore de Chile Volumen 4, is an album by Violeta Parra released on the Odeón label in September 1959. It was the fourth full-length album by Parra and part of Odeón's "El folclore de Chile" series to which Parra contributed five albums. The album contains 15 songs in the tonada genre. The album consists mainly of songs collected in 1959 in the central zone of the Chilean countryside.

The album cover was designed by the Chilean painter Nemesio Antúnez. The original release included a six-page booklet of liner notes which are unattributed.

== Track listing ==
Side A

1. "Adónde vas, jilguerillo" 3:57
2. "Atención, mozos solteros" 2:39
3. "Cuando salí de mi casa" 5:26
4. "Si lo que amo tiene dueño" 3:39
5. "Cuándo habrá cómo casarse" 2:38
6. "Un reo siendo variable" 3:24
7. "Si te hallas arrepentido" 2:19

Side B

1. "Las tres pollas negras" 3:52
2. "Una naranja me dieron" 2:48
3. "Huyendo voy de tus rabias" 3:52
4. "El joven para casarse" 2:07
5. "Tan demudado te he visto" 3:54
6. "Yo tenía en mi jardín" 2:25
7. "Imposible que la luna" 3:44
8. "Blancaflor y Filumena" 4:03
