= Chants et Danses du Chili II =

Studio album by Violeta Parra
- Released: November 1956
- Recorded: March 26, 1956
- Genre: Chilean folklore
- Length: 15:29
- Label: Le Chant du Monde

Violeta Parra chronology
Chants et Danses du Chili I (1956)	Chants et Danses du Chili II (1956)	Canto y guitarra (1957)

Chants et Danses du Chili II is an extended play record by Violeta Parra released on the Le Chant du Monde label in November 1956. It was the Parra's second extended play record. The release contains eight songs recorded in Paris on March 26, 1956, at the same session that resulted in "Chants et Danses du Chili I, released two months earlier. Parra toured Europe in 1955 after winning the Caupolicán prize in 1954.

The album cover features a drawing by S. Sechi. A subsequent reissue of Parra's French recordings, released in 1975 as "Cantos de Chile", includes Parra's spoken introduction of the songs.

== Track listing ==
1. "Parabienes a los novios" o [Viva la luz de don Creador] (traditional Chilean)
2. "Ausencia" (Tomás Gabino Ortiz)
3. "El palomo" (traditional Chilean)
4. "Dicen que el ají maduro" o [El ají ma’uro] (traditional Chilean)
5. "Viva Dios, viva la Virgen" o [Parabienes a los novios] (traditional Chilean)
6. "A lu lu" o [En el portal de Belén] (traditional Chilean)
7. "Verso por el Apocalipsis" o [El primer día el Señor] (traditional Chilean)
8. "Meriana" (traditional pascuense)
