= El folklore de Chile Volumen 2 =

Acompañándose en guitarra

Studio album by Violeta Parra
- Released: September 1958
- Recorded: March–April 1958
- Genre: Chilean folklore
- Length: 51:12
- Label: Odeón

Violeta Parra chronology
Canto y guitarra	Acompañándose en guitarra	La cueca presentada por Violeta Parra

El folklore de Chile Volumen 2, also known as Acompañándose en guitarra, is an album by Violeta Parra released on the Odeón label in 1958. It was the second full-length album by Parra. The album features Parra singing and accompanying herself on guitar. The album contains 16 songs, including songs collected in the countryside and original compositions.

The album included liner notes by Raúl Aicardi. The album cover features art by Chilean painter Julio Escámez. It was recorded between April and May 1958 and released in September 1958.

== Track listing ==
Side A

1. Verso por el rey Asuero (Canto a lo divino) 3:10
2. Adiós corazón amante (Tonada maulina) 3:03
3. Bella joven (Vals) 2:04
4. Ya me voy a separar (Tonada punteada) 4:25
5. Verso por las doce palabras (Canto a lo divino) 3:40
6. Viva Dios, viva la Virgen (Parabienes) 2:41
7. La muerte con anteojos (Canto a lo humano) (Violeta Parra) 4:35
8. Niña hechicera (Mazurca) 2:30

Side B

1. Cueca larga de los Meneses (Cueca) (Nicanor Parra, Violeta Parra) 4:27
2. Amada prenda (Tonada de coleo) 2:37
3. Verso por desengaño (Canto a lo humano) (Violeta Parra) 5:00
4. La petaquita (Mazurca) 2:16
5. Tonada del medio (Tonada) 2:23
6. Verso por padecimiento (Canto a lo divino) 2:40
7. Tonada por ponderación (Canción punteada) 2:35
8. Yo también quiero casarme (Polka) 3:06
