= Nemesio Antúnez =

Chilean artist (1918–1993)

Nemesio Antúnez Zañartu
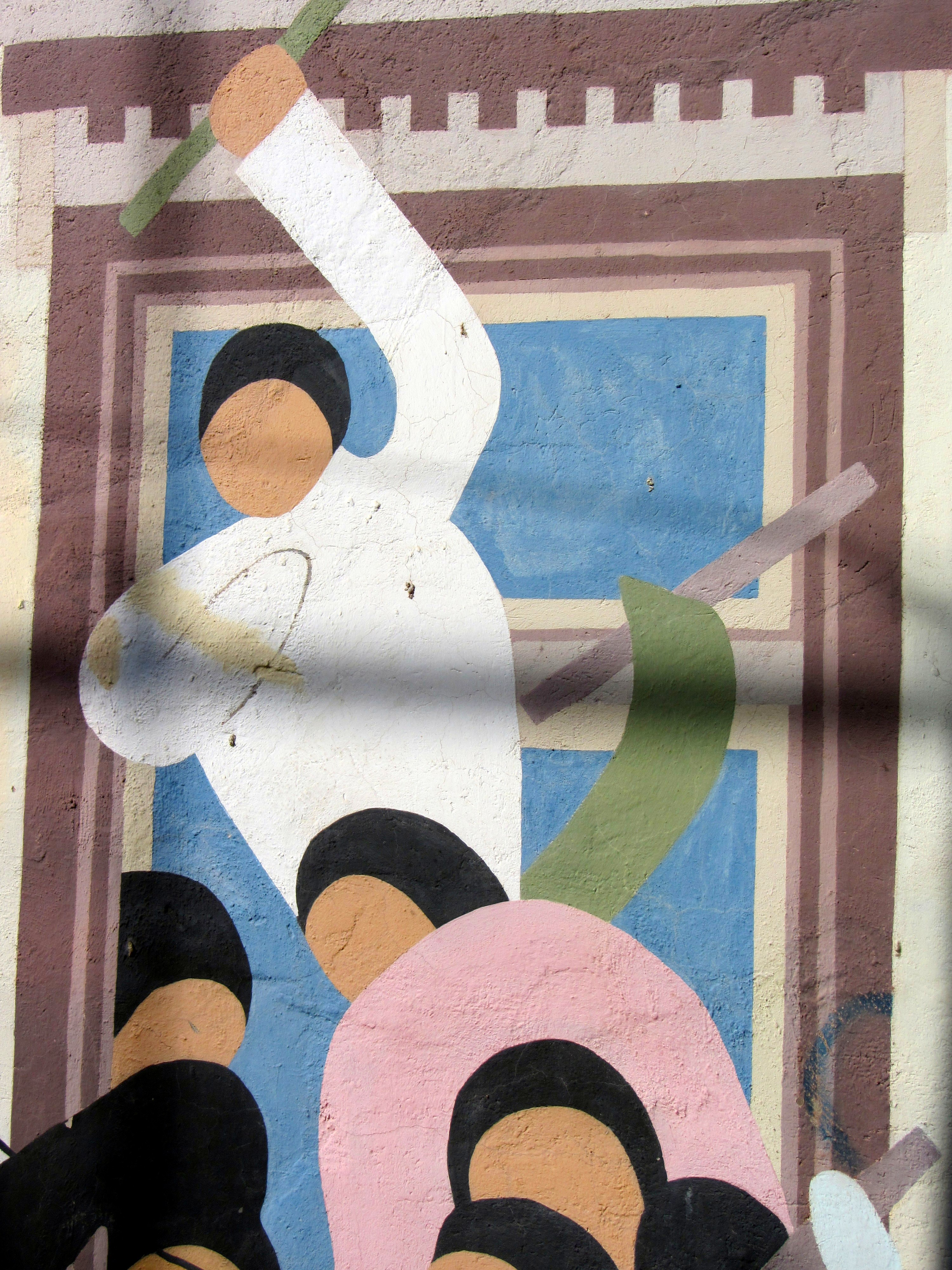
- Bailarines con volantines (detail); mural nº16 of the es:Museo a Cielo Abierto de Valparaíso
- Born: May 4, 1918; Santiago, Chile
- Died: May 19, 1993 (aged 75); Santiago, Chile
- Known for: Painting, engraving

Nemesio Antúnez Zañartu (Born in Santiago, May 4, 1918 - May 19, 1993) was a Chilean painter and engraver who founded Workshop 99.

== Biography ==
Born to Nemesio Antúnez and Luisa Zañartu, he was the eldest of three sons, all of whom became dedicated to art: Enrique Zañartu (6 September 1921 - 13 June 2000) became a painter and Jaime Antúnez (6 March 1923 - 10 May 2010) a sculptor. The couple also had a daughter named Laura (2 September 1919 - 30 July 2010).

He went to high school at the College of the Sacred Hearts of Santiago. At 17, he took first place at a French speaking competition and won a trip to France, where he learned about Pablo Picasso, Juan Gris and Joan Miró.

In 1938 he enrolled in the school of architecture at the Pontifical Catholic University of Chile, where he graduated in 1941. At the age of 25 he presented his first solo watercolor exhibition at the Chilean Institute of Culture.

Thanks to a scholarship from the Fulbright Program, he traveled to Columbia University in New York. Upon completing his master's degree in 1947, he began working in the studio Atelier 17 with Stanley William Hayter, who applied the techniques of printmaking to surrealist art. He worked with his brother Enrique to explore the possibilities of old printmaking techniques from artists like Yves Tanguy, Kurt Seligmann, Jacques Lipchitz and Joan Miró.

In 1950, the French branch of Atelier 17 was moved.

== Murals ==
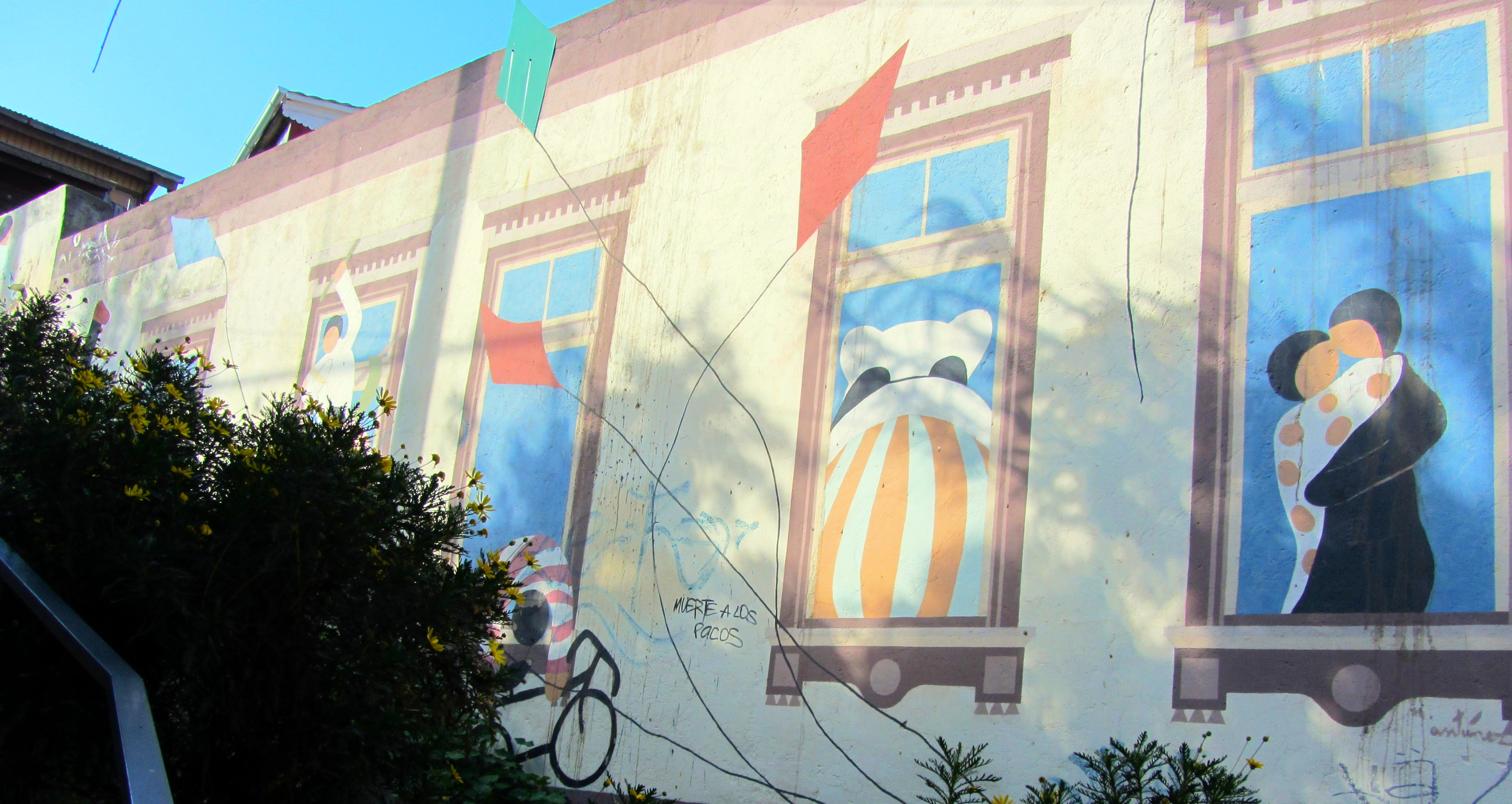
Detail of Bailarines con volantines, mural nº16 at the Open-air museum of Valparaíso.

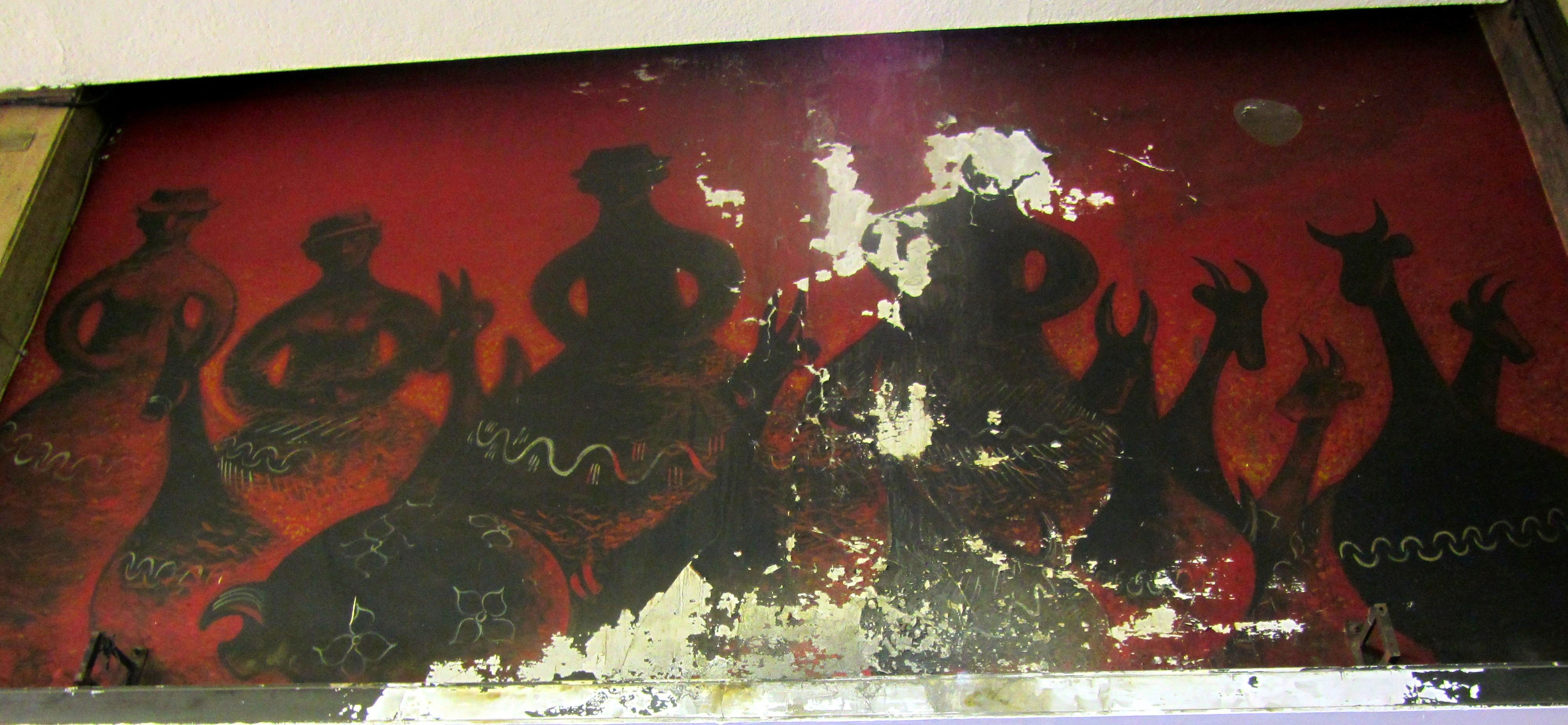
Quinchamalí, at the Juan Esteban Montero Gallery, Santiago (2013).

Antunez painted fifteen murals in total, only five of which are in Chile. Four are in Santiago - Luna, Quinchamalí, Sol and Terremoto - while one, No. 16, Bailarines con volantinesis, is in the Open-air museum of Valparaíso. Santiago's murals in Chile were declared national monuments in 2011, but their condition leaves something to be desired.

Terremoto ('earthquake'), painted in 1958, is over 30 square meters, and covers the whole vestibule wall of the Nile Cinema. The mural has visible cracking produced during the Earthquake in 2010.

In even worse conditions is Quinchamalí (1958) at the Juan Esteban Montero Gallery: the paint of the mural is peeling and warping due to the humidity. The art restorer Carolina Broschek maintains that the mural can be saved, but the owner of the building on which it is painted, Yusif Tala, opined that the Nemesio Antúnez Foundation should take care of the painting or move it to another place, as has no interest in preserving it. In the same gallery, besides the mural, Antúnez installed floor mosaics which are still in perfect condition.

The murals Sol and Luna have been more fortunate. Commissioned in 1955, they adorn the space between the Gran Palace cinema and theater. The murals incorporate gold and silver threads and sheets. Pablo Novoa, manager of the Gran Palace hotel, says that restoration will begin in 2015.

== Posthumous homage ==
The name of the painter is today held in exhibition halls, galleries, schools and streets in Chile.

In 1993 a stamp was minted in his honour which depicts Tanguería en Valparaíso. The following year, the Chilean Government created the "Commission Nemesio Antúnez", in charge of supervising laws concerning art.

== Gallery ==
Ceramics
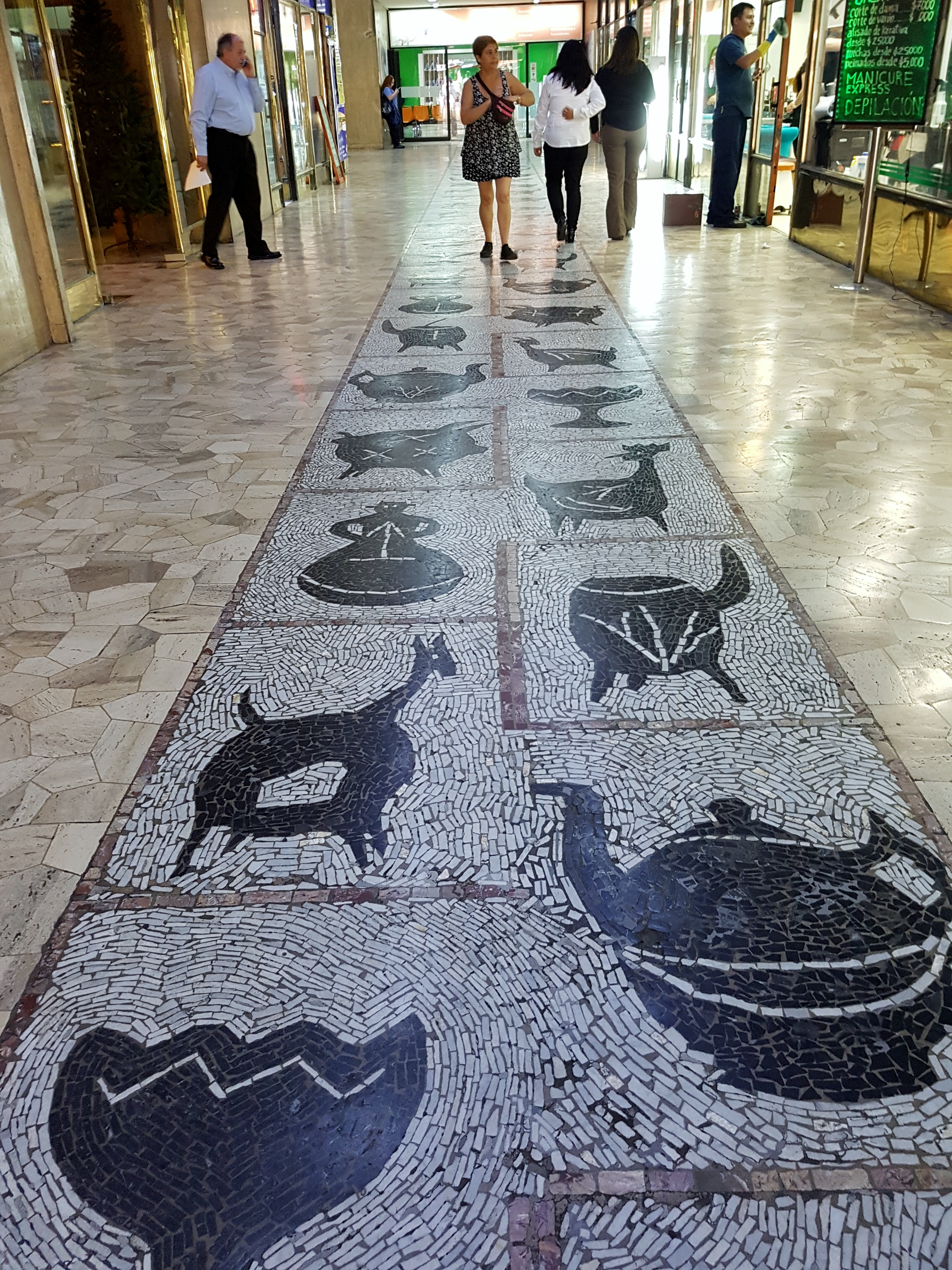

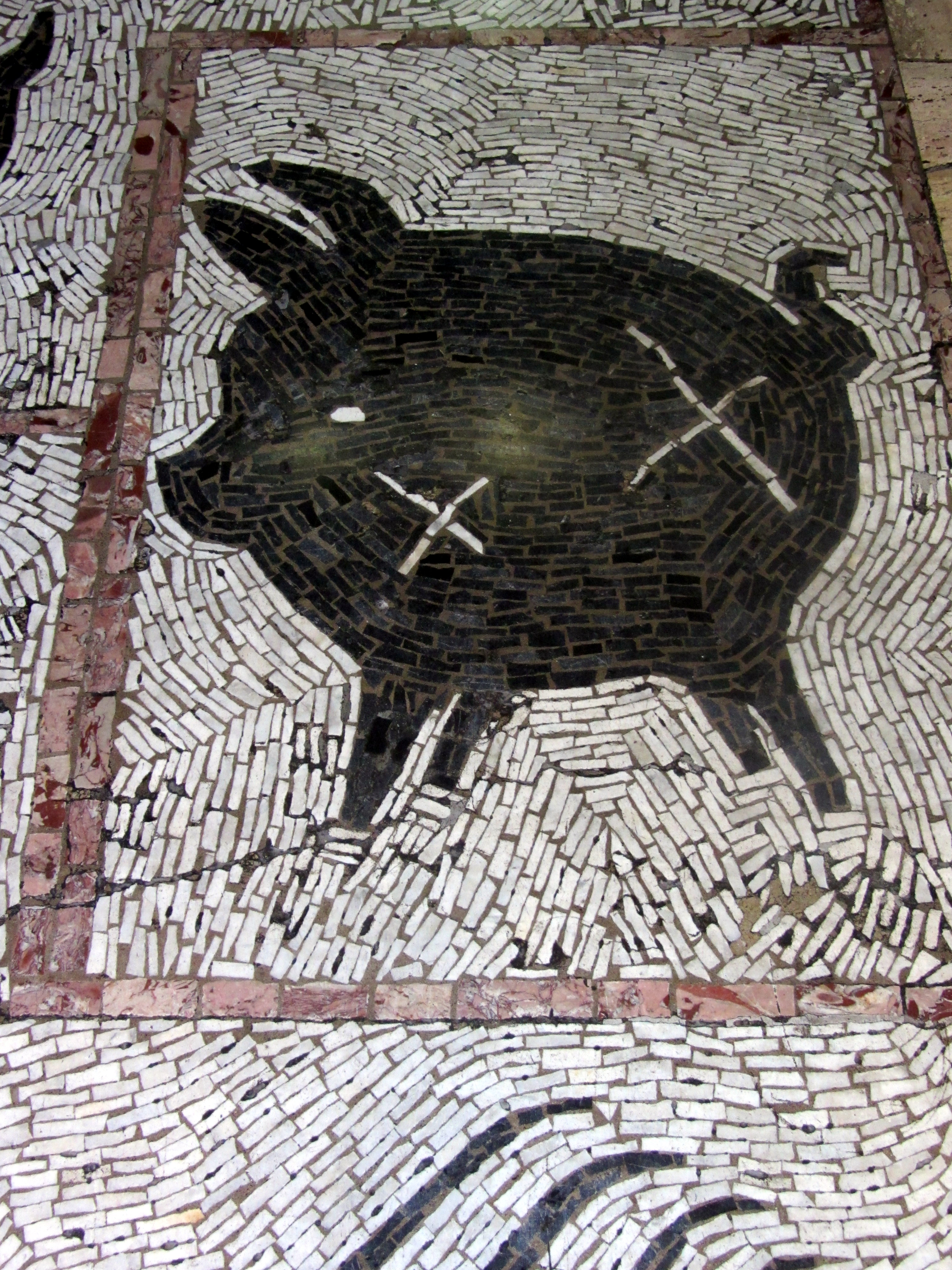

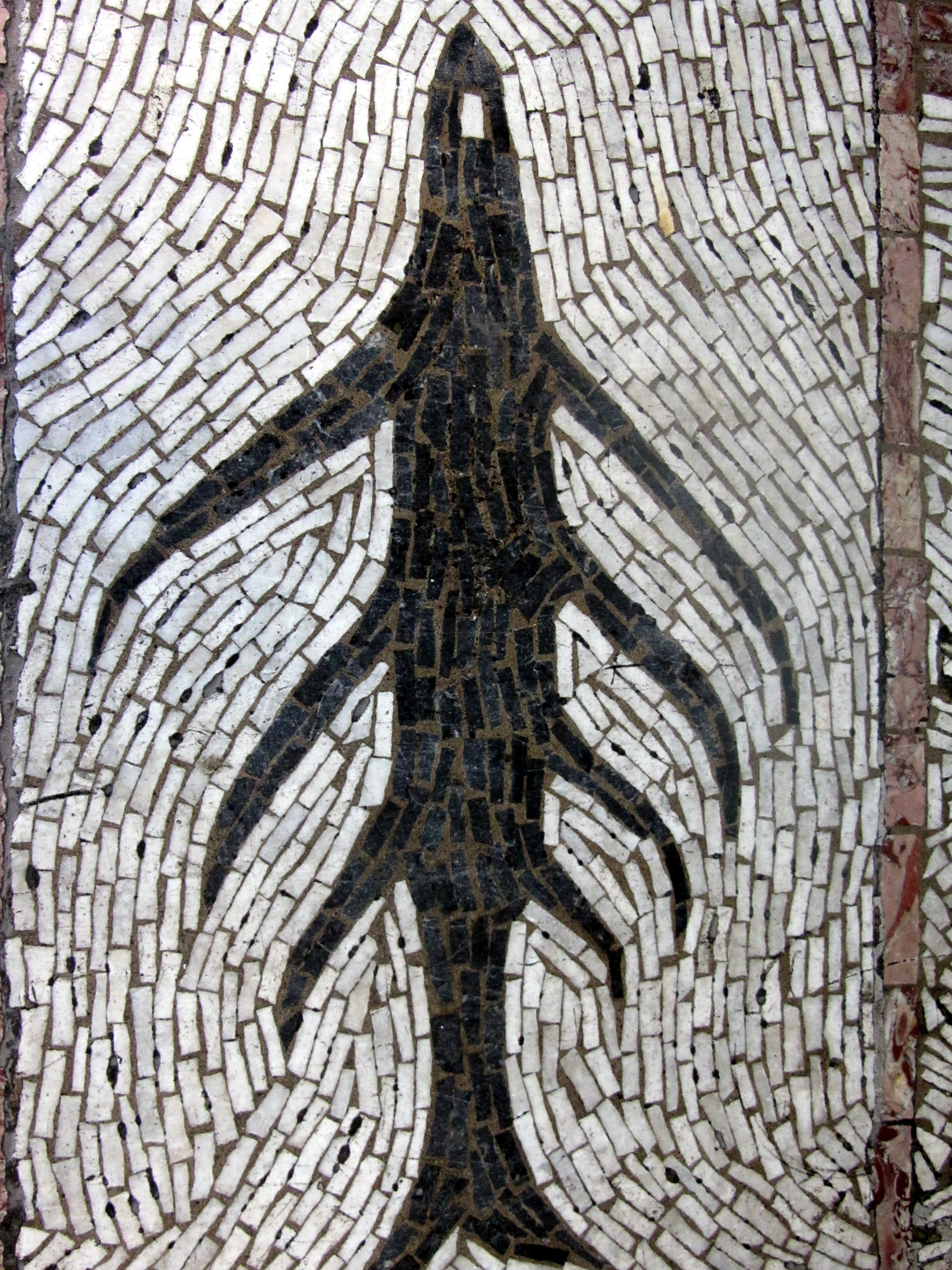

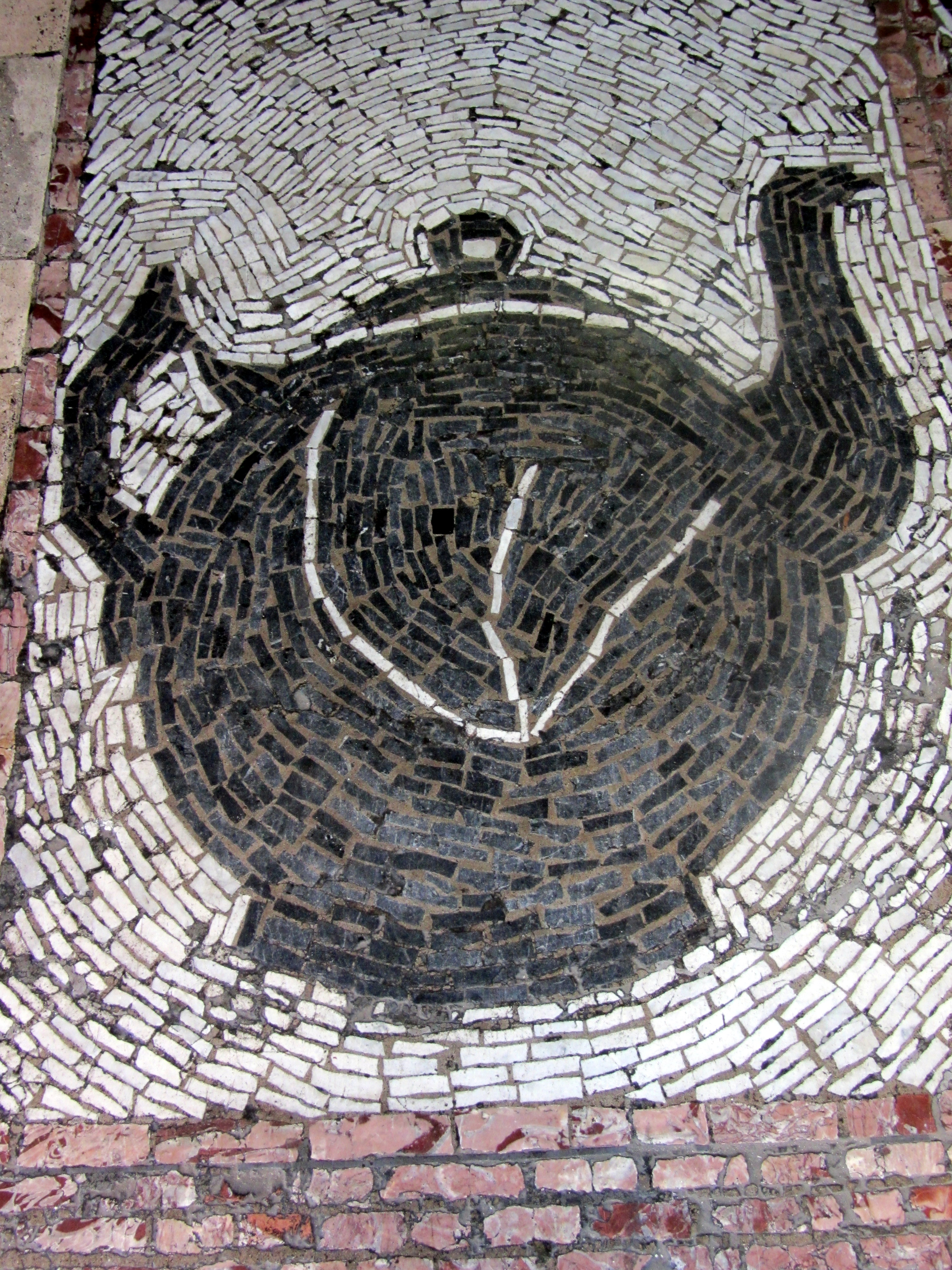

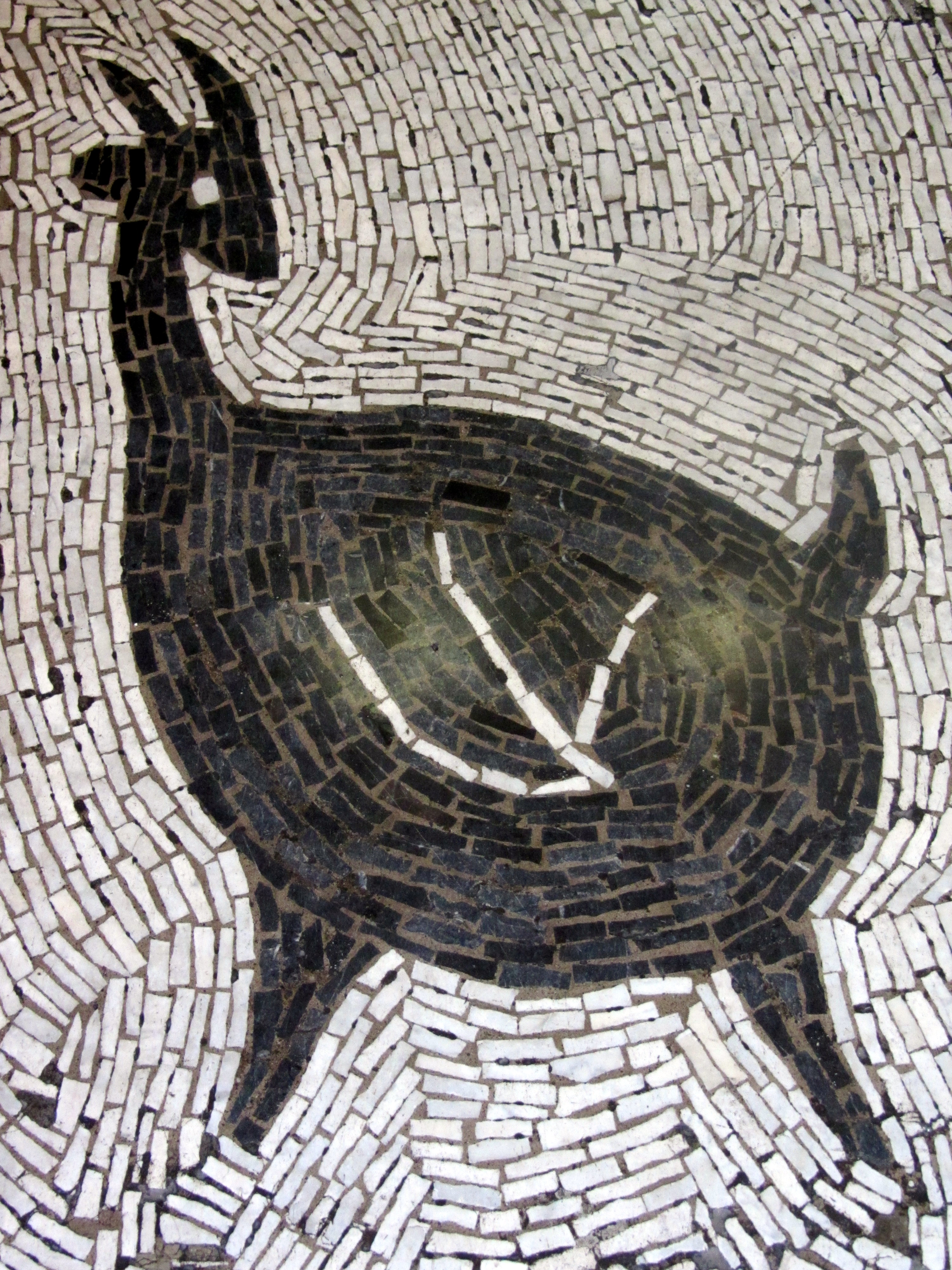

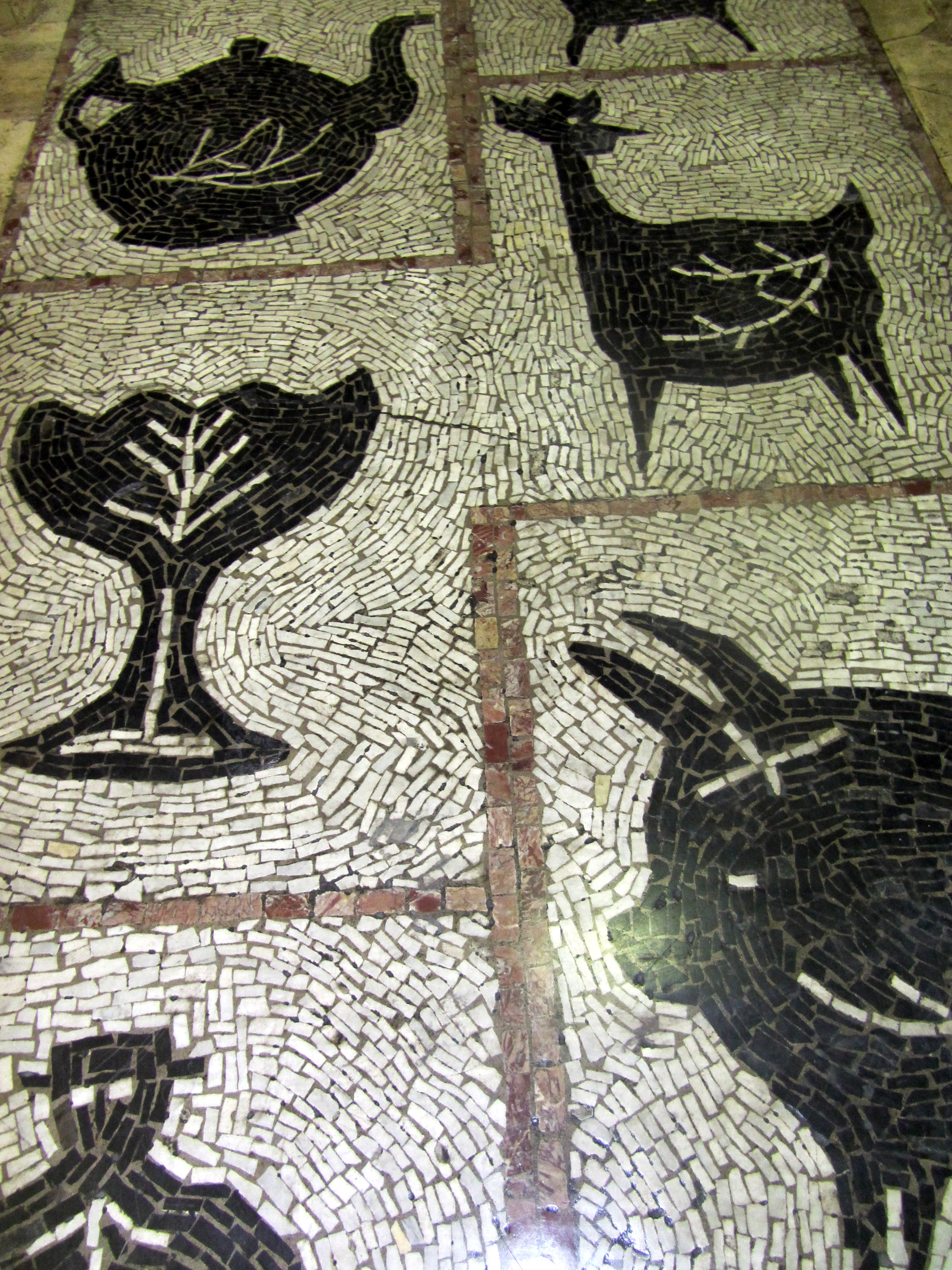
Murals
Bailarines con volantines
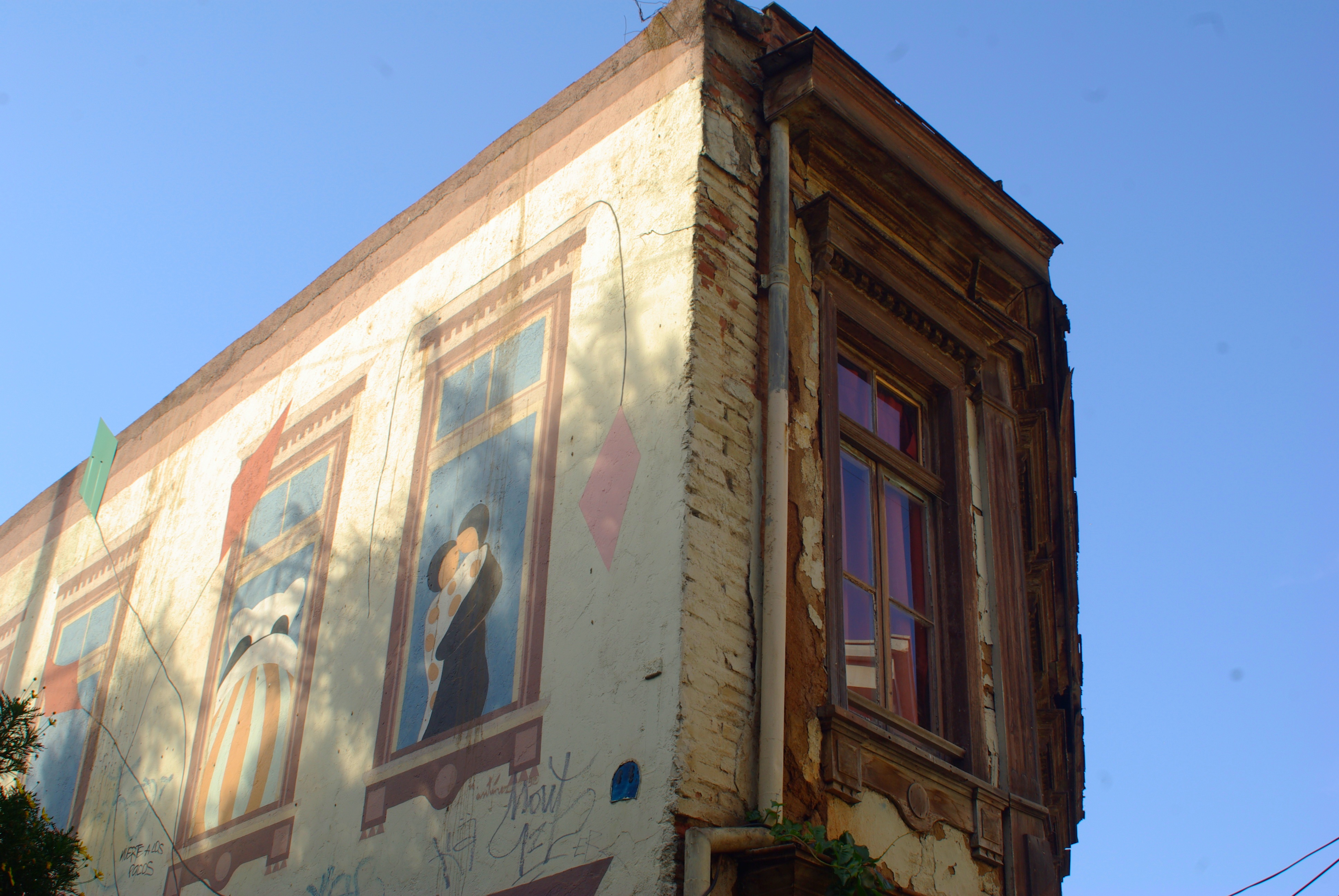

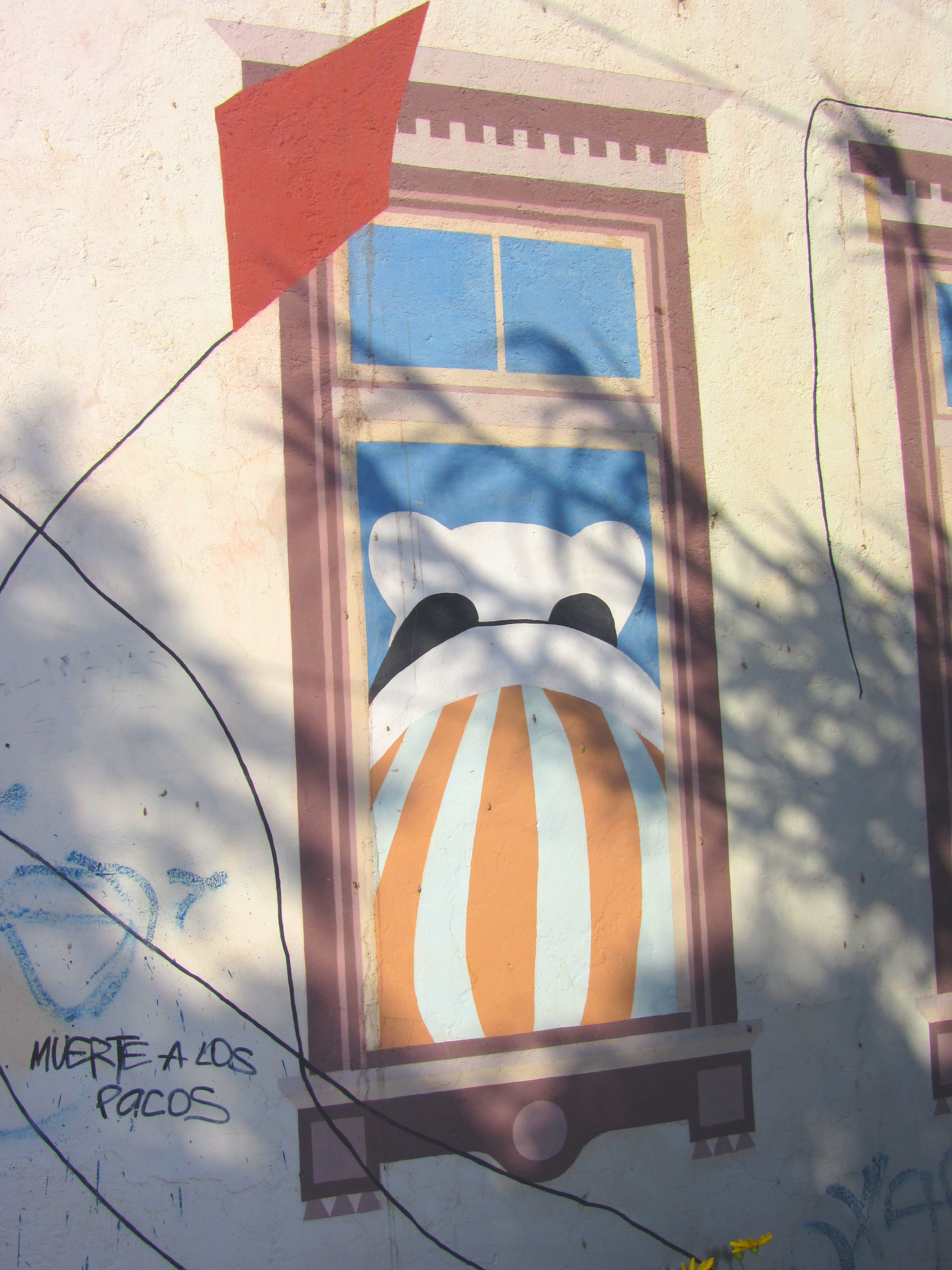

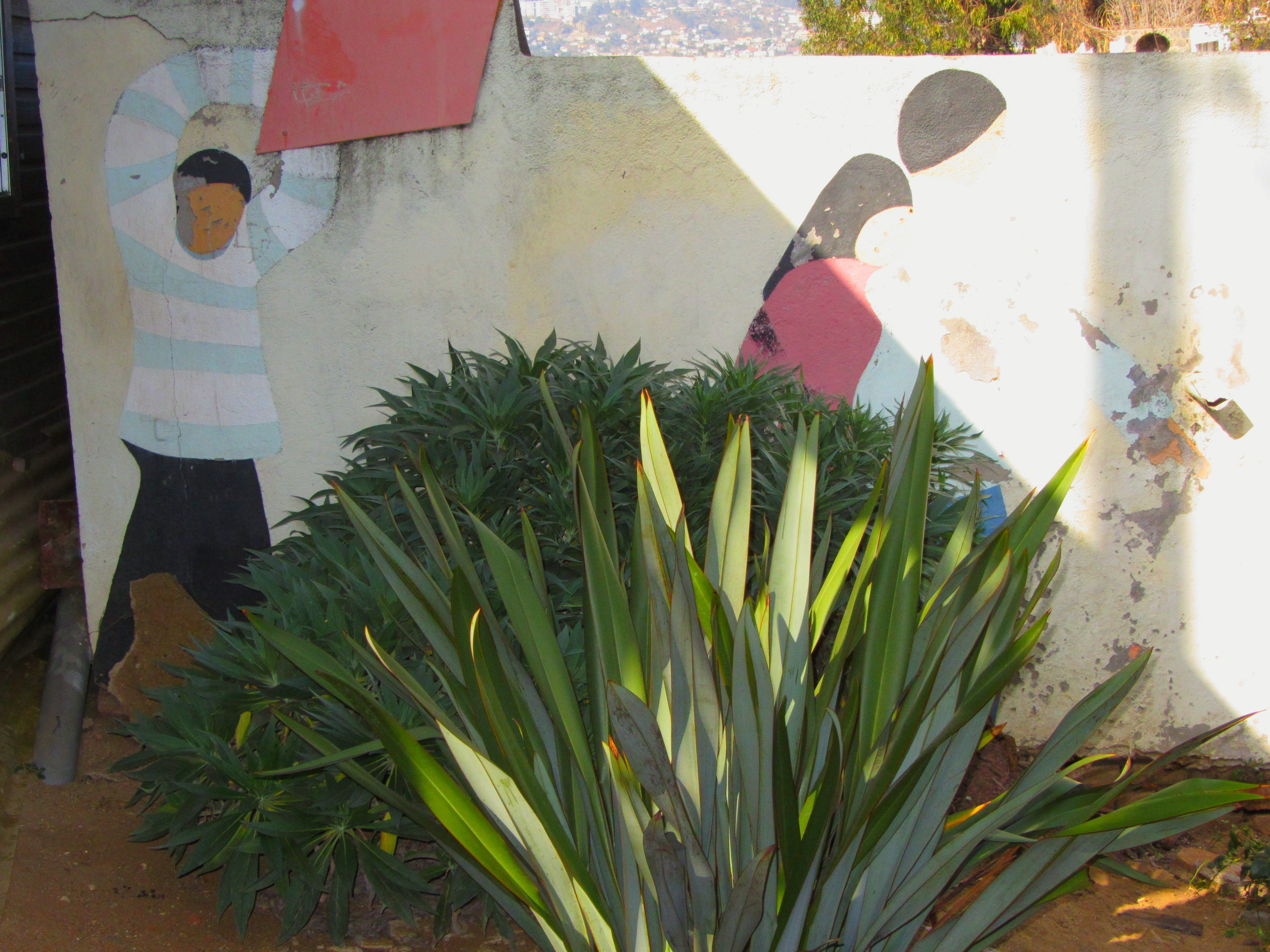

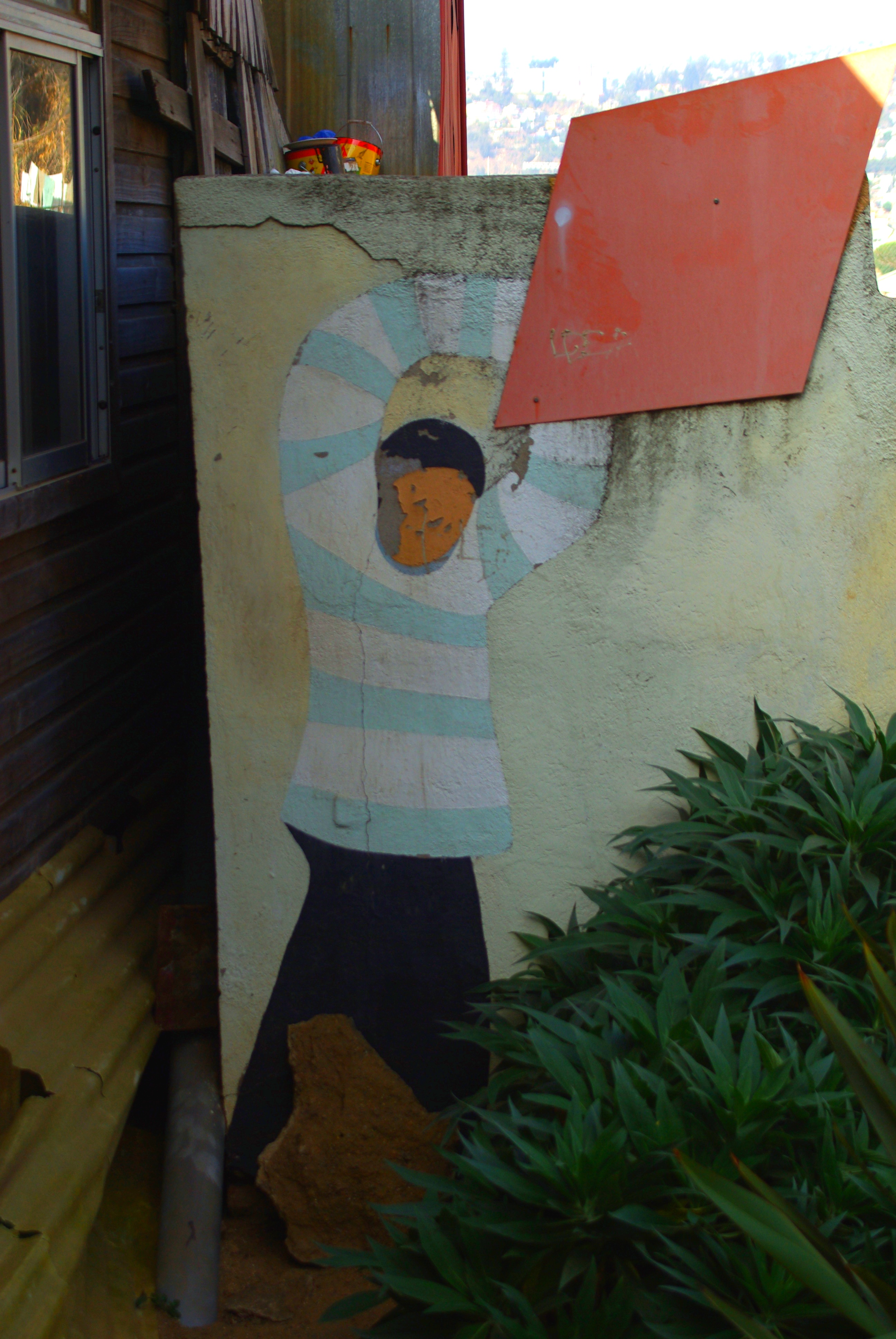

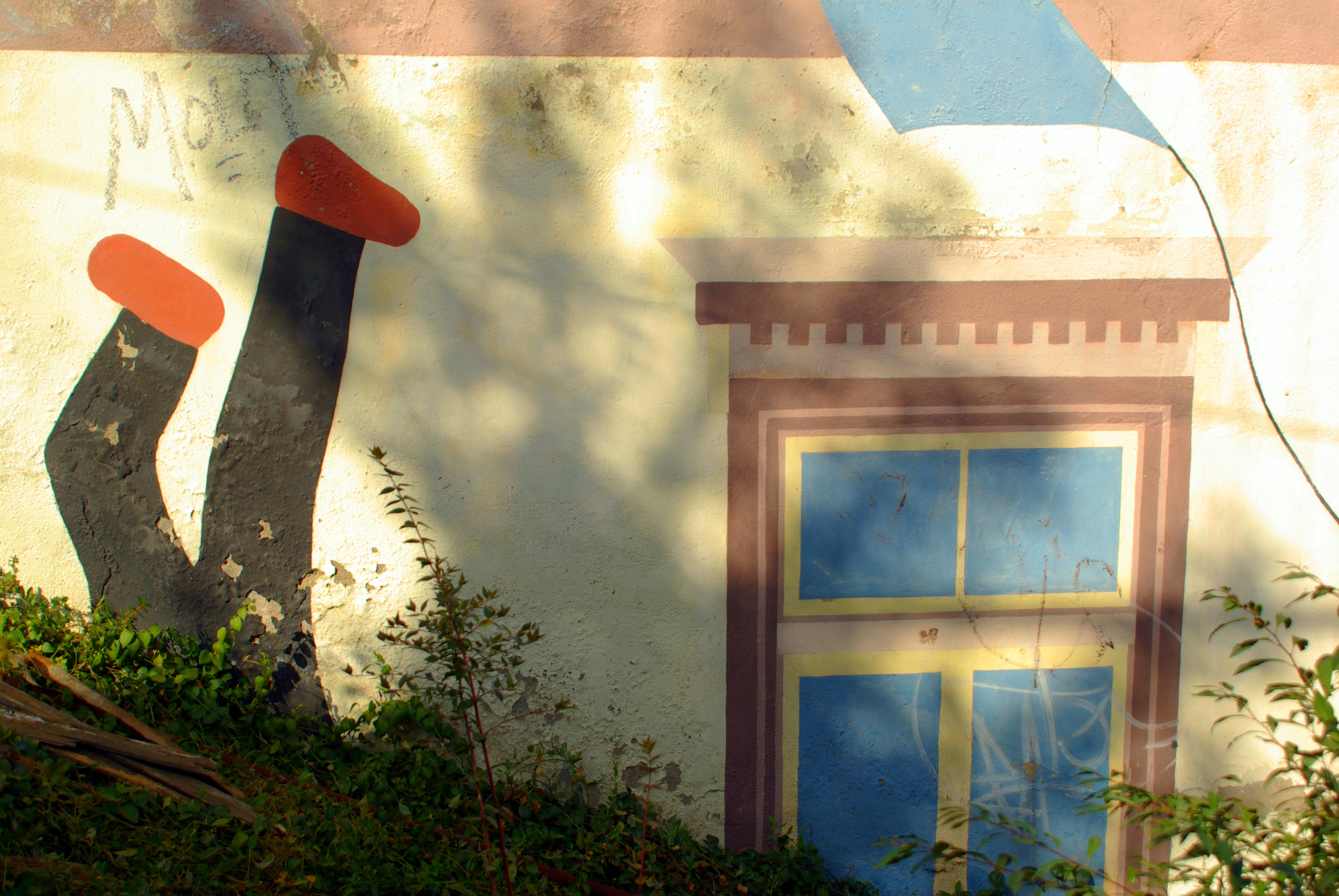
Quinchamalí
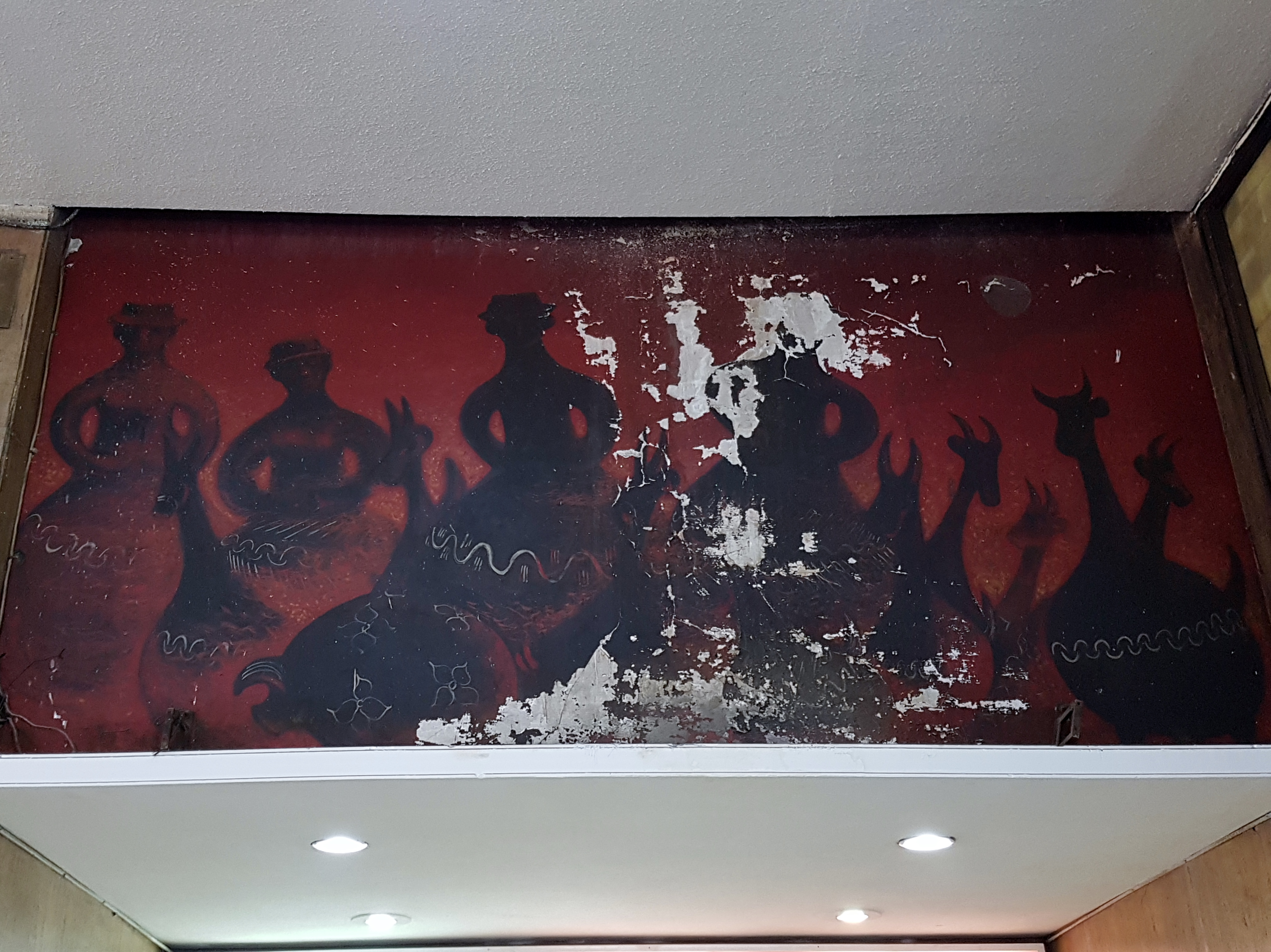

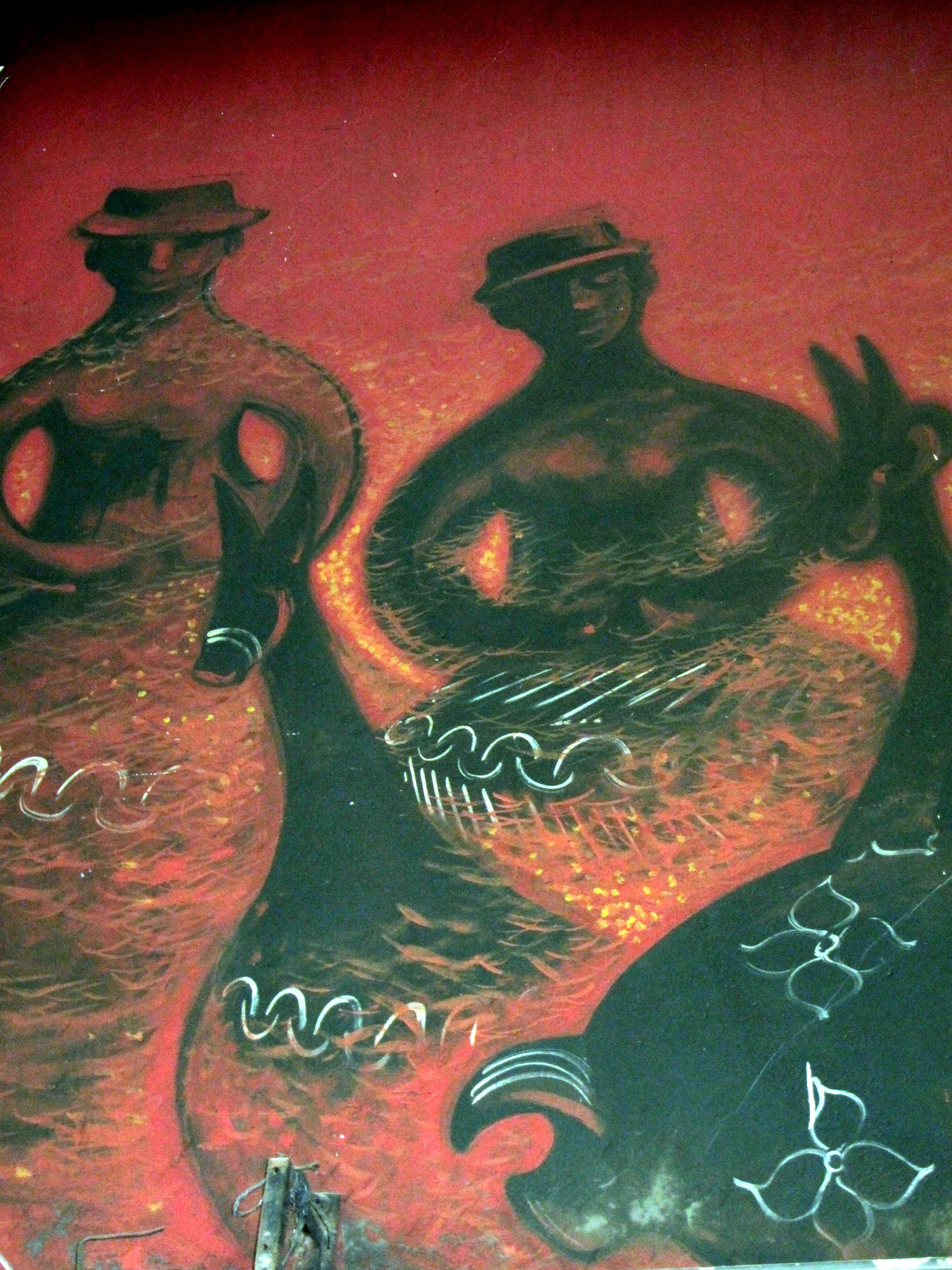

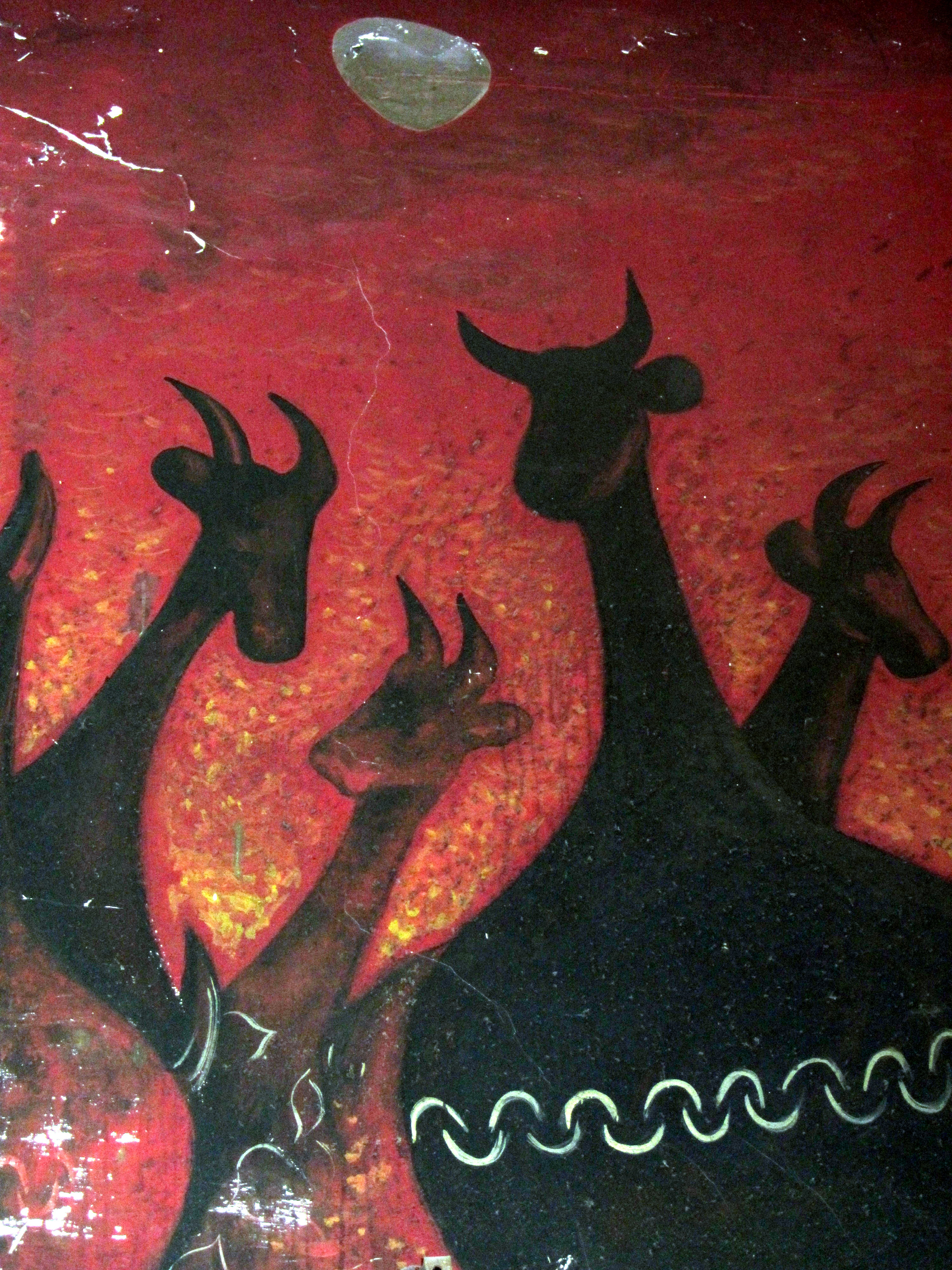

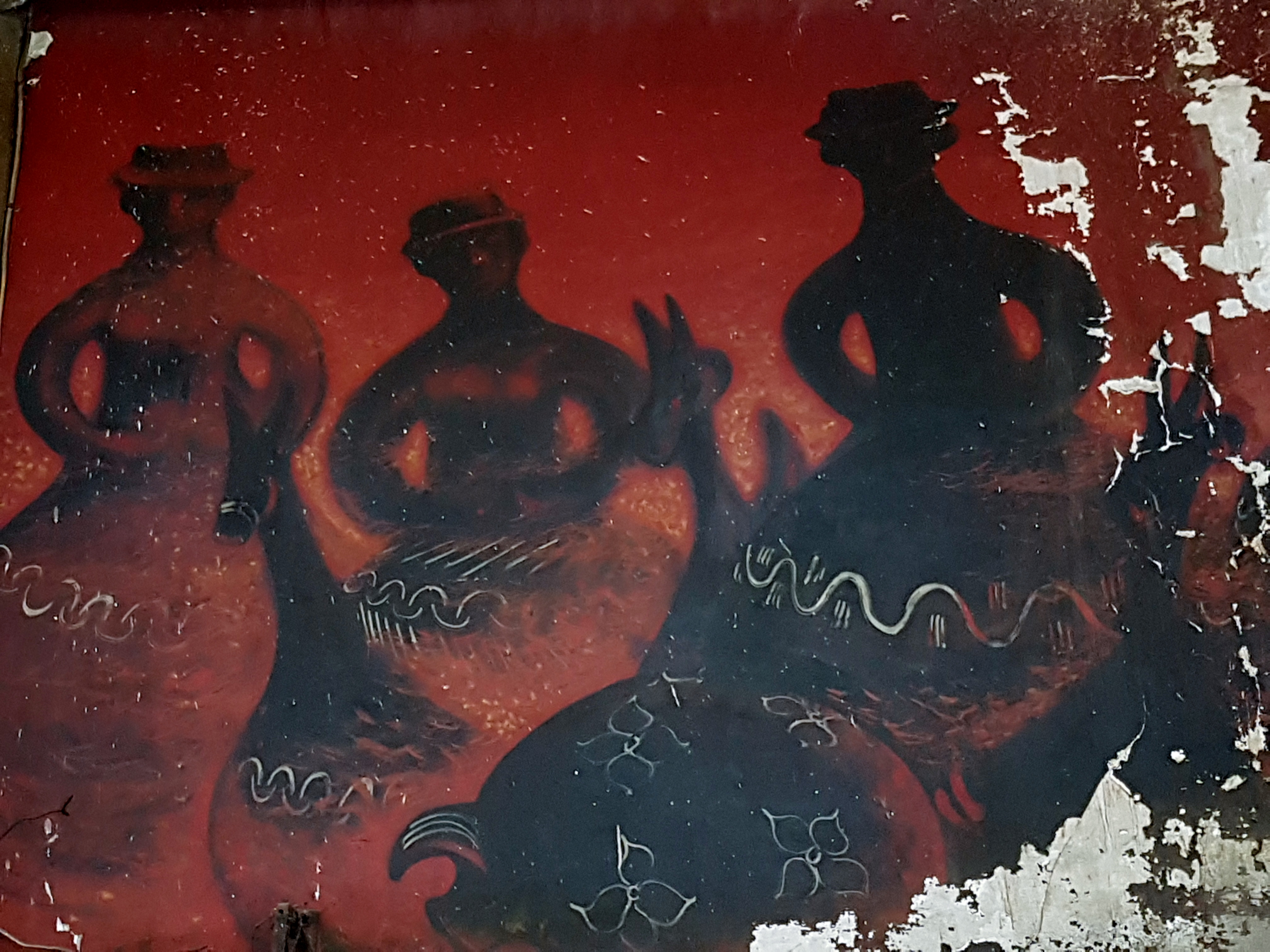
Terremoto
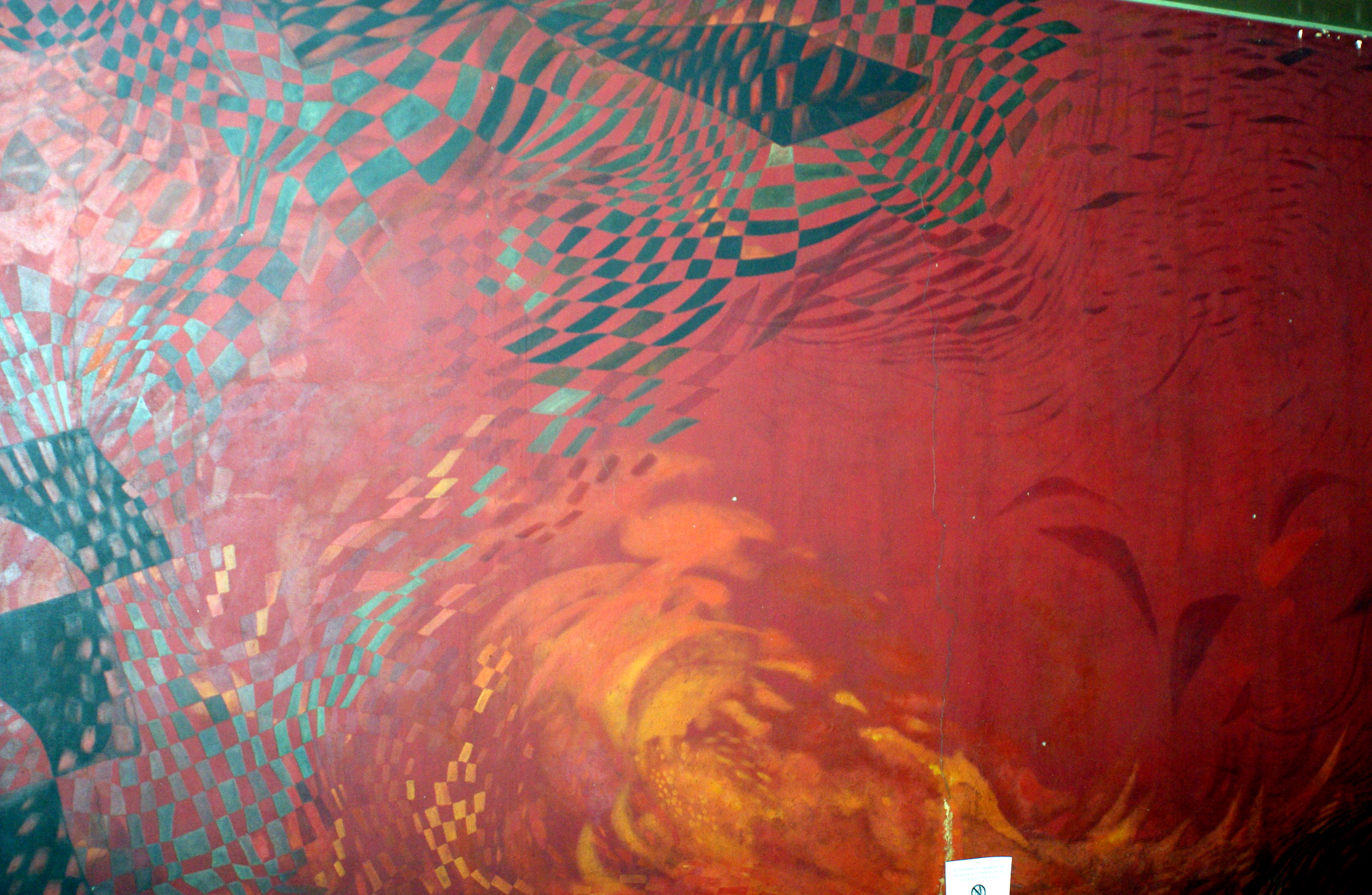

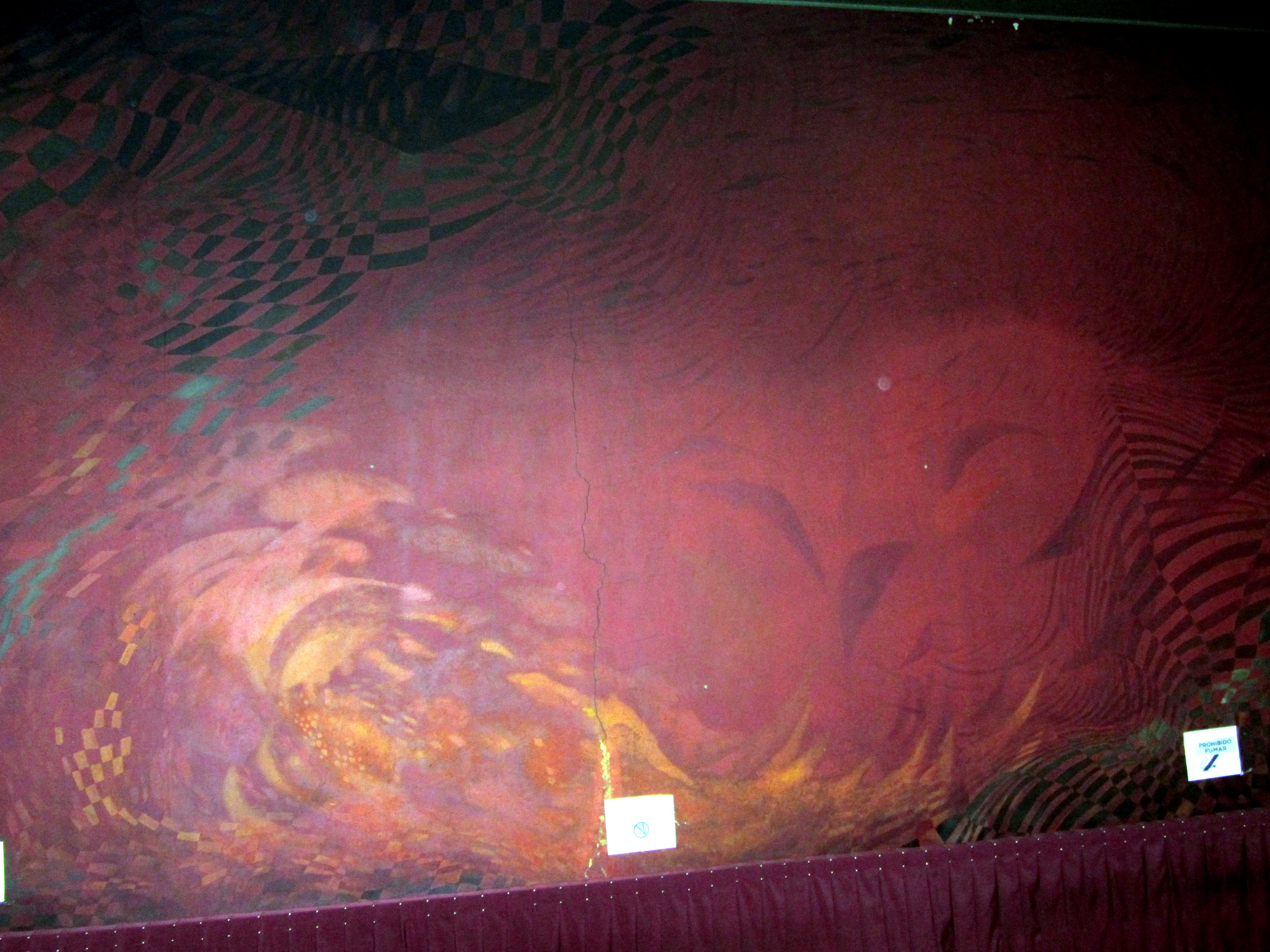

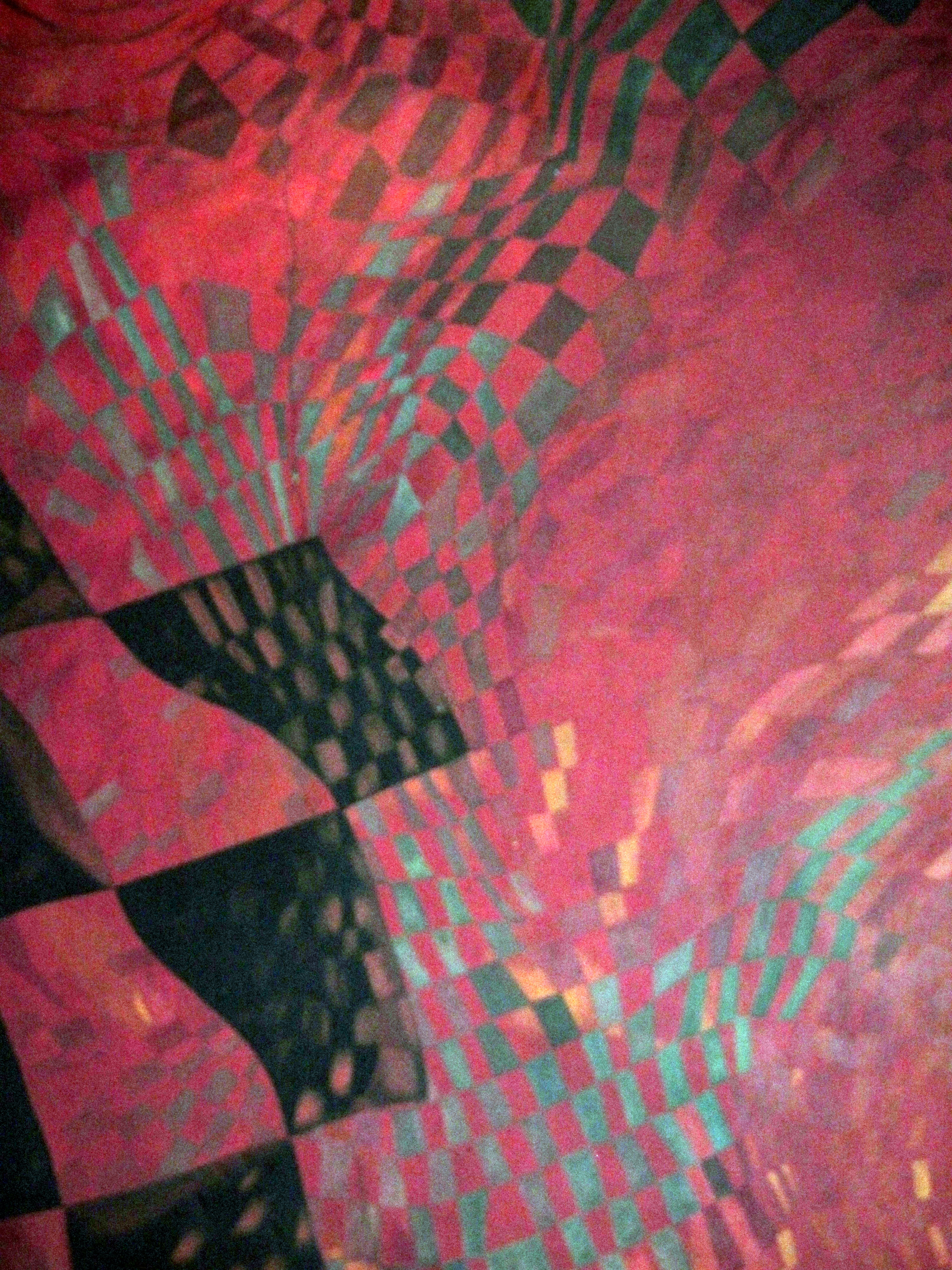

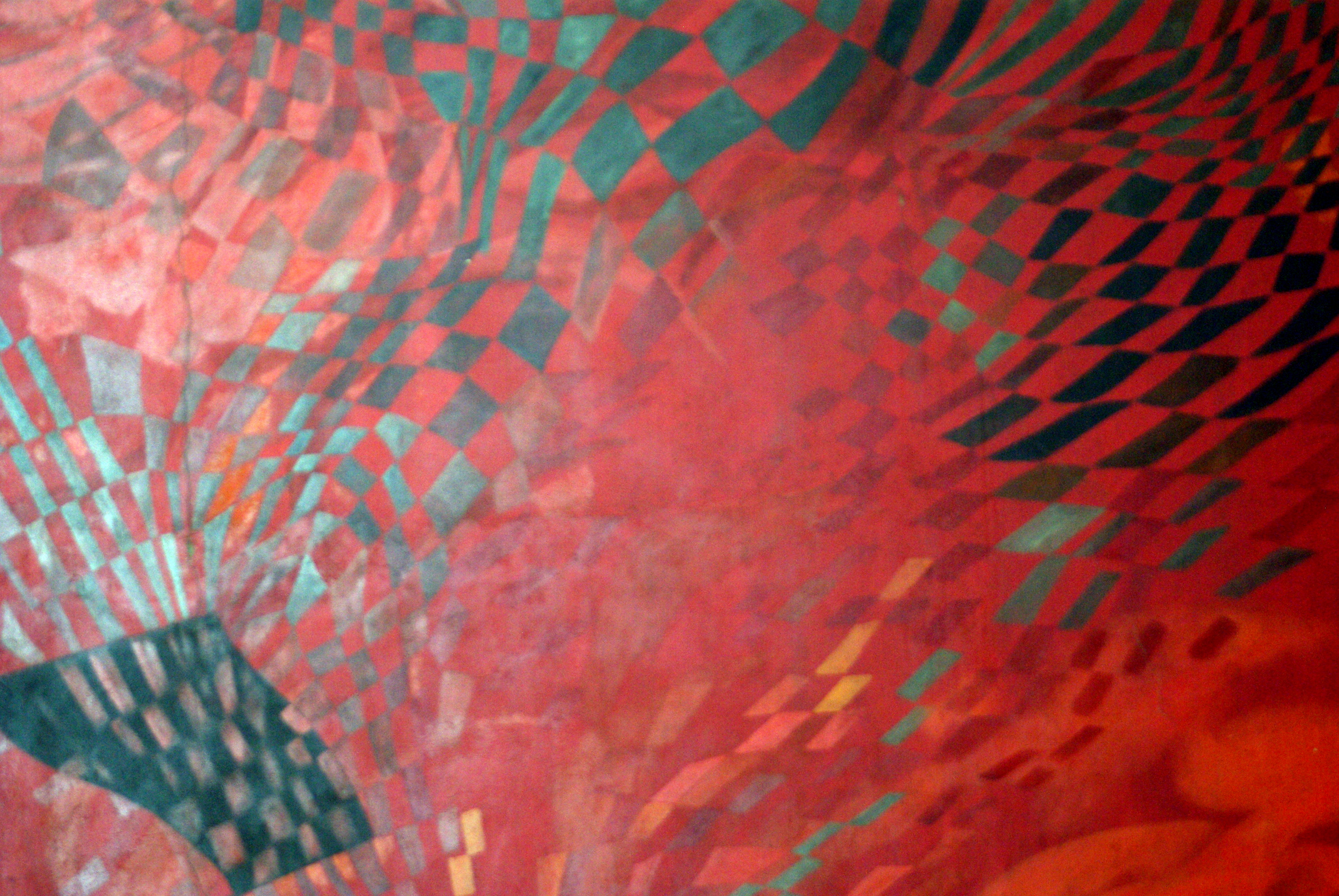

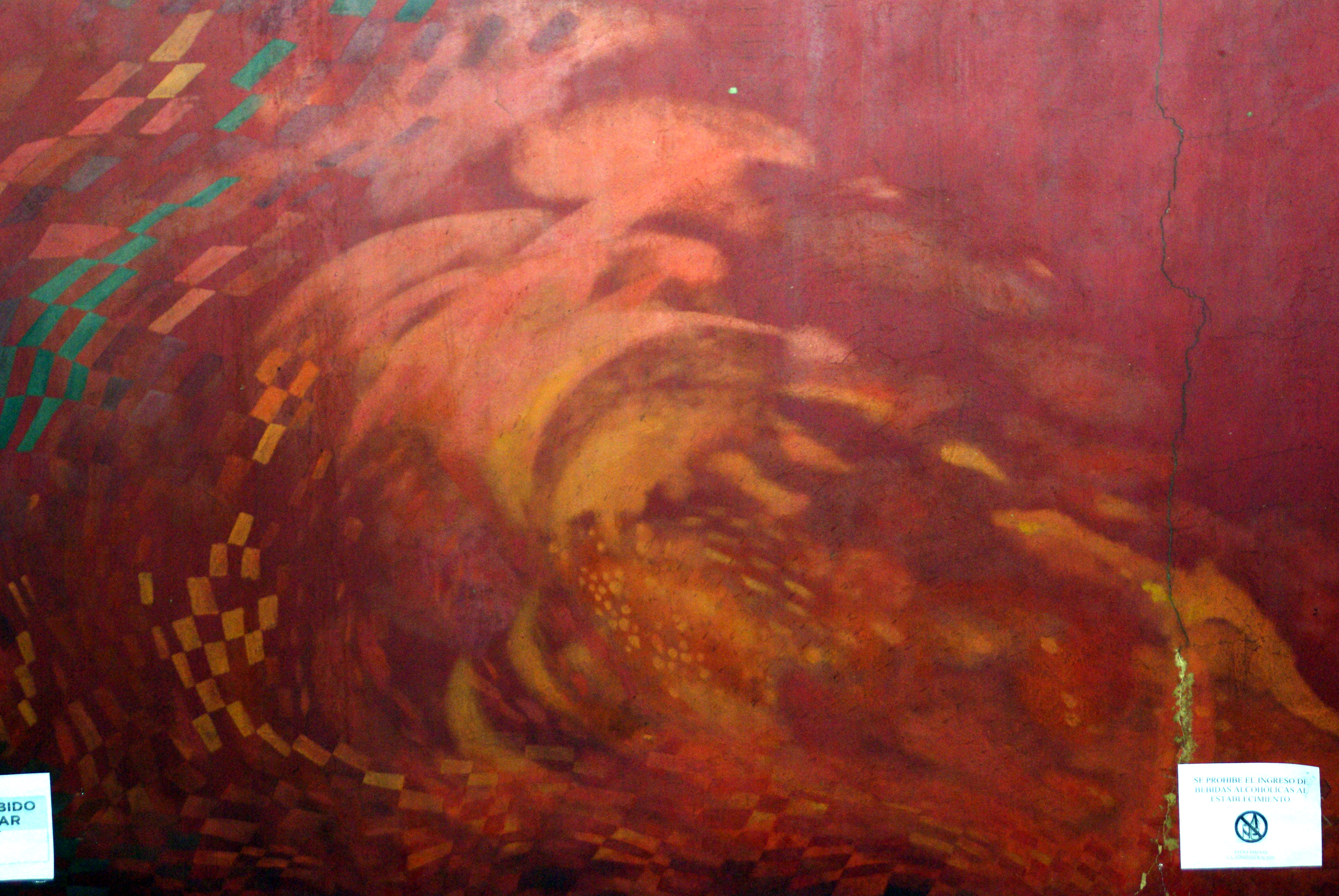
