= Cesante =

Studio album by Duo Quelentaro
- Released: 1972
- Label: EMI Odeón Chile

Duo Quelentaro chronology
Judas (1971)	Cesante (1972)

Cesante is an album from the Chilean musical group Duo Quelentaro. It was released in 1972 on the EMI Odeón Chile label (catalog no. LDC 36789). It was the first album after Quelentaro's transition from a multiperson musical group originally known as Conjunto Quelentaro to a two-person duo known as Duo Quelentaro.

== Track listing ==
Side A

1. "Cesante" (Gastón and Eduardo Guzmán)
2. "De la Infancia" (Gastón and Eduardo Guzmán)

Side B

1. "Jazminero Me Voy" (Gastón and Eduardo Guzmán)
2. "Rosendo Villegas Velarde" (Gastón Suárez)
3. "Del Cerezo" (Gastón and Eduardo Guzmán)
4. "Del Hachero" (Gastón and Eduardo Guzmán)
5. "Del Huerto" (Gastón and Eduardo Guzmán)
6. "Pequeña Muerte" (Gastón and Eduardo Guzmán)
7. "Remembranza" (Gastón and Eduardo Guzmán)
