= Quelentaro =

- Guzmán brothers

Background information
- Occupation: Musical group
- Years active: 1960–2019

Quelentaro, previously Conjunto Quelentaro, was a Chilean folk music group founded in 1960 by brothers Eduardo and Gastón Guzmán. Original members also included José Leppe, Valericio Leppe, Eladio López and Arinaldo Álvarez.

== Discography ==
- Carpa de La Reina (1966, EMI Odeón)
- Coplas al viento (1967, EMI Odeón)
- Huella campesina (1968, EMI Odeón)
- Leña gruesa (1969, EMI Odeón)
- Coplas libertarias a la historia de Chile, Vol.1 (1969, EMI Odeón)
- Judas (1970, EMI Odeón)
- Cesante (1972, EMI Odeón)
- Coplas libertarias a la historia de Chile, Vol. 2 (1972, EMI Odeón)
- Quiebracanto, tiempo de amor (1975)
- Tiempo de amor (1976, EMI Odeón)
- Qué de caminos (1977, EMI Odeón)
- Buscando siembra (1979, EMI Odeón)
- Lonconao (1982)
- Reverdeciendo (1983)
- Aquiebracanto (1985)
- En Vivo (released 1988, recorded in 1985, live at the Teatro Gran Palace)
- Después de la tormenta (1989)
- 8 de marzo (1996)
- 8 de marzo, volumen 2 (2002)
- Por siempre (released 2005, recorded live in 2003)
- Coplas libertarias a la historia de Chile, Vol. 1 y 2 (new versions) (2007)
- Coplas libertarias a la historia de Chile, Vol. 3 y 4 (2011)
- Copla del hijo (2013)

== See also ==
- Quelentaro on Spanish Wikipedia
