= El folklore de Chile según Violeta Parra =

El Folklore de Chile

Studio album by Violeta Parra
- Released: June–July 1962
- Recorded: April–May 1962
- Genre: Chilean folklore
- Length: 38:24
- Label: Odeón

Violeta Parra chronology
Toda Violeta Parra (1961)	El Folklore de Chile (1962)	Recordando a Chile (1965)

El folklore de Chile según Violeta Parra, also known as Violeta Parra en Argentina, is an album by Violeta Parra released on the Odeón label in June or July 1962. It was recorded at the Odeón studios in Buenos Aires between April 23 and May 4, 1962. Parra lived in Argentina from the spring of 1961 until the fall of 1962. The album contains 14 songs, including traditional Chilean folk songs and original compositions by Parra.

The album cover features a self-portrait painted by Parra. The album was reissued in 1971 under the title "Remembering Violeta Parra".

== Track listing ==
1. "Qué pena siente el alma" (traditional Chilean)
2. "La pericona dice" o [La pericona] (Violeta Parra - traditional Chilean)
3. "Salga el sol, salga la luna" (traditional Chilean)
4. "La mazamorrita de cuatro pies" (traditional Chilean)
5. "A cantarle a los porte" (Violeta Parra)
6. "Levántate, Huenchullán" o [Arauco tiene una pena] (Violeta Parra)
7. "Cantaron los pajaritos" (traditional Chilean)
8. "Arriba quemando el sol" o [Y arriba quemando el sol] (Violeta Parra)
9. "Parabienes al revés" (Violeta Parra)
10. "Cristo cuando vino a nuestro" o [Los santos borrachos] (traditional Chilean)
11. "Vengo toda avergonzada" o [Señores y señoritas] (traditional Chilean)
12. "Según el favor del viento" (Violeta Parra)
13. "Una flor voy a nombrar" o [El romero no lo quiero] (traditional Chilean)
14. "A la una nací yo" o [A la una] (traditional Chilean)
