= Carpa de La Reina =

Studio album by Violeta Parra
- Released: 1966
- Recorded: March 1966
- Genre: Chilean folklore
- Length: 30:23
- Label: EMI Odeón

Violeta Parra chronology
Recordando a Chile (1965)	Carpa de La Reina (1966)	Las últimas composiciones (1966)

Carpa de La Reina ("tent of La Reina") is a collective album released on the EMI Odeón label (LDC-36581) in the middle of 1966. The collective is led by Violeta Parra with other artists invited to her popular art center in the La Reina commune in northwest Santiago. The other artists featured on the album are her brothers Lautaro and Roberto Parra, Grupo Chagual, Héctor Pavez, Conjunto Quelentaro, and Lautaro Parra.

The album includes several songs by Parra that were previously unreleased, including "La pericona se ha muerto", "Se juntan dos palomitas", "Los pueblos americanos", and "Palmero sube a la palma". It also includes the first known recording of Parra's "Corazón maldito", performed by Grupo Chagual.

== Track listing ==
Side A

1. "La pericona se ha muerto", written and performed by Violeta Parra
2. "Atención, mozos solteros", traditional performed by Conjunto Quelentaro
3. "Corazón maldito, written by Violeta Parra, performed by Grupo Chagual
4. "El sueño", traditional, performed by Lautaro Parra
5. "De puro cuaco", written and performed by Roberto Parra
6. "Debajo de la palma", traditional, performed by Grupo Chagual

Side B

1. "El nombre de mis queridas", traditional, performed by Héctor Pavez
2. "Se juntan dos palomitas, written and performed by Violeta Parra
3. "Atención calcetineras, written and performed by Roberto Parra
4. "El joven para casarse, traditional, performed by Conjunto Quelentaro
5. "El cargamento", traditional, performed by Lautaro Parra
6. "Los pueblos americanos", written and performed by Violeta Parra
7. "Palmero sube a la palma", written and performed by Violeta Parra
