= Enrique Zañartu =

Chilean artist (1921–2000)

- Born: 6 September 1921; Paris, France
- Died: 13 June 2000 (aged 78); Paris, France
- Known for: Artist, Educator
- Spouse: Sheila Hicks (m. 1965)
- Awards: Guggenheim International Award

Enrique Zañartu (1921–2000) was a Chilean printmaker and educator.

== Biography ==
Zañartu was born on 6 September 1921 in Paris, France, moving to Chile in 1938. He moved to New York City in 1944 where he was associated with the Atelier 17 print studio. There he studied under Stanley William Hayter and also taught classes as well as serving as associate director of the studio. When the studio moved to Paris, Zañartu followed, directing the Paris Atelier 17 from 1950 to 1957.

In 1958 he was the recipient of the Guggenheim International Award. In 1965 he married fellow artist Sheila Hicks with whom he had two children. In 1994 a retrospective of his work was held at the Galería Tomás Andreu in Santiago, Chile. He died in Paris on 13 June 2000.

Zañartu's work is in the collection of Museum of Modern Art, the Albright–Knox Art Gallery, the British Museum, the Dallas Museum of Art, the Kemper Art Museum, as well as the Art Institute of Chicago, Centre Georges Pompidou, Harvard Art Museums, the New York Public Library, the Weatherspoon Art Museum, and Yale University Museum.
