= Toda Violeta Parra: El folklore de Chile Vol. VIII =

Studio album by Violeta Parra
- Released: 1961
- Genre: Chilean folklore
- Length: 44:38
- Label: Odeón

Violeta Parra chronology
| Tonadas (1961) | Toda Violeta Parra: El folklore de Chile Vol. VIII (1961) | El folklore de Chile según Violeta Parra (1962) |

Toda Violeta Parra: El folklore de Chile Vol. VIII is an album by Violeta Parra released on the Odeón label in late 1961. It was the fifth full-length album by Parra and part of Odeón's "El folclore de Chile" series to which Parra contributed five albums. The album contains 14 songs collecting Parra's work as a folk songwriter at different stages of her career. The album was Parra's first to explore issues of social justice and includes three tracks (A5, A7, and B5) in which she set to music poems of Nicanor Parra and Pablo Neruda.

The album cover features photographs by Fernando Krah. The original release included liner notes by Gastón Soublette.

== Track listing ==
All songs written and composed by Violeta Parra, except tracks A5 and A7 (lyrics from poems of Nicanor Parra) and B5 (lyrics from poem of Pablo Neruda).

Side A

1. "Hace falta un guerrillero" (tonada) 3:49
2. "Veintiuno son los dolores" (canción "golpeadita") 2:16
3. "Por la mañanita" (tonada) 2:53
4. "El día de tu cumpleaños" (chapecao) 1:51
5. "El chuico y la damajuana" (refalosa) (Nicanor Parra, Violeta Parra) 2:16
6. "Yo canto la diferencia" (canción "chicoteada") 2:16
7. "El hijo arrepentido" (tonada) (Nicanor Parra, Violeta Parra) 4:10

Side B

1. "Amigos tengo por ciento" (décimas por los elementos) 3:12
2. "Por pasármelo Toman..." (cueca "recortada") 1:37
3. "Qué te trae por aquí" (canción tonada a lo guitarrón) 4:12
4. "Casamiento de negros" (parabienes) 1:44
5. "El pueblo" (Pablo Neruda, Violeta Parra) 3:03
6. "La jardinera" (tonada) 3:03
7. "Puerto Montt está temblando" (décimas en contrapunto por el terremoto) 5:50
