= Leña gruesa =

Studio album by Quelentaro
- Released: 1969
- Label: EMI Odeón Chile

Leña gruesa is the third album from the Chilean musical group Quelentaro, formerly known as Conjunto Quelentaro. It was released in 1969 on the EMI Odeón Chile label (catalog no. LDC 35170). The album was part of a transition stage for the group with Gastón Guzmán and Valericio Leppe doing the singing. The entirety of Side A is the 16-minute title track, "Leña gruesa", written by brothers, Gastón Guzmán and Eduardo Guzmán. The album was re-released in 1993 on cassette and compact disc.

== Track listing ==
Side A

1. "Leña gruesa" (Gastón Guzmán, Eduardo Guzmán) [15:52]

Side B

1. "Voces del Quelentaro" (Gastón Guzmán, Eduardo Guzmán) [2:17]
2. "Político Castro Mena" (Gastón Guzmán, Eduardo Guzmán) [2:28]
3. "No se quién lo permitió" (Gastón Guzmán, Eduardo Guzmán) [4:12]
4. "Nos quieren echar al mar" (Gastón Guzmán, Eduardo Guzmán) [2:37]
5. "Tos y sangre" (Gastón Guzmán, Eduardo Guzmán) [3:21]
6. "Los manzanos florecieron" (Gastón Guzmán, Eduardo Guzmán) [3:44]
