= Chants et Danses du Chili I =

Studio album by Violeta Parra
- Released: September 1956
- Recorded: March 26, 1956
- Genre: Chilean folklore
- Length: 14:55
- Label: Le Chant du Monde

Violeta Parra chronology
Chants et Danses du Chili I (1956)	Chants et Danses du Chili II (1956)

Chants et Danses du Chili I is an extended play record by Violeta Parra released on the Le Chant du Monde label in September 1956. It was the Parra's first extended play record. The release contains eight songs recorded in Paris on March 26, 1956. Parra toured Europe in 1955 after winning the Caupolicán prize in 1954.

The album cover was designed by Moyano. A subsequent reissue of Parra's French recordings, released in 1975 as "Cantos de Chile", includes Parra's spoken introduction of the songs.

== Track listing ==
1. "Aquí se acaba esta cueca" (traditional Chilean song)
2. "Qué pena siente el alma" (traditional Chilean song)
3. "La jardinera" (Violeta Parra)
4. "Casamiento de negros" (traditional Chilean song - Violeta Parra)
5. "Cantos a lo divino" o [Tres cantos a lo divino] (traditional Chilean song)
6. "Miren cómo corre el agua" (traditional Chilean song)
7. "La refalosa" o [Arriba de aquel árbol] (traditional Chilean song)
8. "Paimiti" o [Paemiti] (traditional Tahitian song)
