= TVN =

TVN may refer to:

- TVN (Australian TV channel), a former Australian horse racing channel
- Televisión Nacional de Chile, a public broadcaster
  - TVN3, a Chilean television channel
- TVN (Indonesia), a defunct Indonesian television channel; predecessor of Rajawali Televisi
- TVN (Norway), or TVNorge, a commercial television channel
- TVN (Panamanian TV network), a television network
- TVN (Polish TV channel), a commercial broadcaster
- tvN, a South Korean commercial general entertainment channel
- tvN Asia, a Korean entertainment channel
- TVN Entertainment Corporation, a former US satellite television company
- Television News Inc., an American news service of the 1970s
- Nara Television, a television station in Nara Prefecture, Japan
