= NTV (Chilean TV channel) =

- Country: Chile
- Broadcast area: Chile
- Network: Televisión Nacional de Chile
- Headquarters: Santiago, Chile

Programming
- Language: Spanish
- Picture format: 1080i HDTV (downscaled to 480i for the SD feed)

Ownership
- Owner: Televisión Nacional de Chile
- Sister channels: TVN; Canal 24 Horas; TVN3

History
- Launched: August 8, 2021; 5 years ago
- Replaced: TV Educa Chile

Links
- Website: http://www.tvn.cl/ntv

NTV is a Chilean public television channel focusing on educational and cultural programming for children and teenagers. It is owned by the Chilean State through Televisión Nacional de Chile and started broadcasting on 8 August 2021.

NTV broadcasts from TVN's compound in Providencia, and is financed under the same scheme as TVN with a directorate named by the president and the Senate every four years. Unlike the main TVN channel, its financing differs, coming through a state provision enshrined in Law nº 21,085, granted by the State Budgets Directorate; as consequence, NTV has no paid commercial spots or sponsorship agreements, unlike TVN's other services, which carry advertising because of a law.

== History ==
=== Previous projects ===
NTV's history can be traced back to three experiments TVN had over history: el the first was a service on channel 9 in Santiago with alternate programming, operational from 1986 to 1990, when it was privatized; the second, the kids channel TVN Kids, streamed on its website between 2017 and 2018; and, finally, the creation of TV Educa Chile, created as a result of the pandemic. This last one, owing to the success of its content, is the direct predecessor of NTV.

=== Background ===
On 27 October 2008, during Michelle Bachelet's first government, a project of a law to modify TVN's law nº19,132 was presented, since there were no modiifcations since 1992 whe its first charter was approved; among the changes was the creation of a charter for TVN to promote and disseminate culture, education, national identity and local or regional identities, multiculturalism, respect and care for the environment, tolerance and diversity.

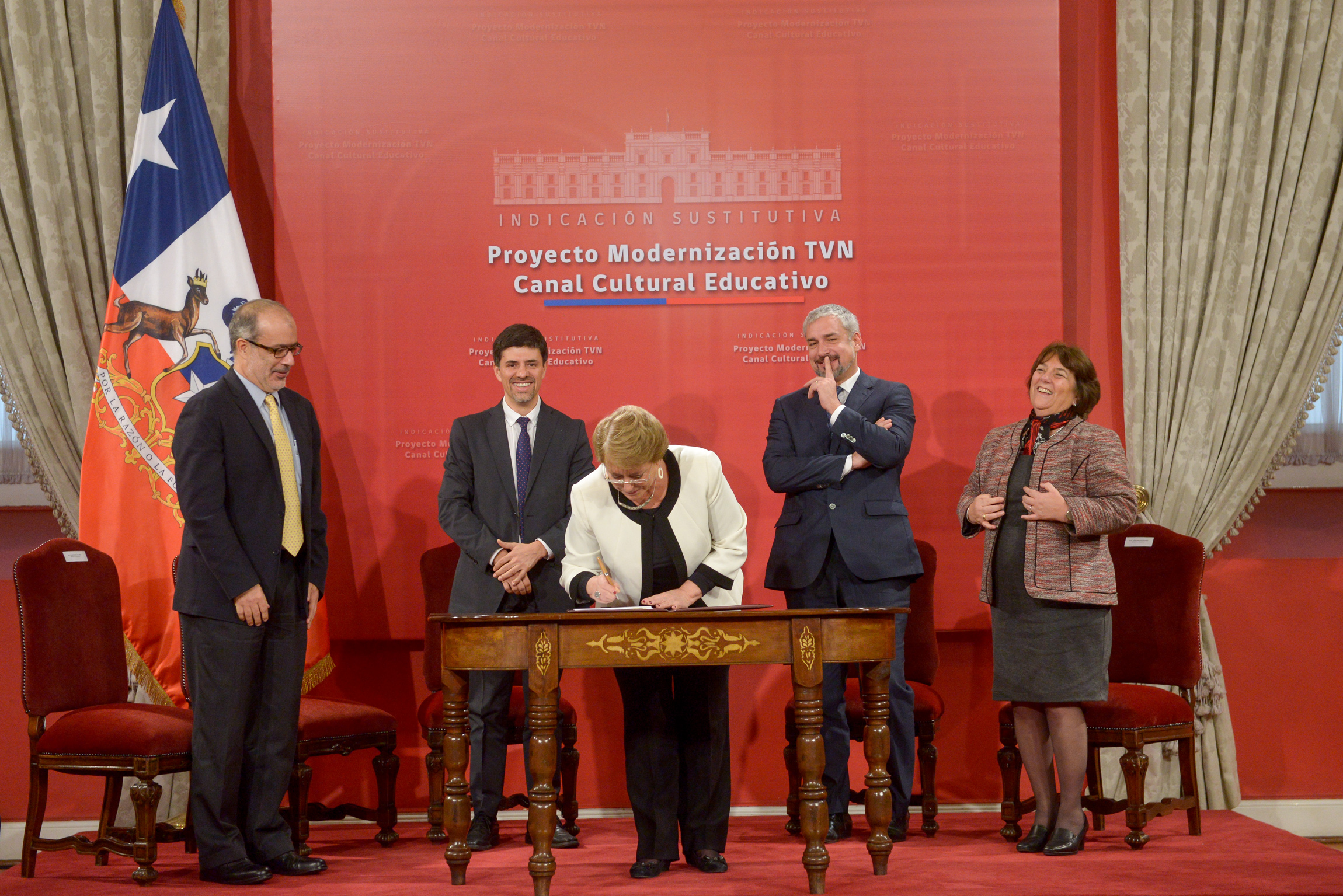
President Michelle Bachelet next to TVN authorities signing the subsitutive indication of the law to create the Educational Cultural Channel in May 2016.

However, the presidential initiative did not enshrine a channel in its own right; after a May 2015 announcement from Bachelet in the state budgets, on 19 May 2016, the indications of Law nº 21,085, which established the creation of a cultural channel with an initial budget of US$25 million, were announced.

After a lengthy debate, influenced by TVN's financial crisis and several veto attempts and threats to reject the presented text, the law was approved in March 2018 during Sebastián Piñera's new government, defining it thusly:

"Televisión Nacional de Chile, as long as it has its license, must broadcast, through a special television network of free-to-air reception and separate from the main one, educational and cultural content, either in national and regional and local dimensions, technological, scientific and cultural content. This free-to-air channel should be dedicated entirely to the broadcast of the referred content, especially those produced in Chile, and must fall under the same coverage conditions as the main channel. The service which this article refers to must have a separate budget from the rest of the company's operations, in conformity with the terms contained in the aforementioned text, articles two to four of the eleventh article of Law nº 18,196, of complementary norms of financial, personal and budgetary administration."

Finally, to finance its launch, an exclusive capital injection of up to US$18 million was granted, coupled with an injection for the main channel for US$47 million.

Despite the support by the law to create the channel, the staff working did not use them or made advancements to launch it. Given the budget crisis TVN had since the second half of the 2010s, one of the main problems were related to uncertainty over posterior financing of the channel once it launched, since by law, and unlike the main TVN channel, it can not include advertising.

=== TV Educa Chile ===
In 2020, when the pandemic suspended in-person classes, the Ministry of Education, the Naitonal Television Council and the networks grouped in ANATEL and ARCATEL launched TV Educa Chile to provide educational entertainment company to school-age kids and their families. The channel would only shut down once the pandemic ended.

In a May 2020 CNTV survey, 86% of respondents expected that the channel would continue after the pandemic. Due to its success and high ratings, on 24 June, it was announced that the channel would extend its broadcasts until 14 September, three months more than initially planned, coinciding with the preliminary end of the state of emergency. Thus, on 12 July, it was revealed that TVN's directorate evaluated taking over TV Educa Chile's content direction to transition it into the new cultural channel.

=== Launch ===
On 17 March 2021, president Sebastián Piñera confirmed in an announcement that TV Educa Chile would become TVN's cultural channels, keeping the educational and family content to keep supporting distance learning for under-17s. It was also informed that an agreement with ANATEL was signed for content from other channels to air in its schedule.

TVN unveiled the name NTV, as well as its branding, on channel 7.2 of the digital terrestrial platform, on 29 July 2021, Children's Day in Chile. As previously announced, some of TV Educa Chile's content continued, as well as adding more titles, such as Dinoexploradores, from launch day.

== Programming ==
NTV signs on at 6am and signs off daily after midnight. Its programming is divided into age-gentric blocks dedicated to children and families.

- Primera infancia (first childhood): ages 2 to 6; 6am to 2:30pm.
- Segunda infancia (second childhood): ages 7 to 12; 2:30pm to 10pm.
- Adulto familiar (family/adult): family-friendly block; 10pm to sign-off.

As of August 2022, one year after launching, the channel premiered 184 programs (742 hours worth of programming) in its three blocks: among them, 89% (164 programs) were national and 11% (20 programs) were international. The contents were divided thusly:

- 34% were produced specifically for NTV (internal and external production, as well as coproductions).
- 21% were canned national programs (paid for the license to broadcast).
- 17% came from the CNTV Infantil library.
- 16% corresponds to donations (produced especially, but with no cost for the channel).
- 12% come from TVN's library, repeated on NTV.

Of the 742 hours of this first year alone, 522 hours (70%) corresponded to family programming and 220 hours (30%) to children's programming.
