= Televisión Nacional de Chile Red Austral =

- Country: Chile

Programming
- Language: Spanish
- Picture format: 1080i HDTV (downscaled to 480i for the SDTV feed)

Ownership
- Owner: Televisión Nacional de Chile
- Sister channels: Canal 13 TVN Señal 2 (1989–1990)

History
- Launched: 1 February 1969

Links
- Website: www.tvn.cl

Availability

Terrestrial
- Digital VHF: 6.1 (Punta Arenas)

Televisión Nacional de Chile Red Austral, or simply TVN Red Austral, is Televisión Nacional de Chile's regional station for the Magallanes Region in the southern tip of Chile. It started broadcasting in February 1969 (before even TVN started broadcasting from Santiago), and has its studios at Camino Río de los Ciervos Kilómetro 3½ Sur, in the city of Punta Arenas.

It offers local programming and advertising in TVN's local opt-outs, especially its newscasts.

== History ==
Before TVN started broadcasting in the area, several owners of television sets in Punta Arenas noticed that, since mid 1968, they could receive signals from Argentine signals (through DXing), mainly channel 2 from La Plata.

The installation of TVN's local unit marked the beginning of TVN's regionalization process. Channel 6 of Punta Arenas had its inauguration on February 1, 1969, and featured the presence of president Eduardo Frei Montalva and Magallanes regional intendant Mateo Martinic. The studios were located at Croacia 670 —at the time the street was named Yugoslavia—, and its transmitting antenna was atop Mount Fenton (also named Mirador). Its first director was Manuel Zuleta.

A few months after founding, TVN Red Austral expanded its reach, launching in Cerro Sombrero (channel 8) on September 16, 1970, Puerto Natales (channel 10) on December 7, 1972, Cullen 1 (channel 10), Cullen 2 (channel 12) and Posesión (channel 11) all at once on December 15, 1975, and Puerto Williams (channel 8) on April 15, 1979.

On September 18, 1974, the first live outside broadcast was held with the special program 18 en el Seis, for Chile's national day, presented by Caupolicán Sanhueza. The station's current building was built between 1974 and 1976, with an area of 1120 m^{2} in a plot of 15,000 m^{2}, designed by architects Hernán Rodríguez, Juan Galleguillos, Gastón Saint-Jean and Nicolás García; the new studios were given on February 27, 1976 and officially inaugurated on February 1, 1977.

In mid-1975, a major increase in local production began; on August 17 of that year, TVN Red Austral aired the final day of 7° Festival Folklórico de la Patagonia, which constituted an event on local television and implied the arrival of staff and equipment from Santiago, as well as the recording of said festival to be seen nationwide later on.

On May 26, 1978, the Punta Arenas Earth Station became operational, which enabled a satellite link between TVN Red Austral with TVN's national network, initially with a live broadcast of fifteen minutes of news a day from Santiago, while the remaining programming that arrived from there aired on tape delay. From February 1983, Red Austral started receiving most live programming from Santiago; that same year it opened new relays at Morro Chico (channel 7), Dorotea (channel 10) and Cameron (channel 13). In 1985 and 1986, satellite earth stations at Puerto Williams and the Teniente Marsh Base in Chilean Antarctica, opened, whereas in 1989, the Punta Arenas satellite station started working.

Between May 9, 1989, and April 22, 1990, Red Austral operated a second channel, Canal 13, built to resemble Canal 9, TVN's second channel in Santiago, offering cultural and sports programming, as well as local programs.

For several years, this would be the only local TVN station to produce its own programming, such as magazine-style and chidlren's programs which, for the first time, were only known to the rest of Chile thanks to TVN 40 Años: Tu historia es mi historia, produced for its fortieth anniversary in 2009; among them its coverage of the "Puntarenazo" in 1984. It wasn't until 1990 when Televisión Nacional de Chile decided to create more regional centers with the aim of enriching the news coverage in each region of the country.

Since its beginnings, TVN Red Austral's mission was delivering news to local viewers. This way, the only program that has been airing uninterruptedly since the beginning was 24 Horas Red Austral, successor of Telediario (1969–1990) and had, among its presenters, Patricio Mladinic Centurione, Alfredo Roni Caridi, Caupolicán Sanhueza, Artemio Gutiérrez, Juan Martinic, Carlos Bianchi Chelech, among others. Its staff also had figures such as Abel Esquivel Querci, José Calisto, Gazi Jalil Trebotic, Patricia Stambuk, John Skirving, Patricio Caldichoury Ríos and Juan Ursic Leal; this last one worked as a camera man and a set designer begore becoming the channel's director. Ursic died in Croatia in 2018.

On February 6, 2026, TVN Red Austral started unloading its former headquarters in Punta Arenas after they were sold to construction company Salfa for 90,000 monetary units; the station's headquarters were relocated to the third floor of the 21 de Mayo with Bellavista building, which is rented to the University of Magallanes, while the audiovisual archives were relocated to Santiago for digitalization —through an alliance with Cineteca de la Universidad de Chile— and preservation.
