= Canal 13 TVN Señal 2 =

- Country: Chile

Programming
- Language: Spanish

Ownership
- Owner: Televisión Nacional de Chile
- Sister channels: TVN Red Austral

History
- Launched: 9 May 1989; 37 years ago
- Closed: 22 April 1990; 36 years ago

Availability

Terrestrial
- Punta Arenas: Channel 13

Canal 13 was Televisión Nacional de Chile Red Austral's second station in Punta Arenas, which operated between 1989 and 1990, based on Canal 9 TVN Señal 2 (from Santiago) with local programming. The station existed for less than a year.

== History ==
Designed to be similar to Canal 9 of Santiago, Canal 13 de Punta Arenas was publicly announced in March 1989 by Marcos Salazar, director of TVN's Red Austral, planning to air acquired cultural and sports programming. Its studios were located on what used to be Canal 6's mobile unit, which was refurbished and equipped with new implements, and the investment to establish this second channel cost US$150,000.

Its broadcasts began on May 9, 1989, at 7pm, with the live broadcast of the inaugural ceremony —headed by Marcos Salazar and the regional intendant of Magallanes, Patricio Gualda— and on the same day it aired the programs Satélite del deporte, Noticias (TVN's transitional newscast and predecessor of 24 Horas), Telediario regional and the start of the local program Esta semana, presented by Patricia Stambuk. The station broadcast Tuesdays to Sundays.

Canal 13's signal, by having less power than TVN (on channel 6), showed reception difficulties in some areas of Punta Arenas, for which it was recommended to install multichannel type antennas to ease its reception. Among its programs were Lunes 21:30, primetime slot initially produced fortnightly for the main TVN Red Austral station on channel 6, which moved to the second channel to air on Tuesdays.

On August 29, 1989, the station did not air that week's edition of Esta semana, due to technical mishaps which caused it to be rerecorded, however it a possible act of censorship regarding expressions used by the panelists was reported, who were talking about the region's health system. On September 1, the program was rerecorded and subsequently broadcast, however the situation caused the firing of Patricia Stambuk, its presenter, from TVN's Red Austral.

After the process of the sale of TVN's second network —which in Punta Arenas was assigned channel 12— to Sociedad Ernesto Pinto Claude y Compañía, Canal 13 shut down on April 22, 1990 —in the midst of TVN's restructuring process which included the unloading of Red Austral's staff— and the subsequent Megavisión station in Punta Arenas started broadcasting on channel 12 on June 28, 1991, initially airing tape-delayed programming, and started relaying the national satellite feed from Santiago in 1993.
