= TV Educa Chile =

- Country: Chile
- Broadcast area: Chile
- Network: Televisión Nacional de Chile
- Headquarters: Santiago, Chile

Programming
- Language: Spanish
- Picture format: 1080i HDTV (downscaled to 480i/576i for the SD feed)

Ownership
- Owner: Televisión Nacional de Chile

History
- Launched: April 27, 2020; 6 years ago
- Closed: August 8, 2021; 5 years ago
- Replaced by: NTV

TV Educa Chile was a Chilean over-the-air children's television channel, promoted in a historic agreement between the channels part of ANATEL, with the support of the Ministry of Education and the National Television Council. It started broadcasting on 14 April 2020, with the goal of complementing distance education for Chilean students during the pandemic.

== History ==
Its launch was announced by the president of the republic, Sebastián Piñera, on 14 April 2020 as a joint effort of the Ministry of Education, the National Television Council and the television networks grouped in ANATEL and Arcatel to provide educational entertainment content to the school-age population and their parents as a result of the pandemic. It is the second educational television project in Chile, after Teleduc, from the Catholic University of Chile.

The service was operated by Televisión Nacional de Chile and included the public network's content, as well as content from private networks Chilevisión, Mega and Canal 13, as well as independent audiovisual productions and distance education content. According to CNTV, it was also incorporated to the main subscription television companies of the country.

The channel had an editorial committee consisting of a representant of each of the Anatel member channels, which was presided by Ernesto Corona. The channel's secretary executive was Loreto Sanhueza (TVN) and its director of programming was Mariana Hidalgo (TVN executive producer).

CNTV held a survey in May 2020, which concluded that 86% of respondents wanted that the channel would continue after the pandemic ended. Due to its success and high ratings, it was announced on 24 June that the channel would continue broadcasting for an additional three-month period, until 14 September, date in which the National State of Catastrophe in Chile would preliminarily end. Thus, on 12 July, it was revealed that Televisión Nacional de Chile's directory was evaluating becoming in charge of TV Educa Chile's content to turn it into a cultural channel, beyond the pandemic. On 14 August, it was announced that the channel would continue broadcasting until December, and that both Canal 13 and TV+ were interested in taking part in its extension, competing with the interest already shown by TVN.

On 17 March 2021, president Sebastián Piñera alongside ministers of the General-Secretariat of the Government, Jaime Bellolio; of Education, Raúl Figueroa, and of Cultures, Consuelo Valdés, announced that TV Educa Chile would become TVN's cultural channel, with the intent of accomplishing what was established in law nº 21,085 of 2018, whose aim —the launch of a second TVN channel of a cultural character— was frozen at the time. An agreement with Anatel to allow content from the other networks to remain on the channel was also announced.

Televisión Nacional de Chile started administering the channel alone on 1 July; however, La Red kept distributing its frequency in the Santiago metropolitan area. During this period, it was announced that it would be replaced by a new channel with separate financing and a cultural-family schedule, differentiating itself from TV Educa Chile's own scheme, whose programs were donated by other channels, production copmanies and foundations, and were aimed at a child audience. Later, on 29 July 2021, it was announced that TVN would launch, on Children's Day in Chile, a new channel, NTV, replacing TV Educa Chile, which shut down, and this time in its own channel slot.

== Programming ==
TV Educa Chile signed on at 6am and signed off daily after midnight, with the exception of its subchannel on Canal 13's network, where it signed off at 10pm. Its programming was based on the following blocks:

- Despierta (6am-2pm)
- Descubre (10am-3:30pm);
- Crea (12pm-6pm);
- Diviértete (12:20pm-6:20pm);
- Diviértete en Familia (9:30pm-sign-off)

In addition, the Ministry of Education and TVN launched AprendoTV, a distance learning program for first to fourth grade students, with language, math, science and history classes.

Some series such as Pichintún and Abre Palabras, also used sign language, closed captions and audio description.
