= Davor Gjuranovic =

Chilean journalist

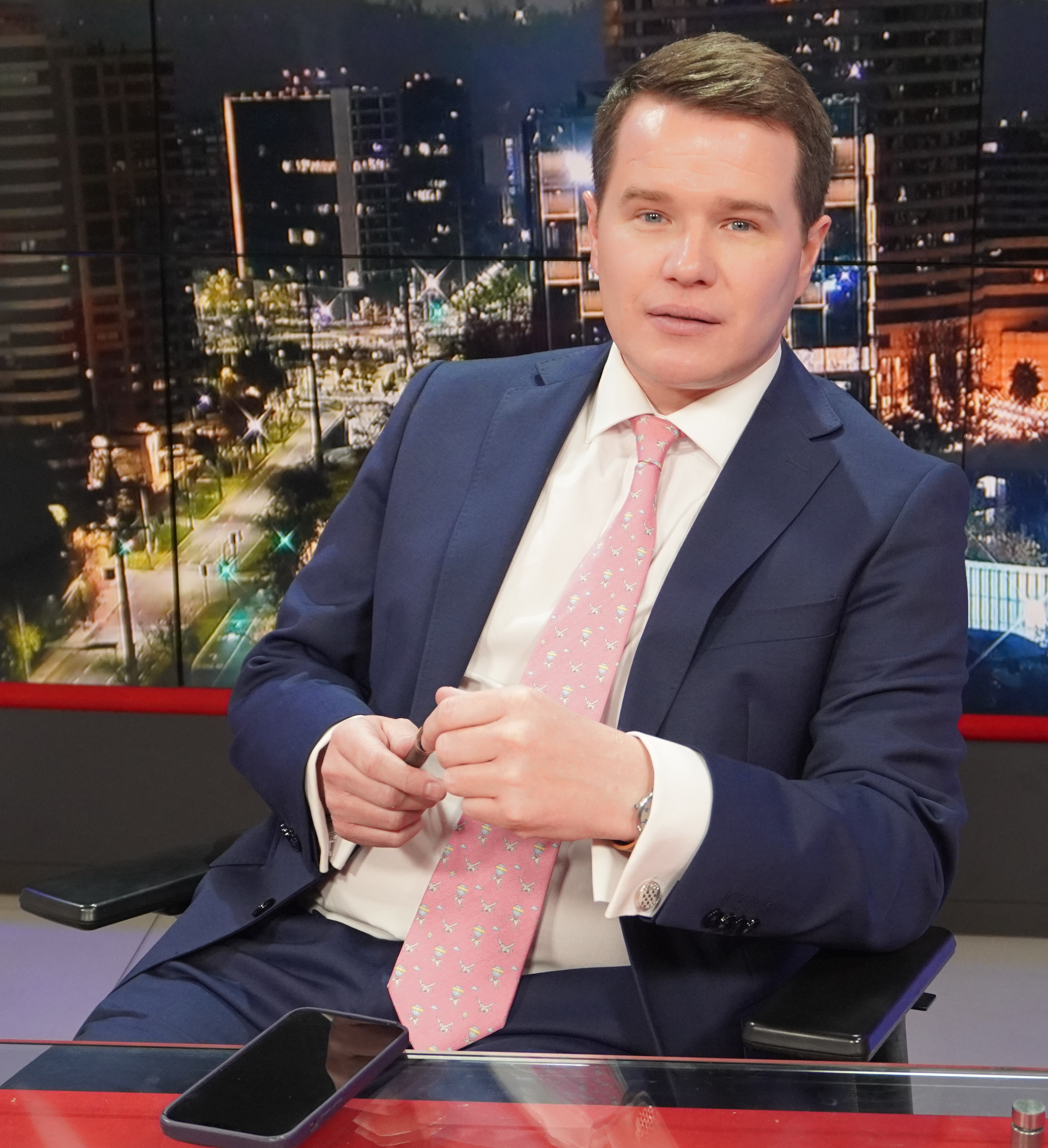
- Born: 16 September 1980 (age 45); Punta Arenas, Chile
- Education: Pontifical Catholic University of Valparaíso (B.A. in Journalism); Adolfo Ibáñez University (M.A. in Public Affaires); Georgetown University (Executive Course: Strategic Communication)
- Occupation: Journalist
- Known for: Work at: Televisión Nacional de Chile (2005–); Great Military Parade of Chile (2011–); 24 Horas

Davor Jorge Gjuranovic Letelier (born 16 September 1980) is a Chilean journalist commonly known for his work at Televisión Nacional de Chile (TVN), as well as his coverage to the Military Parades since early 2010s.

Gjuranovic has been the main anchor of the joint national television broadcast of Chile’s Great Military Parade of Chile, held every September 19 in Santiago’s O'Higgins Park. In this role, his knowledge of military protocol and institutional matters has been widely recognized by audiences and media professionals alike.

Gjuranovic stated that he grew up watching TVN during his childhood in Punta Arenas, and also says he feels a deep sense of identification with the channel. His main reporting has always focused on tragedies: earthquakes, mudslides, volcanic eruptions, forest fires, among others.

He has been in charge of various segments and coverages within TVN's News Department, particularly on the newscast 24 Horas, where he has worked as a reporter, international affairs analyst, and presenter for special broadcasts.

== Early life ==
At the beginning of his career, Gjuranovic worked at UCV Radio, a station affiliated with the Pontifical Catholic University of Valparaíso (PUCV), where he began as a sports journalist. He then made his postgraduate studies at the Adolfo Ibáñez University.

During this time, he covered professional football matches in the Chilean Football Championship, reporting on games involving traditional teams from the Valparaíso Region, such as Everton de Viña del Mar and Santiago Wanderers.

His radio experience later expanded to national stations such as Rock & Pop and Radio Concierto, where he worked in areas related to general news and current affairs. His entry into television came in 2002, when he completed his internship at Canal 13, one of Chile's main broadcast television networks. He stayed a pair of seasons in the channel.

== Televisión Nacional de Chile (TVN) ==
=== Beginnings ===
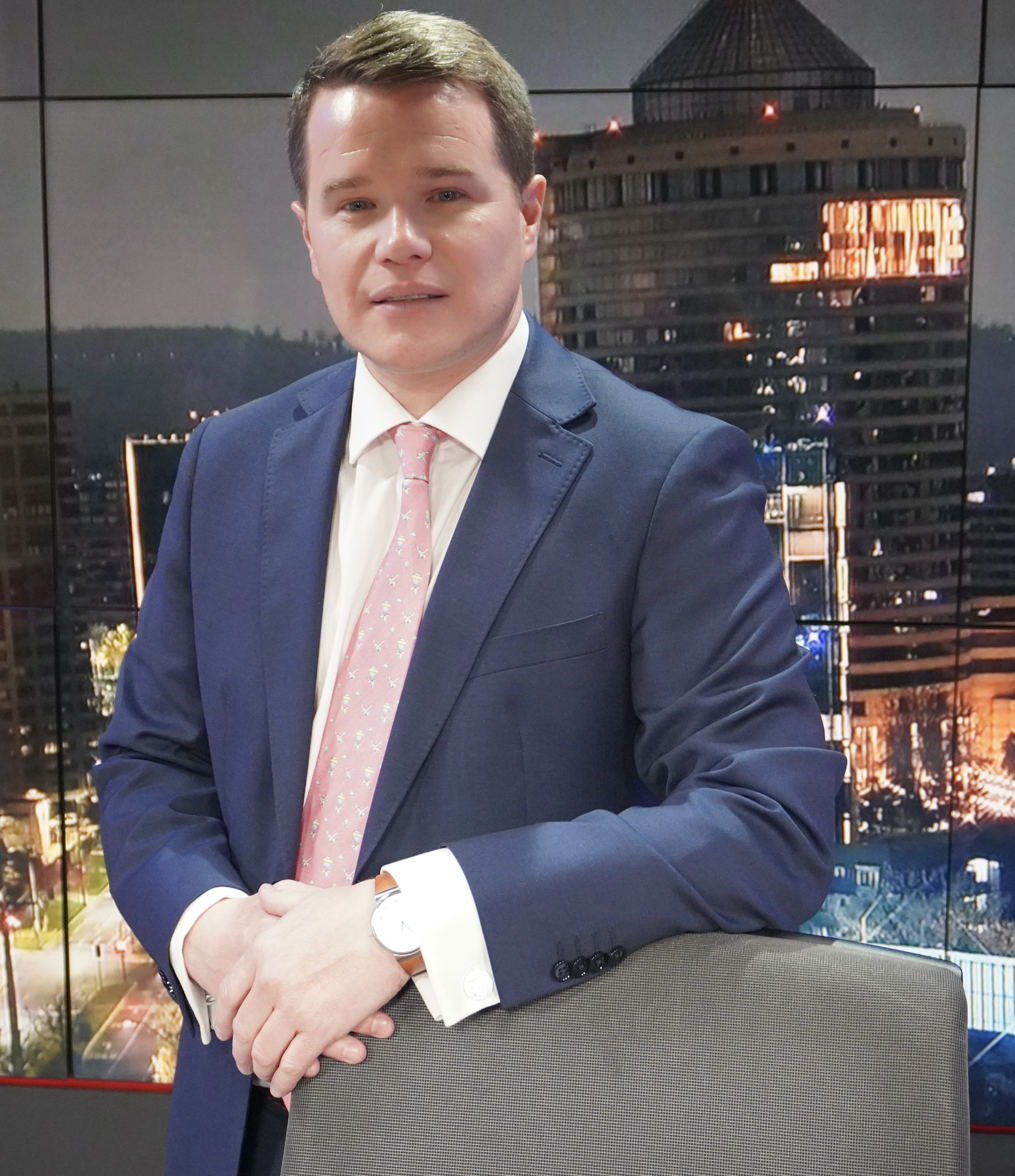
Gjuranovic in the 24 Horas studio.

In March 2005, he formally joined the news department of Televisión Nacional de Chile (TVN). His first major coverage was the tragedy of the military conscripts who died in Antuco, which occurred in May, two months after he joined the channel.

On December 10, 2006, he was the journalist who announced live on TVN the death of dictator Augusto Pinochet Ugarte, marking a significant moment in the country’s recent history.

Starting in 2007, Davor also became involved in the world of transportation by covering the poorly designed transition from the old bus system in the Chilean capital to the implementation of Transantiago. This allowed him to study and learn about different transportation systems around the world in cities such as Singapore, London, Curitiba, Paris, among others.

On May 1, 2008, he was among the journalists who covered the tragedy of the Chaitén volcano eruption. In 2010, Gjuranovic cemented his national notoriety by covering the 8.8-magnitude earthquake on February 27, with its epicenter in Concepción.

=== TVN personality ===
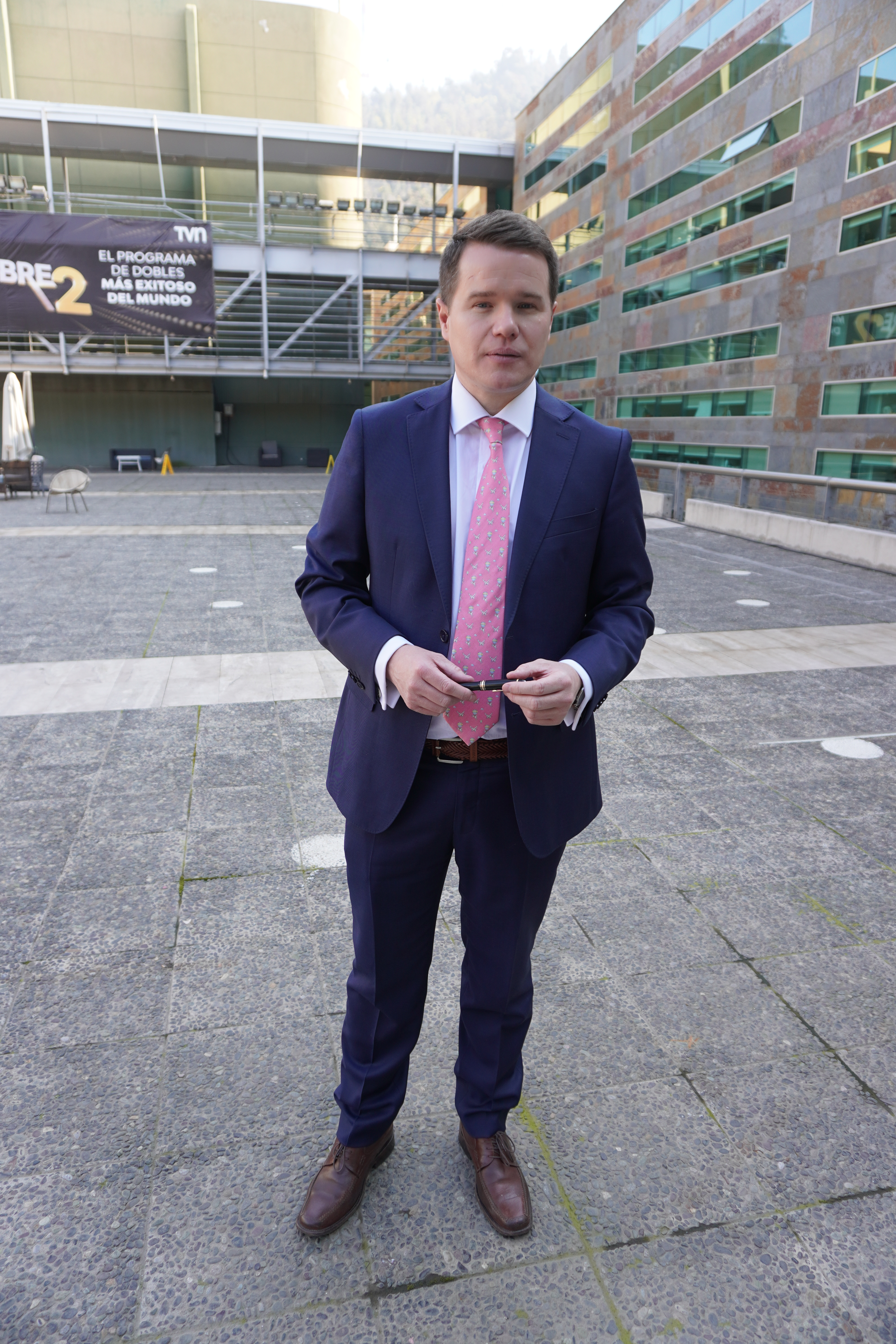
Davor Gjuranovic in the Communications Courtyard of Televisión Nacional de Chile (TVN).

In 2011, Davor covered his first Great Military Parade of Chile as the official presenter of TVN. Similarly, in 2012, he covered his first Naval Glories Parade of May 21 ever held in the Sotomayor Square of Valparaíso. He has continued to broadcast both official events to this day.

Years later, in 2015, he covered the mudslide that occurred in Chañaral, which devastated the entire city under a layer of mud. Then, in September, Gjuranovic reported on the 8.3 Illapel earthquake, which resulted in only 15 deaths.

In 2025, he was diagnosed with skin cancer, from which he made a full recovery after timely medical treatment. Gjuranovic approached this process with discretion and resilience, resuming his television duties once his recovery was complete.

In mid-2025, Gjuranovic expanded his career as an author with the publication of the book La Sombra del Penacho (lit. The Shadow of the Plume), published by Trayecto Communications Publishing. In this book, Gjuranovic offers a historical-journalistic work on the September 19th Military Parades, broadcast on television since 1962, exploring their profound political, historical, and symbolic meaning.

The book was launched on July 10, with Gjuranovic signing copies in the Cultural Centre of Providencia, where he also exposed on the contents.

More than a militaristic account, it is a historical chronicle that intertwines the country’s political history with television footage, press archives, and previously unpublished interviews —such as those conducted with Patricio Bañados and General Carlos Parera— shedding light on key moments of the Chilean collective memory.

== Works ==
=== Books ===
- La Sombra del Penacho (2025). Trayecto Comunicaciones Publishing

== Honors ==
- «Ambassador of Magallanes» (2018).
