= Marie Laguerre =

French activist (born 1996)

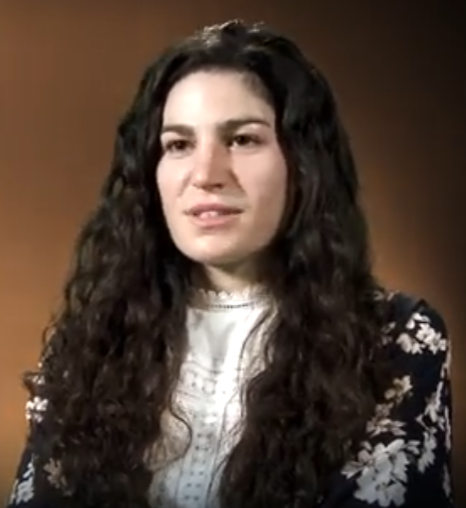
- In a UN Human Rights video in 2018
- Born: 22 February 1996 (age 30); Saint-Cyr-l'École, Île-de-France, France
- Occupation: Feminist activist
- Years active: 2018–present
- Known for: Campaigning against street harassment
- Honours: BBC 100 Women (2018)

Marie Laguerre (born 22 February 1996) is a French feminist activist, known for her campaigning against street harassment after she was assaulted while walking home in 2018.

== Early life and education ==
Laguerre was born on 22 February 1996 in Saint-Cyr-l'École in the western suburbs of Paris to a Lebanese mother and a father of Basque heritage. In 2013, she enrolled in an engineering course in Rennes, Brittany, graduating in 2018. Laguerre subsequently started studying for a bachelor's degree in architecture in Paris.

== Activism ==
=== Assault and trial ===
On 24 July 2018, while Laguerre was returning to her home in the 19th arrondissement of Paris, a man on the street made obscene remarks to her. After Laguerre said to him "ta gueule" (lit. 'shut up'), the man threw an ashtray at her, missing her. Following a verbal altercation between the two, the man punched Laguerre in the face.

After obtaining CCTV of the attack from a nearby bistro, Laguerre uploaded the footage onto Facebook. The footage was subsequently reported on widely, both in French outlets such as Le Parisien and France Info, and also by the international media, including 24 horas, The Guardian and the BBC. By 2020, the footage had been viewed over 20 million times. Laguerre was interviewed by various television programmes, including Touche pas à mon poste!.

Laguerre filed a criminal complaint against her attacker, who was arrested on 27 August 2018. It was revealed that he had already been convicted on nine previous occasions of contempt, theft and violence. He admitted to assaulting Laguerre, and on 4 October 2018 was sentenced to serve one year in prison, with six months suspended; to pay Laguerre €2000 in damages; and to partake in a course on violence against women.

Following the public debate caused by Laguerre's assault, on 3 August 2018, the French government passed the Schiappa law, which formally made street harassment illegal. Laguerre commented publicly on her support of the wider conversation occurring on the issue of street harassment, though criticised the fact that there was no legislation criminalising it prior to her assault.

=== Subsequent events ===
On 1 August 2018, Laguerre launched Nous toutes harcèlement (lit. 'we are all harassed'), a website that collected testimonies from women who had experienced harassment on the street, at work and at home. Laguerre reported being the victim of cyberbullying following her assault, and on 5 December 2018 filed a criminal complaint against Twitter with the Tribunal judiciaire de Paris, handing over her computer to assist with the identification of her harassers.

Following the attack, Laguerre paused her studies, before resuming them in September 2019.

In February 2020, Laguerre co-wrote a book, Rebellez-vous! (lit. 'Rebel!'), about the struggle for women's rights.
