= Televisión Nacional de Chile en Isla de Pascua =

- Country: Chile

Programming
- Language: Spanish
- Picture format: 1080i HDTV (downscaled to 480i for the SDTV feed)

Ownership
- Owner: Televisión Nacional de Chile

History
- Launched: 24 January 1975

Links
- Website: www.tvn.cl

Availability

Terrestrial
- Digital VHF: 7.1 (Hanga Roa)

Televisión Nacional de Chile en Isla de Pascua (channel 7) started broadcasts on January 24, 1975. Initially operating as an autonomous station, it started relaying the live signal of the Santiago station by satellite in 1996. It is one of the three Chilean networks to have an over-the-air presence in the island.

== History ==
The first proposals to install television in Easter Island date back to August 1970, when in the midst of the 1970 Chilean presidential election, Comité Adelanto Pascuense sent a letter to the three presidential candidates (Salvador Allende, Jorge Alessandri and Radomiro Tomic) proposing ideas to develop in Rapa Nui, among them installing a local television station.

Later, on April 23, 1974, the Assessing Commission for Television in Easter Island (Comisión Asesora de la Televisión de Isla de Pascua) was created, composed of eight members: the departmental governor of Easter Island, the Port Captain and Military Chief, the mayor of the municipality, the head of the Mataveri Airport, the head of Empresa Nacional de Telecomunicaciones (Entel Chile), the executive director of Radio Manukena, the manager of Empresa de Comercio Agrícola and the head of Oficina de Tierras y Bienes Nacionales, who were in charge of management in front of the authorities to install a television station in the island.

The local station of Televisión Nacional de Chile in Easter Island was inaugurated on January 24, 1975, during the visit held by the leader of the Government Junta of Chile, Augusto Pinochet, to Hanga Roa, becoming the 54th station of the state broadcaster and initially broadcasting two hours a day on channel 7. The entire schedule was pre-packaged and sent from Santiago on LAN Chile planes to the island; the first programs seen were The Lucy Show, The Pink Panther Show and Kung Fu. With the aim of verifying the contents that would be seen on the Easter Island station, on April 4, 1975, the Ministry of Education outlined a commission in charge of viewing the programs to air, as well as informing the National Television Council on the accomplishment of the corresponding norms.

In the 1970s and 1980s there were constant complaints and questionings on behalf of locals respecting the quality of the programming sent by TVN; this way, channel 7 in Hanga Roa added a local opt out to the broadcast hours, aimed primarily at delivering information supplied by the Municipality and the Provincial Government to residents and tourists. In 1983, given that TVN Channel 7 was the only TV station in the island, viewers noticed that it had also broadcast Canal 13 programming via videotape per a affilation agreement with the Santiago-based broadcaster, to complement TVN programs and its local productions. The initial package in August of that year consisted of Mundo 83, Creaciones and sporting events. UCTV director Hugo Morales traveled to Easter Island who demanded, after a survey, that locals needed more programs from the network, and that, according to Andrés Bustamante, only national productions could be given to the TVN station, as imported programming depended on contracts. As of 1985, its programming ran for six hours a day, as well as airing a weekly recap of the national news program 60 minutos.

Live broadcasts of TVN's mainland signal to Easter Island started in 1996, which were joined by Mata O Te Rapa Nui, first local channel of the island, in September 1999, Red Televisión in August 2004 y Chilevisión in 2011. The transmitting towers are located at the foothills of the Rano Kau volcano.

On July 30, 2021, the National Television Council granted TVN a digital terrestrial television license to the island, beginning the process of renewing its equipment to broadcast in the new system.
