= Francisco Fluxá =

President of the Asociación Central del Fútbol
- In office 1973–1974
- Preceded by: Nicolás Abumohor
- Succeeded by: Eduardo Gordon Cañas

President of Unión Española
- In office 1971–1972

Personal details
- Born: 15 November 1933; Santiago, Chile
- Died: 10 February 2016 (aged 82); Santiago, Chile
- Parent(s): Guillermo Fluxá Mut; Antonia Ginart Llull
- Occupation: Entrepreneur; Football leader
- Known for: Former president of Chilean Football Association

Francisco Fluxá Ginart (15 November 1933 – 10 February 2016) was a Chilean football leader who served as president of Unión Española and the Chilean Football Association, then called Asociación Central del Fútbol (ACF).

His period in the ACF is regarded for the qualification of Chile to the 1974 FIFA World Cup and for the political problems amid the 1973 coup d'état led by general Augusto Pinochet. Similarly, according to the journalist Daniel Matamala, Fluxá was a fierce supporter of president Eduardo Frei Montalva (1964−1970) and his party, the Christian Democracy.
