= Mónica Rincón =

Chilean journalist

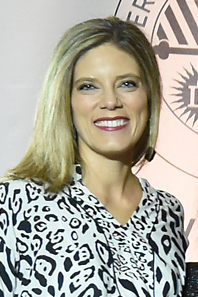

Personal details
- Born: 17 December 1975 (age 50) Concepción, Chile
- Spouse: José Manuel Galdames (2011–present)
- Children: Two
- Parent(s): Ricardo Rincón Iglesias; Luisa González Cofré
- Relatives: Ximena Rincón (sister); Ricardo (brother)
- Education: Pontifical Catholic University of Chile (BA); Andrés Bello National University (MA)
- Occupation: TV presenter
- Profession: Journalist political scientist

Mónica Patricia Rincón González (born 17 December 1975) is a Chilean journalist known for her current work in CNN Chile alongside Daniel Matamala.

Rincón has worked on radio stations Zero, Bío-Bío (2007) and Amadeus (2009). She has headlined major news broadcasts, breaking the news to the world with the deaths of Augusto Pinochet (2006) and Osama bin Laden (2011). On 27 February 2010, she also was the first television journalist to report on the Chile earthquake.

== Early life ==
Rincón is the daughter of the marriage formed by Ricardo Rincón Iglesias and Luisa González Cofré. Her brother Rodrigo also is a journalist, while her siblings Ricardo and Ximena were Christian democratic politicians (this last one is the current president of the Senate).

She studied at the Carmela Romero de Espinosa School of the Dominican mothers of Concepción, from where she obtained a 6.9 score average (equivalent to an A+). Then, Rincón entered the Pontifical Catholic University of Chile to study journalism, where she obtained an Honor Scholarship and graduated as the best student of her generation.

After graduating from PUC, she did a master's degree in Political Science at the Universidad Andrés Bello.

== Career ==
In 1994, she participated in the Miss 17 beauty pageant.

In 1998, she did her internship in the Canal 13 Press Department. In the same year, she was called to work in the Televisión Nacional de Chile (TVN) Press Department, and –from then on– she began reporting and doing dispatches. She has made reports abroad in countries such as France, Nicaragua, Argentina or Mexico.

In June 2001, along with fellow journalist Cecilia Serrano, she temporarily hosted the evening edition of 24 Horas, replacing Isabel Tolosa, who resigned to dedicate herself to being a journalistic editor for the service program, Buenos Días, Eli. This replacement lasted until July of the same year when the journalist María Jesús Sainz assumed the definitive leadership.

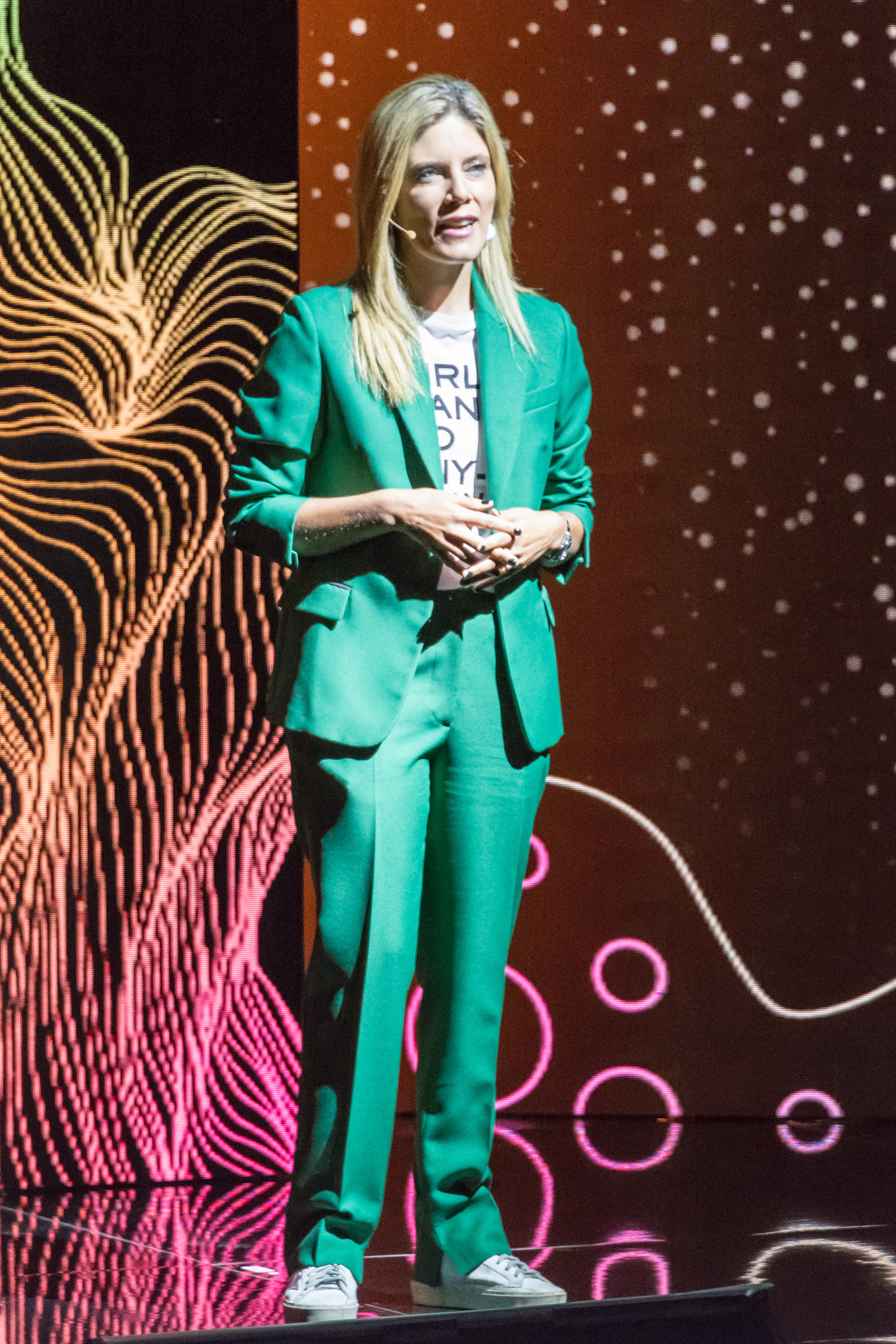
Mónica Rincón in 2020

After six years as a reporter, in March 2004, she took over the leadership of the 24 Horas newscasts in the morning –together with Mauricio Bustamante and Mónica Pérez– until 2007. Similarly, Rincón led 24 Horas informs with Bustamante. The following year, Rincón took over the leadership of the cultural program La Cultura Entretenida («The Entertaining Culture»), a program of which she was also its journalistic editor for three years. For five years, she conducted 24 Horas on weekends.

Since 5 March 2009, she was one of the two anchor faces of the TVN news channel along with the journalist Alejandro Guillier, future politician and presidential candidate in the 2017 elections. There she hosted La Mañana Informativa («The Informative Morning») with Gonzalo Ramírez, where she created the first international analysis program on Chilean TV: En qué mundo vives («In what world do you live»), a space in which she was also its journalistic editor.

== Personal life ==
She is married to José Manuel Galdames, with whom she had twins in 2011: Vicente and Clara Galdames Rincón. Nevertheless, her daughter died on 30 November 2013 due to heart problems related to her Down syndrome.
