= Rolando Molina (lawyer) =

Chilean lawyer and football leader (died 2020)

President of the Chilean Football Association
- In office 1983–1984
- Preceded by: Abel Alonso
- Succeeded by: Antonio Martínez Ruíz

President of Club Universidad de Chile
- In office 1972–1981
- Preceded by: Carlos Pilasi
- Succeeded by: Ambrosio Rodríguez

Personal details
- Born: Santiago, Chile
- Died: 23 October 2020
- Education: University of Chile (BA)
- Profession: Lawyer
- Known for: Former president of ANFP; Former president of Universidad de Chile

Rolando Molina (?−23 October 2020) was a Chilean lawyer and football leader. A man close to Augusto Pinochet, in the 1980s he defined himself as an 'anticommunist that supports the Polish workers and the Afghan people'.

Among the supporters of Universidad de Chile, he is controversially remembered for wasting his investment in a meccano stadium that would be the team's complex. Similarly, there are different authors that point to the same thing, like Daniel Matamala and Carlos González Lucay. On the other hand, Molina is also remembered for having left a deficit of more than $100 million.
