= TVN3 =

- Country: Chile
- Broadcast area: Chile
- Network: Televisión Nacional de Chile
- Headquarters: Santiago, Chile

Programming
- Language: Spanish
- Picture format: 1080i HDTV (downscaled to 480i for the SD feed)

Ownership
- Owner: Televisión Nacional de Chile
- Sister channels: TVN; Canal 24 Horas; NTV

History
- Launched: July 26, 2023; 3 years ago

Links
- Website: https://www.tvn.cl/tvn3

TVN3 is a Chilean subscription television channel airing archived programming from Televisión Nacional de Chile's archives akin to Canal 13's 13Rec.

== History ==
On 8 June 2023, it was reported that TVN had registered the preliminary logo of TVN3 at Instituto Nacional de Propiedad Industrial (Inapi). That same week, it was reported that the channel started test broadcasts.

Fifteen days later, the main TVN channel presented a launch announcement with a collage of historic programs of the network.

The channel includes the network's "cultural, sports, news, entertainment, historical and never-before seen accolades" and is included in free streaming services and also on pay-TV companies. Unlike Rec TV, its direct competitor (owned by Canal 13), the channel did not create new programs, at least at the start.

Broadcasts officially began at 1pm on 26 July 2023. The next day saw the arrival of the channel to Zapping, becoming the first pay-TV company to add it.

On 31 January 2025, VTR announced that it would add the channel from 1 April of that year.

== Programming ==
The channel's programming consists of TVN's historic archives, which includes entertainment shows, reality shows, children's series, telenovelas and cultural programs.
