= Mata O Te Rapa Nui =

- Country: Chile

Programming
- Languages: Spanish and Rapa Nui
- Picture format: 1080i HDTV

Ownership
- Parent: Municipality of Hanga Roa

History
- Founded: 1998
- Launched: September 1999

Availability

Terrestrial
- Digital VHF: 13.1 (Hanga Roa)

Mata O Te Rapa Nui (Rapa Nui language: The Eye of Rapa Nui) is a Chilean television channel broadcasting from Hanga Roa, Easter Island (Valparaíso Region). It is the island's only local television station, administered by its municipality.

Among Mata O Te Rapa Nui's productions are Parau ‘Api (news), Ko Tātou, Honui, Hoko Hia Tātou, Kori Mana Tupuna and Hanga Roa Reka.

== History ==
On January 23, 1998, the Isla de Pascua commune solicited to the National Television Council the license to operate a television channel in the island, which was granted on August 17 the same year under a 25-year license and granted definitively on October 26. On November 3, its characteristics were determined, establishing its video power at 100 watts and that it would broadcast on channel 5, and on December 21, CNTV agreed to find funders to produce local programming for the island.

On June 21, 1999, CNTV agreed to modify the station's frequency, moving from channel 5 to channel 13, after which it started its regular broadcasts in September of the same year, having as one of its founders Leonardo Pakarati, who worked at the channel until 2012. Since 2006, the channel's director was Beatriz Rapu Tepano, a post which was taken in 2022 by Felipe Vergara.

According to the Hoko Hia Tātou survey, held by the Municipality of Easter Island in 2022, 59% of the residents receive their information from the local channel.

In June 2022, the channel signed an agreement with Televisión Nacional de Chile to broadcast news and current affairs items produced in the island, for both its national and international services.

With the approval of the Digital Terrestrial Television law, Mata O Te Rapa Nui was supposed to end its over-the-air television broadcasts because the law made it impossible for municipal television stations to apply for digital licenses. However, on October 11, 2023, Law 21619 was passed enabling the municipality to apply for a digital terrestrial license. The digital transmission equipments were provided by Sercom.

In 2024 Mata O Te Rapa Nui broadcast the Tapati celebrations live for the first time.
