= Bernardo de la Maza =

Chilean lawyer

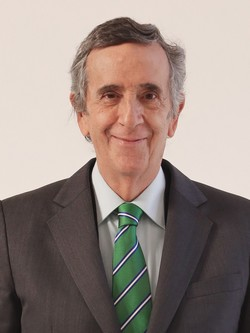

Member of the Constitutional Convention
- In office 4 July 2021 – 4 July 2022
- Constituency: 8th District

Personal details
- Born: 3 January 1946 (age 80) Santiago, Chile
- Party: Close to Evópoli
- Education: Pontifical Catholic University of Chile (BA)
- Profession: Journalist

Bernardo de la Maza (born 3 January 1946) is a Chilean journalist, academic, and independent politician.

He was elected as a member of the Constitutional Convention in 2021, representing the 8th District of the Metropolitan Region of Santiago.

De la Maza participed as communicator of the Informe especial program.

== Early life and family ==
He was born on 3 January 1946 in Santiago, Chile. He is the son of Víctor de la Maza Santander and Margarita Bañados Van Wyngard.

He is married to Ana María Yoacham Soffia.

== Professional career ==
De la Maza earned a degree in journalism from the Pontifical Catholic University of Chile. He pursued postgraduate studies in political science at Boston University and Harvard University, and completed studies in television direction at Radiotelevisione Italiana (RAI). He was a recipient of a Fulbright Scholarship.

In his professional career, he worked as a journalist and anchor of the main evening newscasts on Televisión Nacional de Chile (TVN), Canal 13, and Mega.

In 1990, following Chile’s return to democracy, he became the first Director of News at TVN, where he created the news program 24 Horas. He also hosted the documentary series Nuestro Siglo.

== Political activity ==
In the elections held on 15–16 May 2021, de la Maza ran as a candidato for the Constitutional Convention representing the 8th District of the Metropolitan Region as an independent on a seat supported by the Political Evolution Party, within the Vamos por Chile electoral list.

He obtained 28,327 votes, corresponding to 6.26% of the valid votes cast, and was elected as a member of the Convention.

On 28 October 2021, he announced his resignation from the Vamos por Chile political pact.
