= Eduardo Gordon Cañas =

Chilean officer and football leader (1918–2001)

Eduardo Gordon

Ambassador of Chile to Nicaragua
- In office 1979–1981
- Appointed by: Augusto Pinochet
- Preceded by: Manuel Stagno
- Succeeded by: Alfredo Labbé Villa

President of the ACF
- In office 1975–1979
- Preceded by: Francisco Fluxá
- Succeeded by: Abel Alonso

Personal details
- Born: 1 January 1918 Santiago, Chile
- Died: 8 November 2001 (aged 83) Santiago, Chile
- Relatives: Humberto Gordon (cousin)
- Occupation: Football leader
- Profession: Police officer
- Known for: Former president of Chilean Football Association

Eduardo Gordon Cañas (1918 − 8 November 2001) was a Chilean police officer and football leader who served as president of the Chilean Football Association, then called Asociación Central del Fútbol (ACF).

== Biography ==
During his period as president of the ACF, were created many clubs in bordering zones of Chile for geopolitical reasons, with the goal to generate a sense of belonging, especially in front of Peru and Bolivia. In that way, were established Cobreloa (1978), Deportes Iquique (1979) or Cobresal (1979).

In 1979, after a signature forgery scandal related to the Chile U-20 team, Gordon lost the ANFP elections to Abel Alonso, and, immediately afterward, Augusto Pinochet appointed him ambassador to Nicaragua.
