= Abel Alonso =

Spanish-Chilean entrepreneur (1935–2024)

President of the ANFP
- In office 1979–1982
- Preceded by: Eduardo Gordon Cañas
- Succeeded by: Rolando Molina
- In office 1989–1993
- Preceded by: Guillermo Weinstein
- Succeeded by: Ricardo Abumohor

Personal details
- Born: Abel Alonso Sopelana; 1 January 1935 Bilbao, Spain
- Died: 1 September 2024 (aged 89) Santiago, Chile
- Occupation: Businessman; Shoemaker
- Known for: President of ANFP; President of Unión Española

Abel Alonso Sopelana (1 January 1935 – 1 September 2024) was a Spanish-Chilean businessman, shoemaker and leader of the Chilean football who served as president of the Asociación Nacional de Fútbol Profesional (ANFP) and Unión Española. He was born in Spain, but he was exiled with his family from Francisco Franco’s dictatorship.

Alonso twice reached the presidency of the ANFP. In his first period, the Chilean football team qualified to the 1982 FIFA World Cup in Spain, and during his presidency, Chile held the 1991 Copa América.

== Biography ==
Born in Bilbao, his father – a communist mayor – was a prisoner for seven years under Franco's dictatorship. After his release from prison, his family escaped the country, and in 1951 they settled in Santiago de Chile, dedicating themselves to the manufacture of shoes, arriving to turn its workshop into one of the most important shoe factories in Chile.

Simultaneously, he joined the football club Unión Española, becoming president of it. Under his successful management, the team won the 1973, 1975 and 1977 Primera División de Chile tournaments. Similarly, under Alonso, Unión was runner-up in the 1975 Copa Libertadores.

Alonso died in Santiago on 1 September 2024, at the age of 89.
