= Informe especial =

Chilean TV newsmagazine

Informe especial is an investigative television newsmagazine from Chile. The program began in 1984 and, when in season, airs every Thursday night on TVN.

== Notable Anchormen ==
- Carlos Pinto (1984–88)
- Santiago Pavlovic (2001-)

== See also ==
- Bernardo de la Maza
