= Canal 9 TVN Señal 2 =

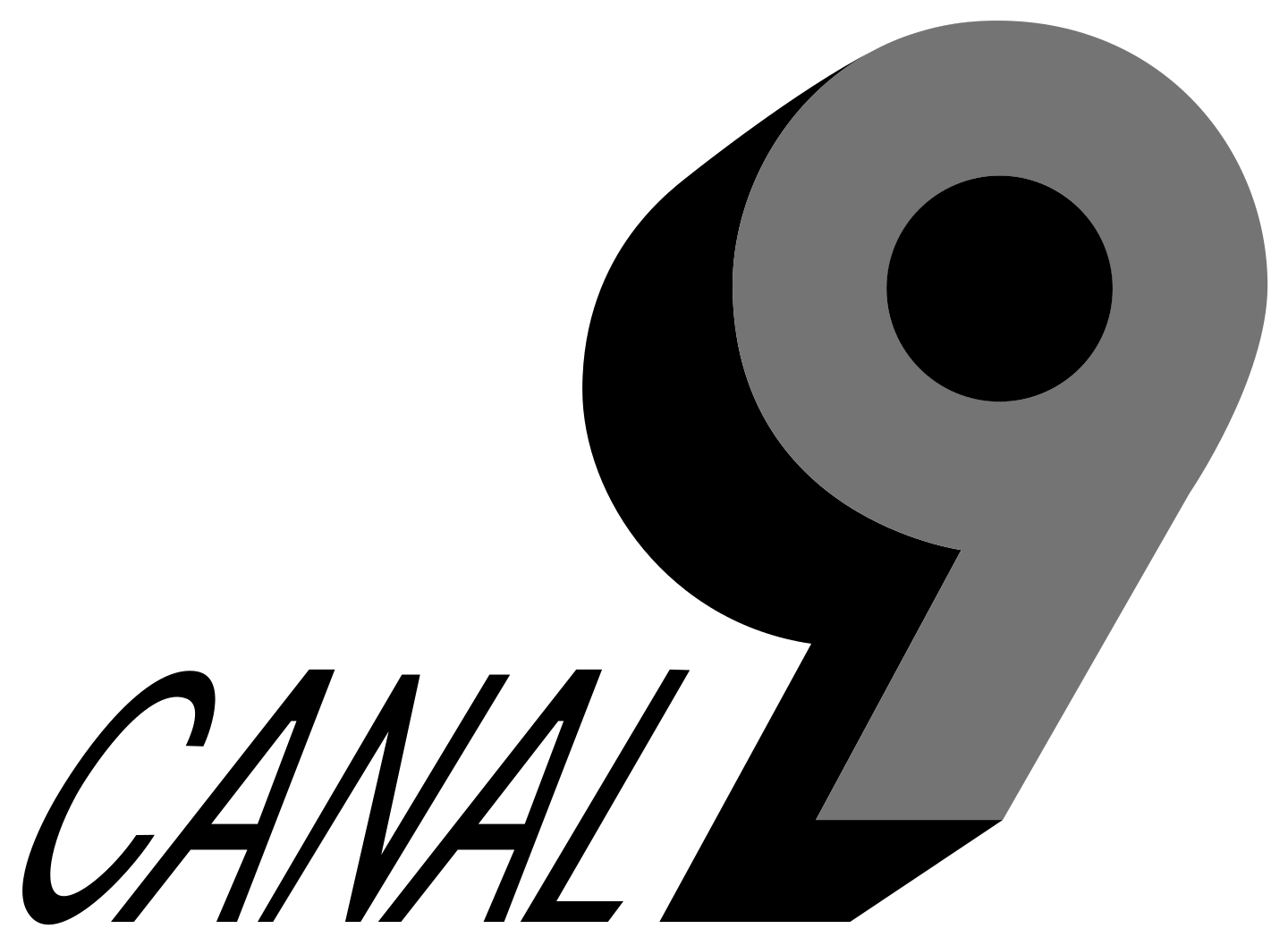
- Country: Chile

Programming
- Language: Spanish

Ownership
- Owner: Televisión Nacional de Chile
- Sister channels: TVN

History
- Launched: 3 June 1986; 40 years ago
- Closed: 24 August 1990; 35 years ago

Availability

Terrestrial
- Santiago: Channel 9

Canal 9 was a Chilean television channel operated by Televisión Nacional de Chile between June 1986 and August 1990 as its second signal, with coverage limited to the Santiago Metropolitan Region. As of 2026, the channel 9 frequency is owned by Mega.

== History ==
After University of Chile (today Chilevisión) moved to channel 11 of Santiago on April 21, 1980, frequency 9 remained vacant for 6 years. At that time, there was speculation about the possible launch of a second TVN channel of a cultural nature for October of that year, which never happened. In 1982, the frequency was granted to Televisión Nacional de Chile, and on May 30, 1986, Subsecretaría de Telecomunicaciones de Chile authorized the channel to broadcast experimental signals in its second network.

=== Frecuencia 9 (1986-1987) ===
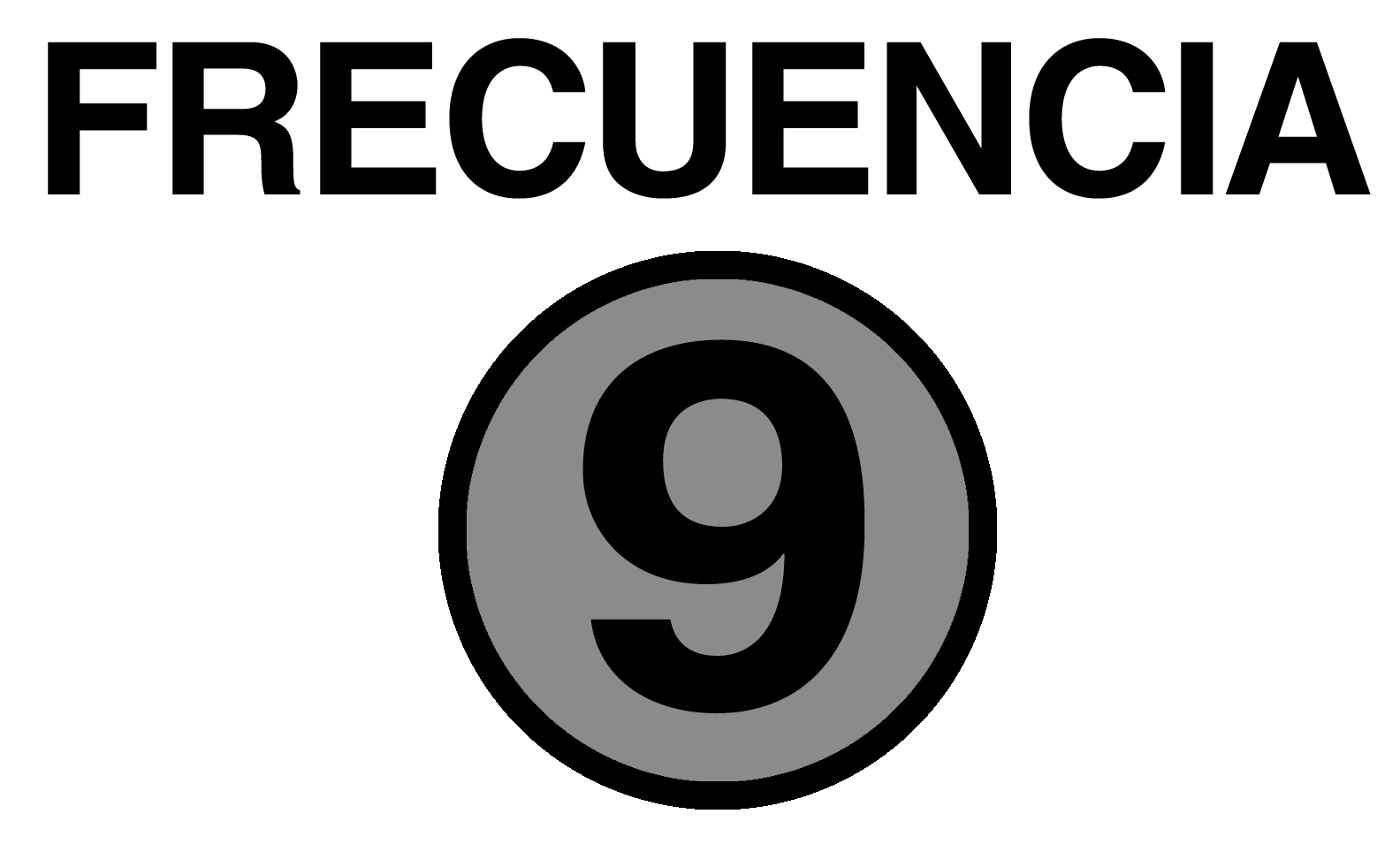
Logo as Frecuencia 9 (1986–1987).

On June 3, 1986, days ahead of the start of the 1986 FIFA World Cup, TVN launched its second signal on an experimental basis, initially known as Frecuencia 9 and with alternative programming to the World Cup broadcast, which included telenovelas and the then main news program of the state channel, 60 minutos. Just one week after the start of broadcasts, on June 11, the programming was substantially modified, eliminating the telenovelas and giving way to documentaries, sports programs - such as Satélite del deporte with Jorge Hevia, which premiered in 1988—, cartoons and feature films, similar to the state-owned stations in Europe, and to not compete with the main TVN network.

=== Canal 9 (1987-1990) ===
Canal 9 officially inaugurated its broadcasts on May 4, 1987, changing its name from Frecuencia 9 to Canal 9 TVN Señal 2. Its initial programming consisted of TV series, cartoons, cultural programs, documentaries and its in-house news program called Noticias, broadcast at 10:30 pm. A similar station, Canal 13 TVN Señal 2, opened in Punta Arenas in 1989.

Before the return to democracy, in September 1989, the outgoing government decided to tender Channel 9 and Channel 4 of San José de Maipo, both frequencies owned by TVN, to private companies, and that would serve as relief for the station's economic losses. Canal 9 TVN Signal 2 definitively ends its broadcasts on Sunday, August 24, 1990; In the meantime, Ricardo Claro wins the Canal 9 tender for USD$ 11 000 000 at the time, and on October 23, 1990, Megavisión started broadcasting.

== Programming ==
- Más Mujeres (1987–1989): women's program presented by Gabriela Velasco
- Noticias (1987–1989): main news presented by Mario Herrera
- Satélite del Deporte (1988–1990): sports program presented by Jorge Hevia
- Vibraciones (1987): music program with Yolanda Montecinos. Later named Intérpretes Nacionales (1987–1989).
- Noticias Literarias (1987–1990): with Hugo Correa.
- Comentarios de Cine: with Mariano Silva.
- Comentarios de Espectáculos: with Yolanda Montecinos.

== Frequencies ==
Aside from channel 9 in Santiago, TVN's second network had frequencies assigned in other cities of Chile, which were never operated and were trespassed to Sociedad Ernesto Pinto Claude y Compañía —which eventually became Megavisión— in January 1990. The frequencies assigned to Canal 9 were:

- Arica: channel 3
- Iquique: channel 2
- Calama/Chuquicamata: channel 6
- Antofagasta: channel 9
- El Salvador: channel 12
- Copiapó: channel 9
- La Serena/Coquimbo: channel 11
- Valparaíso/Viña del Mar: channel 5
- Santiago: channel 9
- San Fernando: channel 9
- Talca: channel 12
- Chillán: channel 9
- Concepción/Talcahuano: channel 2
- Temuco: channel 5
- Valdivia: channel 8
- Osorno: channel 11
- Puerto Montt: channel 2
- Ancud: channel 3
- Castro: channel 6
- Coyhaique: channel 10
- Punta Arenas: channel 12
