= CNN Chile =

Coordinates: 33.391°S 70.614°W

- Country: Chile
- Broadcast area: Chile; Bolivia; Argentina; Paraguay; Uruguay; Peru; Ecuador; Colombia; Venezuela; United States the Caribbean
- Network: CNN
- Headquarters: Av. Pedro Montt 2354, Santiago, Chile

Programming
- Language: Spanish
- Picture format: 1080i HDTV (downscaled to 16:9 480i for the SDTV feed)

Ownership
- Owner: Carey Media Holdings (under license from Skydance (Note: Through CNN Worldwide))
- Sister channels: CNN; CNN International; CNN-IBN; CNN en Español; HLN n-tv CNN Türk; CNN Brasil; CNN Indonesia; CNN Philippines (defunct)

History
- Launched: 4 December 2008; 17 years ago

Links
- Website: www.cnnchile.com

Cable News Network Chile (known as CNN Chile and abbreviated as CNN CL) is a Chilean pay television news channel and news website launched on 4 December 2008. It was originally a joint venture between VTR Chile and WarnerMedia. The channel is based in Santiago, Chile.

It is the local version of popular TV news channel CNN, which had previously shown interest in the Chilean market when it covered the 2005 presidential elections through CNN en Español.

== History ==
Logo used from 2008 to 2017.

The news channel is partnered with free-to-air network Chilevisión since 2010, when Turner Broadcasting System purchased it for $145 million to Sebastian Piñera's family.

Since 2016, it is completely owned by Turner Broadcasting System Latin America as VTR sold its participation in the channel to them.

== Programming ==
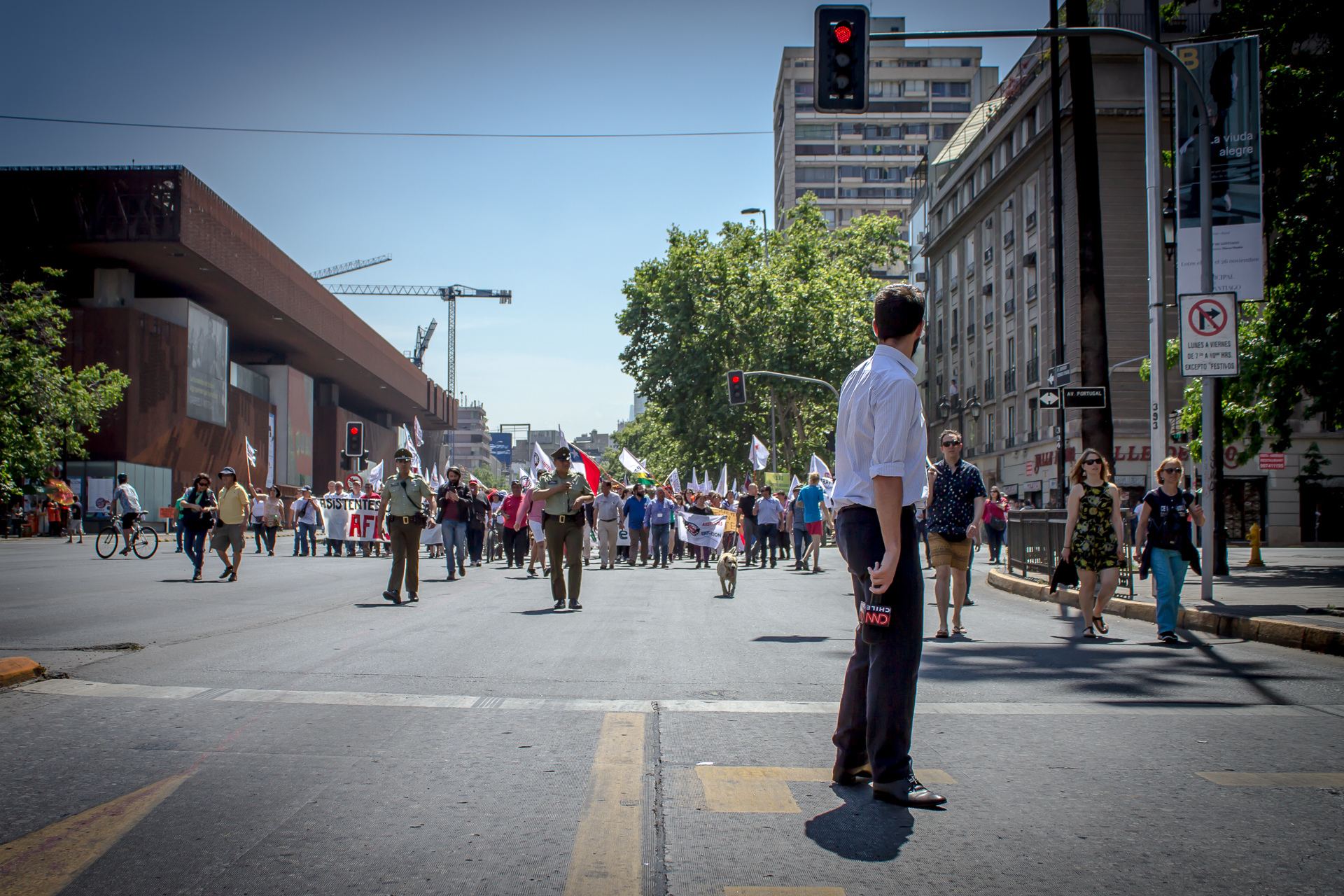
CNN Chile covering a strike march in Santiago November 2016

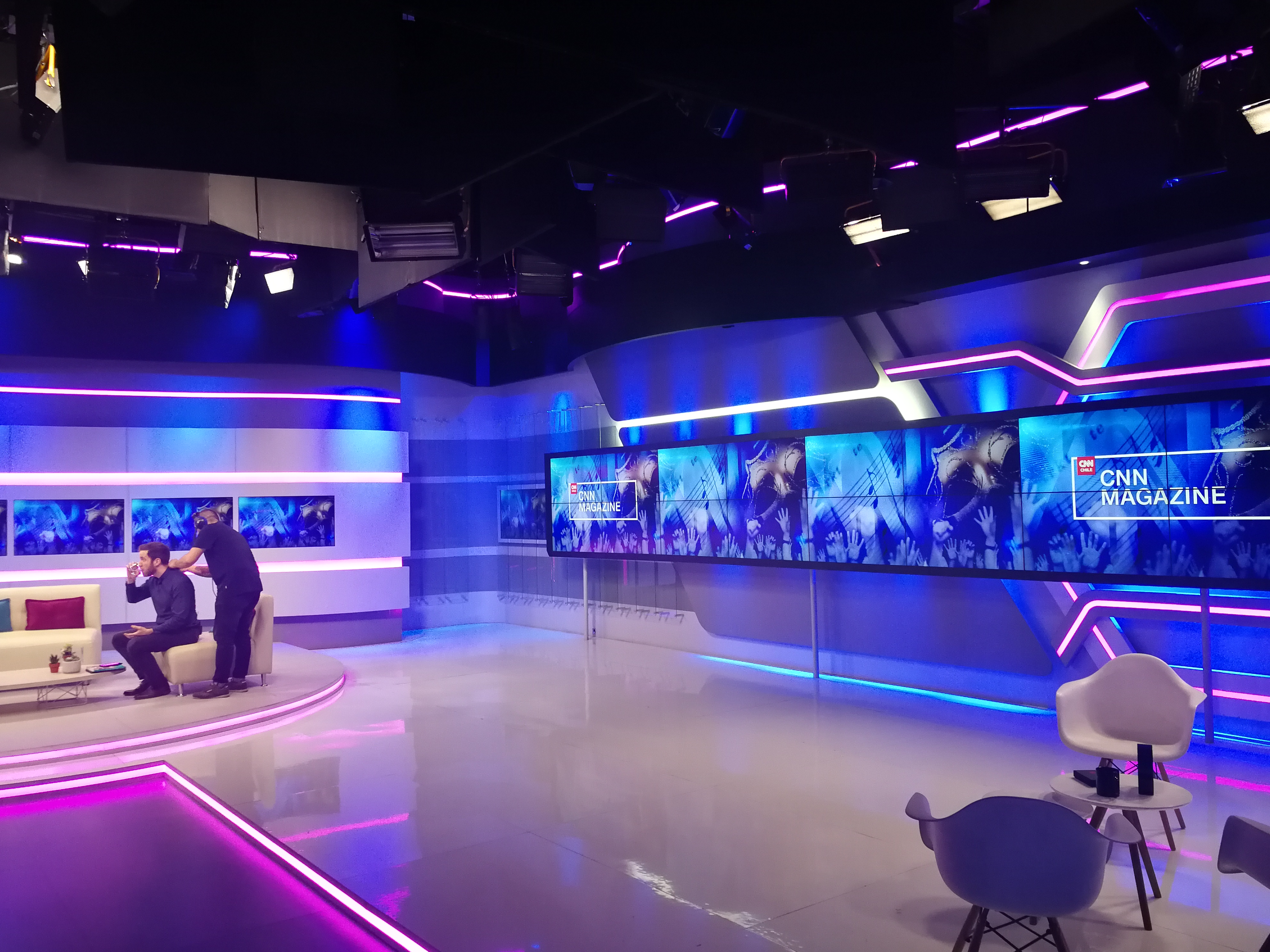
CNN Chile studio

=== Notable current on-air staff ===
- Mónica Rincón – weekdays on CNN Prime, Fridays on Conciencia Inclusiva
- Daniel Matamala – weekdays on CNN Prime
- Sebastián Aguirre – weekdays on Mañana en Directo, Tuesdays on Nuevas Voces
- Viviana Encina – weekdays on Es Noticia
- Matilde Burgos – weekdays on Noticias y Perspectivas and CNN íntimo
- Verónica Schmidt – weekdays on Noticias Express

== Controversies ==
=== 2019 advertisement pulling controversy ===
During 2019, businessman Juan Sutil and food company Agrosuper decided to pull their ads, including some of Agrosuper's brand Super Pollo, from CNN Chile and from Chilevision, purportedly because of a CNN Chile show named "Agenda Agricola", which has shown videos of anti-government protests.
