= 24 horas (Chilean TV program) =

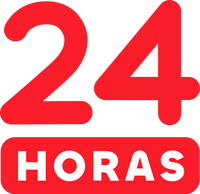
- logo used since 2023
- Genre: News
- Country of origin: Chile

Production
- Producer: Alfredo Ramirez
- Running time: 60–90 minutes

Original release
- Network: TVN
- Release: October 1, 1990 – present

24 horas (English: 24 hours) is the brand that identifies the gathering and broadcasting of news in the Chilean public broadcaster Televisión Nacional de Chile. It started as an informative program of the same television network on 1 October 1990. Then in 2009, it became a television channel called Canal 24 horas.

It has four different editions: "24 Horas Tu Manana" (mornings), "24 Horas Al Dia (midday), "24 Horas central" (evening), and "24 Horas Al Cierre" (late night). National news bulletins are broadcast by TVN, Canal 24 horas, and TV Chile.

== History ==
Its first edition was broadcast on October 1, 1990, led by Cecilia Serrano and Bernardo de la Maza on the "Edición Central". Gradually, the editions of the newscast gained ground in the ratings on rival Canal 13, overtaking the latter in the mid-1990s. On October 10, 2001, coinciding with the première of the soap opera Amores de Mercado (Market's Lover), which preceded the news, the Central Edition scored 42.2 rating points between 21:00 and 21:56, a figure that hasn't been matched since.

On March 8, 2004, it changed its image to match the new logo of TVN. There were other major changes that year; the old presenters, Bernardo de la Maza, and Cecilia Serrano, were replaced with Amaro Gomez-Pablos and Consuelo Saavedra. This move was criticized.

Between 1999 and 2002, it had a fifth edition entitled Edición Vespertina de 24 Horas (24 Horas Evening Edition), which aired at 18:00. It was hosted by Consuelo Saavedra, Mónica Rincón, María Isabel Toloza, and later by journalist María Jesús Sáinz.

Local newscasts are issued at 14:20 and 21:35.

In 2002, the newsletter closed the signal transmitted by the Santiago Metro, called MetroTV. In 2005, she returned to the United States, the journalist Consuelo Saavedra, and assumed the leadership of the main news with Amaro Gómez-Pablos. One of the highlights of the news was its live coverage of the Iraq War and especially the fall of Saddam Hussein, featuring Santiago Pavlovic, Rafael Cavada and cinematographer Alejandro Leal.

In October 2007, 24 Horas started a channel on YouTube, making Televisión Nacional de Chile the first television station in the country with an official presence on the site.

On August 1, 2008, VTR announced that by the end of the year, it will air TVN 24 Horas, a 24-hour news channel that rivals the local branch U.S. news network CNN Chile (which premiered on December 4). The new channel launched in March 2009, becoming the second uninterrupted news channel in the country after CNN Chile, which was launched in December 2008. It was launched with the objective of becoming the definitive news source in the country. Air time is divided into different thematic segments, covering economic, international, sports, local issues, entertainment, and technology, and it broadcasts the three main news programs of TVN. For its international content, it has an alliance with the U.S. MSNBC. After its inauguration, the channel's first long-term coverage was the aftermath of the 2010 Chilean earthquake in the south-central zone of Chile from February 2010.

== Editions ==
=== 24 Horas Tu Mañana ===
The first edition under this name aired on March 12, 2019, and is currently presented by Carla Zunino and Valentina Reyes. Before 2019 it was called "Tu Mañana, 24 horas", "24 Horas en la mañana", "Edición Matinal", "Primera Edición" and 24 AM.

==== Presenters ====
Period	Presenters
1992-1995	Alejandro Guillier
1995-1999	Benjamín Palacios
1999–2019	Mauricio Bustamante
2002-2003	María Jesús Sainz
2003	Carolina Urrejola
2004-2012	Mónica Pérez
2012-2014	Andrea Arístegui
2014	Consuelo Saavedra
2014–2019	Carolina Escobar
2019–2020	Gonzalo Ramirez
2019-	Carla Zunino
2020-	Valentina Reyes

=== 24 Horas al Dia ===
The first edition under this name aired on March 8, 2004, and is currently presented by Patricia Venegas. Between 2004 and 2017 it was called "Edición Uno" "Segunda Edición”, “24 Horas al Dia and 24 Tarde"

==== Presenters ====
Current presenters

- Patricia Venegas (2011-).

Special editions and holidays

- Davor Gjuranovic (2012-).
- Carla Zunino (2009-).
- Fresia Soltof (2013-).

Former presenters

- Mónica Pérez (2004-2012).
- Mónica Rincón (2004-2008).
- Scarleth Cárdenas (2008-2015).
- Andrea Arístegui (2009-2011).
- Pablo Marín (2010-2011).
- Gonzalo Ramírez (2011-2018).
- Carolina Escobar (2013-2018).
- Mauricio Bustamante (2019-2020)

Weather forecast

- Iván Torres (2004-).

=== 24 horas central ===
The first edition under this name aired on March 8, 2004, and is currently presented by Ivan Nuñez and Constanza Santa María. Before 2004 it was called "Edición Central".

=== Medianoche ===
The first edition under this name aired on 1996, and is currently presented by Matías del Río and Marco Flemming Ayala. Before 1996 it was called "Edición Dos" (1990-1992) and "Edición Nocturna".
