= Gabriela Velasco =

Chilean actress and TV presenter

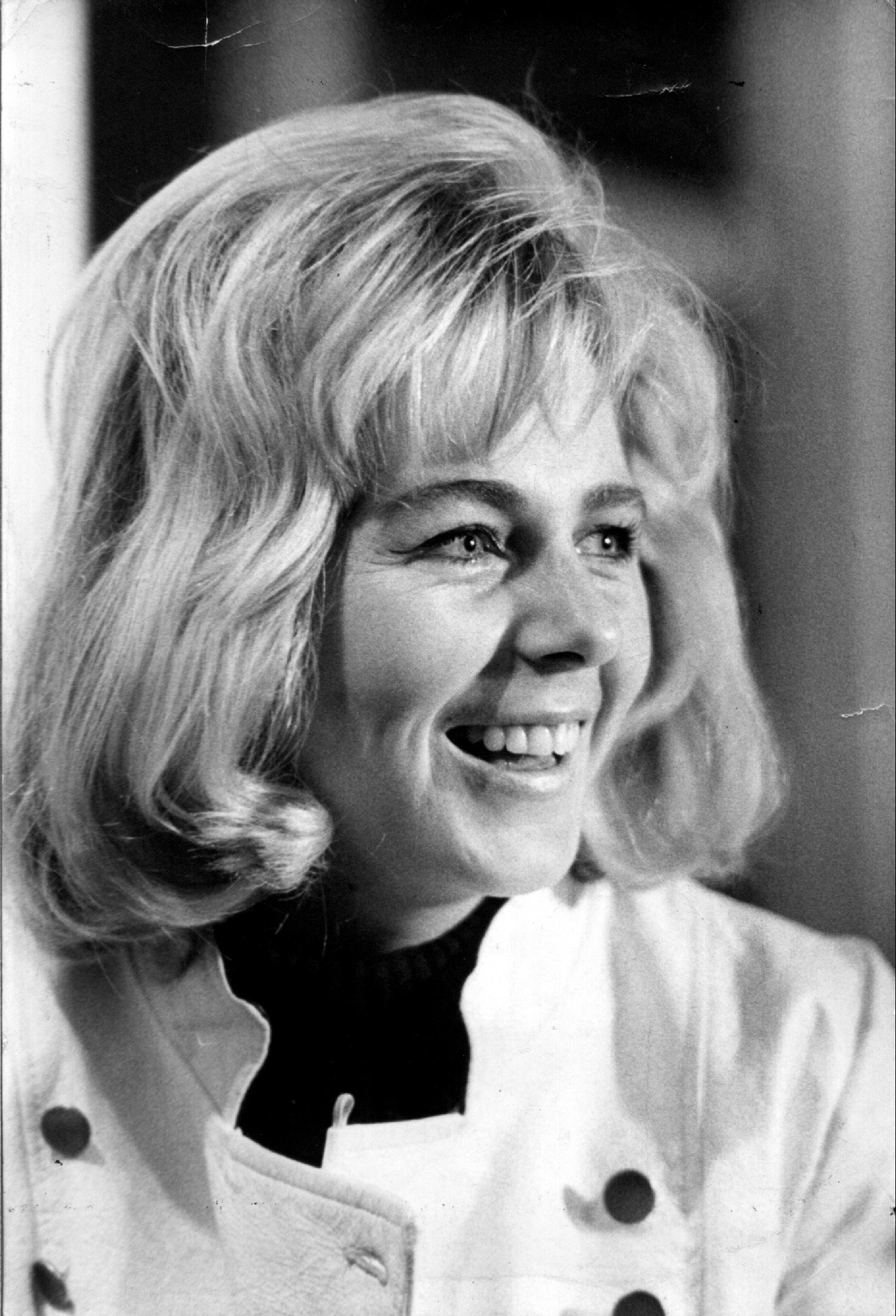
- Gabriela Velasco, 1972
- Born: Gabriela de la Concepción Velasco Vergara; 10 October 1941; Santiago, Chile
- Died: 4 June 2019 (aged 77); Santiago
- Resting place: Catholic Cemetery of Santiago
- Occupations: Actress and television presenter

Gabriela de la Concepción Velasco Vergara (Santiago, 10 October 1941 - Santiago, 4 June 2019) was a Chilean actress and television presenter. A communicator and television pioneer in Chile, Velasco was known most during the early days of television broadcasts, becoming a prominent host with over twenty programs ranging from variety shows to news hosting, weather presenting, and renowned children's programs. Velasco was the first woman to host the inaugural televised transmission of the Viña del Mar International Song Festival in 1972.

== Biography ==
Gabriela de la Concepción Velasco Vergara was the third child of Raúl Velasco García, a member and founder of Los Cuatro Huasos, and Gabriela Vergara Polloni.

She began her television career after being recruited by Canal 13 in 1965, when she accompanied her sister to an audition for the program Esto es Chile. Following that, she had a segment titled "Las cosas de Gabriela" on the show Mientras otros duermen siesta, eventually becoming the main presenter of the show in April 1966. As part of her professional career, she co-hosted the 1972 Viña Festival alongside César Antonio Santis, becoming the first woman to host the televised version of the festival. The children's program El rincón del Conejito TV was recognized by the National TV Council as the best children's program during its two-year run due to its quality and contribution to preschool children. Velasco also hosted popular programs such as TV Tiempo, Tres a las tres, El Cumpleaños Feliz, and Semana a semana, among others.

In partnership with Alicia Puccio and her children's singing group, Velasco released an album titled Feliz en tu Día for the soundtrack of her television program, which was finally released on August 3, 1979.

Velasco was married three times: first to Jorge Luco, who was a player and coach of the Club Deportivo Universidad Católica football club. Her second marriage was to Juan Mackenna Salas, with whom she had a son. Her third marriage was to Edmundo "Bigote" Arrocet, with whom she had a daughter.

Velasco died on June 4, 2019. Her death was announced by her children through social media. Her funeral took place at the Catholic Cemetery of Santiago. At the time of her death, Velasco had six grandchildren and one great-grandchild.
