= Daniel Matamala =

Chilean journalist

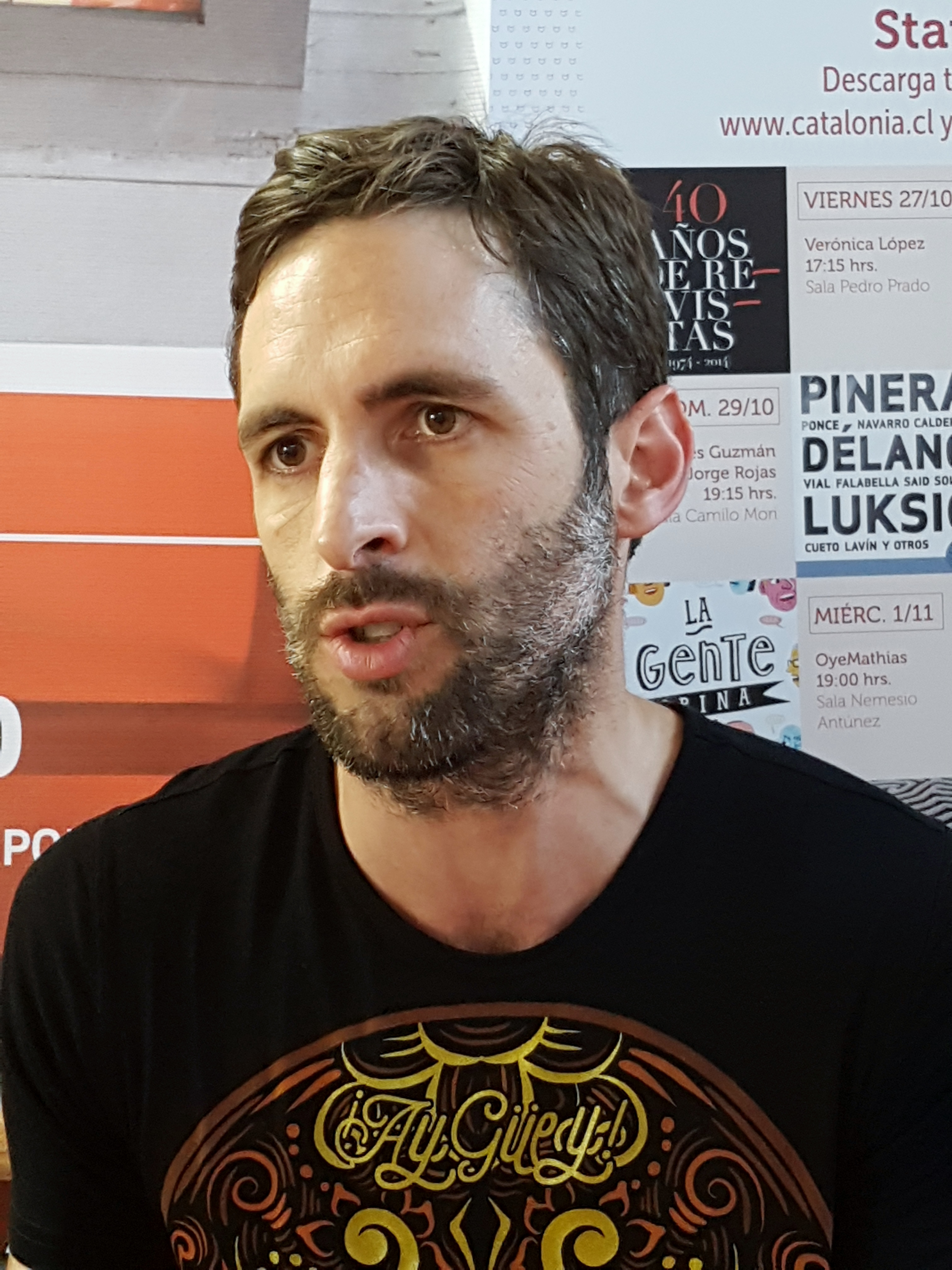

Personal details
- Born: 24 March 1978 (age 48) Valdivia, Chile
- Spouse(s): Pascale Fuentes (2011–2012); Blanca Lewin (2014–2021)
- Children: One
- Parent(s): Roberto Matamala; Rosmarie Thomsen
- Education: Pontifical Catholic University of Chile (BA); Columbia University
- Occupation: TV presenter Researcher; Writer
- Profession: Journalist

Daniel Ignacio Matamala Thomsen (born 24 March 1978) is a Chilean journalist known for his current work in CNN Chile alongside Mónica Rincón.

From 2000 to 2011, Matamala worked on Canal 13, where he became known as the newsreader and the presenter of political and current affairs programs. He is currently the anchor face of CNN Chile and Chilevisión, where he hosts Primera Edición, Chilevisión Noticias, CNN Prime and Ciudadanos.

== Early and personal life ==
Born in 1978, Matamala is the son of Roberto Ignacio Matamala Elorz and Rosmarie Thomsen Binder.

After completing his primary education at the German Institute in the cities of Valdivia and Osorno, he joined the Pontifical Catholic University of Chile (PUC) School of Journalism. From 2011 to 2012, Matamala completed a MA at the Columbia University.

On 12 February 2011, Matamala married the also journalist Pascale Fuentes, from whom he separated in early 2012. In 2013, he began a relationship with actress Blanca Lewin, with whom he married in 2020 after seven years of relationship. Lewin and Matamala had a son, Eloy, in 2016. They divorced in 2021. Since 2023, Matamala has been a relationship with the singer-songwriter Francisca Valenzuela.

== Professional career ==
In 2000, Matamala began his career at Canal 13, where he carried out his professional practice. Until 2004, he was a reporter for the station's Press Department, the year in which he took over as editor of Politics and Economy. Similarly, he was in charge of programs such as Hora de infidentes and Réplica.

Matamala was the co-host of the Efecto Dominó program, first with Mauricio Hofmann (2007–2008) and later with Macarena Puigrredón (2009). From 2008 to 2011, he presented Telenoche, the nightly edition of the newscast Teletrece, replacing Constanza Santa María. Since 2009, Matamala also hosted the newscast for Canal 13 Cable, Telenoche C and Chile debate, together with Santa María. In March 2011, he left the channel's nightly newscast and went on to host the daytime program Teletrece Tarde, along with Carolina Urrejola, in addition to becoming a current affairs panelist on the morning show Bienvenidos.

On 29 July 2011, Matamala left his jobs at Canal 13 and Sonar FM to settle for a year in New York, United States. On 20 August 2012, he joined CNN Chile, where together with Mónica Rincón they lead CNN Prime, previously presented by Ramón Ulloa, his former workmate in Canal 13. On that channel, he has presented the programs Primera Edición and Ciudadanos.

In May 2017, Matamala began to participate as a panelist on the Tolerancia Cero program, broadcast jointly by Chilevisión and CNN Chile. That same year he participated in Aquí está Chile, broadcast by both channels.

Since 2017, he has hosted Meridiano 95.3 on Radio 95.3 FM and also has hosted Sonar Informativo on Radio Sonar FM from Canal 13, his former place of work. In February 2018, he joined Radio Infinita for a few months, where he hosted Quien lo diria, together with Juan Manuel Astorga and Cony Stipicic.
