= Televisión Nacional de Chile =

Chilean public television broadcaster

- Logo used since 2020

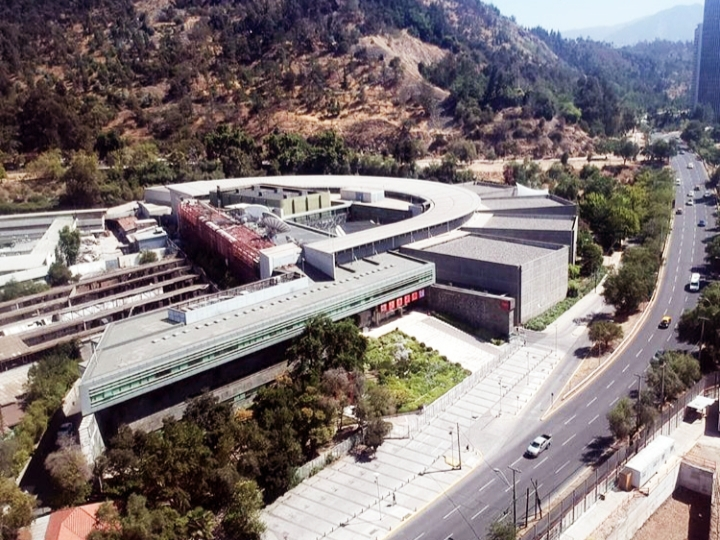
- TVN headquarters in Santiago.
- Type: Free-to-air public service broadcaster
- Country: Chile
- Headquarters: Bellavista 0990 Providencia, Santiago Metropolitan Region, Chile

Programming
- Language: Spanish
- Picture format: 1080i HDTV (downscaled to 480i for the SDTV feed)

Ownership
- Sister channels: NTV; TVN3; TV Chile; Canal 24 Horas

History
- Founded: 31 January 1969
- Launched: 18 September 1969
- Founder: Eduardo Frei Montalva

Links
- Website: www.tvn.cl

Availability

Terrestrial
- Digital VHF: Listings may vary

Televisión Nacional de Chile (TVN) is a Chilean public service broadcaster. It was founded by order of President Eduardo Frei Montalva and it was launched nationwide on 18 September 1969. Since then, the company has been reorganized on several occasions and its operations areas have increased over the years, becoming one of the leading television broadcasters in Chile and South America. Law 17 377 of 1970 established that TVN must be a public, autonomous, pluralistic, and representative public service. TVN's public mission determines the obligation to promote the national cultural identity, the values of democracy, human rights, care for the environment and respect for diversity. Furthermore, Televisión Nacional governs the programming of its services according to criteria established by the National Television Council (CNTV).

Televisión Nacional has been a pioneer in introducing technological advances in Chile. It was the first television network to have national coverage, satellite broadcast, colour television, stereo sound, and high-definition television. Several of their soap operas have reached the highest ratings in the history of Chilean television, and are recognized both in that country and abroad for their social content, realism and settings, while its news programs have been crucial in catastrophes such as the 2010 earthquake and aftermath, when TVN news teams arrived in the affected areas before the National Army and government authorities. Currently, TVN has higher pluralism in its programmes and is the second most credible television news brand in the country.

Its headquarters are located in Providencia, Santiago Metropolitan Region and it employs 638 total staff. Furthermore, TVN has nine additional television centres in the country. The company is directed through a chairperson appointed by the President of the Republic, which has a duration of four years, synchronized with the presidential period. The other six members of the board of directors are appointed three times per period in an agreement between the Senate and the President of the Republic for eight years. To them, a seventh member is added who is chosen democratically by the staff. Currently, the chairperson of Televisión Nacional de Chile is Andrea Fresard, while the executive director and legal representative is Alfredo Ramírez.

Televisión Nacional is the only publicly owned television company in Chile and competes with other private broadcasting networks, having a self-financing scheme based mainly on the advertising sales that it has preserved since its inception and later regulated by Act 19,132 of 1992. TVN, under Act 20,694 of 2013, can fulfill the tasks of the exploitation of television services and the production of audiovisual or broadcasting content, as well as acting as a concessionaire of telecommunications services. Additionally, it is affiliated with the Asociación Nacional de Televisión or Anatel (National Association of Television) and the Council of Self-Regulation and Advertising Ethics, among others.

Worldwide, the channel is gaining recognition thanks to their original TV series 31 Minutos.

== History ==
The origins of television in Chile took ground after the promulgation of the Television Law 7,039 on 28 October 1958, which was the first legislation of its kind in that country. This regulation was decreed and implemented by the government of then President Jorge Alessandri given the need to regulate the only three existing channels in the national territory: Canal 13, Canal 9 and UCV Television, which at that time were university property and therefore were private broadcasters.

The essential need to own a channel belonging to the Chilean State took relevance from the 1960s, as the great challenge that the government of Eduardo Frei Montalva wanted to face, believing ideally, the existence of a public television station with national coverage, capable of transmitting in a territory of large geographical features. To this end, a limited liability company was created whose original partners were the entrepreneurship agency CORFO, the production company Chilefilms and Entel, all of which were public companies at the time, establishing Televisión Nacional de Chile on 31 January 1969 through the telecommunications trunk network of that country and a series of test transmissions that remained until several years later.

=== 1968–69: Development of Televisión Nacional ===
==== Establishment ====
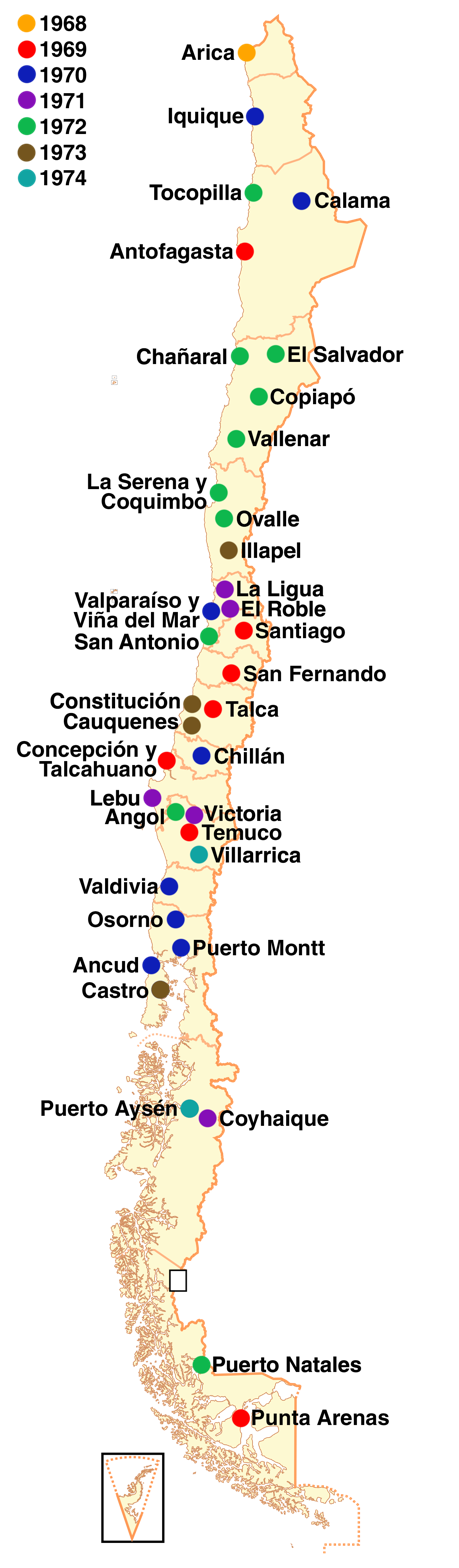
Main Chilean cities where TVN channels were installed between 1968 and 1974

The first regional station established by Televisión Nacional de Chile was Arica's channel 7, with the support of the Board of Advancement of Arica (Junta de Adelanto de Arica), initiating its broadcast on 12 December 1968 with provisional studios located in the Edificio Plaza and its transmitter located then in the Morro de Arica. It was officially inaugurated on the same day by President Eduardo Frei Montalva, counting only on programming relayed from Santiago. Subsequently, on 1 February 1969, the broadcast of channel 6 of Punta Arenas began with an inauguration attended by President Eduardo Frei Montalva, as well as the Intendant of Magallanes, Mateo Martinic. The day before, 31 January, was the day TVN was officially incorporated as a public enterprise, it is still marked as the birthday of the network.

==== Initial expansion ====
On 21 May 1969, Talca began to receive TVN broadcasts on channel 10 directly from Santiago, although the Santiago channel would not be officially inaugurated until some months later. On 15 July 1969, the broadcast of channel 6 of Antofagasta was officially inaugurated, making some local programs and receiving programming from Santiago with some days of delay. Finally, on 18 September of that year, on Independence Day, TVN in Santiago on channel 7 signed on to cover Independence Day celebrations, and is still the flagship station, providing network-produced live coverage of national events, which are occasionally simulcast by other stations nationwide. This channel had previously and experimentally broadcast Chile's matches in the Davis Cup that year, the presidential message to Congress of 21 May (Navy Day) and the arrival of man on the Moon that July.

=== 1969–73: Establishment of the national network ===
==== Establishment and initial studios ====
Regular broadcasts of Televisión Nacional began officially in Santiago on Independence Day, on 18 September 1969, covering 6 of the 25 provinces of the national territory at the time, and having stable programming with more than twelve hours of daily broadcast, although unlike what was expected, operating under the model of subsidiaries or associated channels in the provinces. Initially, the first studios of the new network were concentrated in a house leased to the family of the poet Vicente Huidobro, located at the intersections of Libertador General Bernardo O'Higgins Avenue (Alameda) and San Martín Street, near the Torre Entel. They later moved to one side of the Santiago Metropolitan Cathedral and finally, the then-new permanent studios were inaugurated on 20 August 1970 in Providencia.

==== Expansion across Chile ====
The expansion of the main signal was carried out in Iquique on 23 May 1970 on channel 10, while on 2 July, TVN was launched in Calama and Chuquicamata, also on channel 10. In August of the same year, the expansion of the network included Valdivia on channel 3, Osorno on channel 5, Puerto Montt on channel 4, and Ancud on channel 7. Subsequently, its expansion would reach new locations, such as Coyhaique on 21 May 1971, La Serena and Coquimbo on channel 4 in June 1972, and Castro on channel 10 in early 1973. TVN, already positioned as a means of information at the beginning of that decade, had to be ordered by Law 17,377 of 1970, which provided legal recognition to the station and made it "public", since Law 7039 of 1958 did not contemplate this.

==== Usage as a propaganda tool ====
Originally, the network's mission was to be a pluralistic and independent media of the current government, which was intended to "integrate, inform, entertain and give culture to the Chilean family", as proposed by the Ministry of Education and the group of professionals who directed TVN. In later years, the governments of President Salvador Allende initially and later dictator, Augusto Pinochet, used the channel as a means of spreading propaganda and political ideology to support their governments and ideologies.

=== 1973–90: Military dictatorship ===
==== Temporary closure, occupation by Canal 13, and reopening ====
On 11 September 1973, after the coup d'état in the morning, Televisión Nacional did not start broadcasting during the day and the studios were closed for three days. There was also an assault on the headquarters, where abundant amounts of audiovisual material were burned by the military, including a large part of the records of the first years of broadcast. During the three days it was closed, Canal 13 decided to occupy TVN's national network, because it was the only one authorized to broadcast after the coup d'état. After resuming the broadcast, it became the official television network of the new military dictatorship with informative management and strong control in the programming, granting an advantage in audiences to Canal 13 news programme Teletrece, which was considered "more liberal". In January 1975, it opened a station in Easter Island.

==== Colour television ====
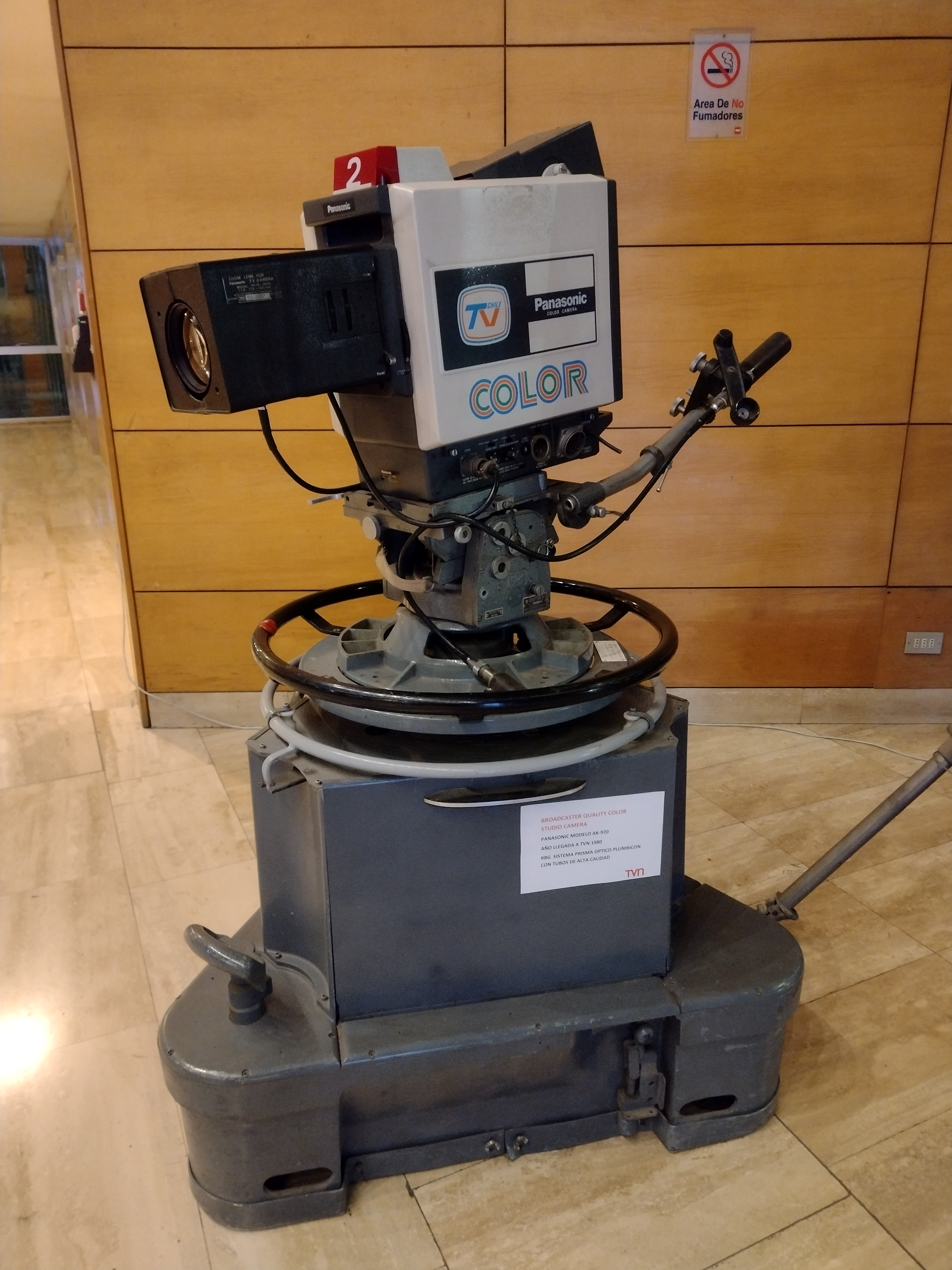
An old colour-television camera used by Televisión Nacional, made by Panasonic

The first experimental colour broadcast in Chile was developed by Televisión Nacional in the final night of the Viña del Mar International Song Festival on 6 February 1978. However, Decree 480, which was in force since 10 September 1976, restricted the import of colour television sets. This regulation, promulgated by Augusto Pinochet, was abolished on 10 April 1978, with the promulgation of a new resolution, ending the restrictions and therefore officially beginning broadcasts in color, adopting the NTSC format from the United States as the official system. At the time of the authorization and start-up, a large part of the network's programming was already in place, and programmes such as La cafetera voladora were fully developed with this technology. This allowed the use of innumerable special effects. It astonished the children of the time and could extend until 1982, setting a precedent in the production of programmes of this type in Chile.

==== Advances and reform ====
During Pinochet's regime, TVN's network was one of the most extensive of the Americas, possessing, as of 1985, 112 transmitting stations, from Arica to Puerto Williams, covering 97% of Chile's area.

Throughout the 1980s, Televisión Nacional grew with diverse programmes and technological advances. It became the first Chilean television network to broadcast its programming via satellite, released its second channel in 1986, and inaugurated its international service in 1989. However, despite all the technical achievements, the company is criticized for its newscast, 60 Minutos, by misrepresenting the news and information that every day reverberated society during this period.

In addition to the loss of credibility, prestige, and audience, this led to the reorganization and rethinking the mission and identity of Televisión Nacional at times of political instability in Chile, as the last months of the regime were being developed, therefore, in democracy, the company seeks to be reformed and the new government authorities were prepared to make all kinds of changes.

=== 1990–2000: Return to democracy and new organisation model ===
With the arrival of the 1990s and the return to democracy, under the mandate of President Patricio Aylwin, he decreed the second Law of Television 19,132 of 1992. This was debated widely between the government and opposition, consecrating the publicly owned network like an autonomous company with legal personality in its own right and establishing that its assets must be managed by a board of directors, whose designation involved the President of the Republic and the Senate, as well as a representative of the staff.

This legislation sought to transform TVN into a media, autonomous, pluralistic, and representative, achieving the original objective proposed at the outset of programmatic content impartiality trying to have independence from the government. Another factor was the complementation of a self-financing system, not receiving public funds. Subsequently, the second channel, Canal 9, was acquired by businessman Ricardo Claro and converted into Red Televisiva Megavisión (Mega).

==== Further advances ====
With the new organisation model, TVN achieved major accomplishments, such as the creation of new regional television centres, the creation of the online service, TVN.cl, in 1998, the first experimental broadcast in high definition in 1999, and a complete remodeling the Santiago headquarters in 2000, whose first stage was inaugurated in 2002 and the second stage in 2005.

=== Expansion of audiences (2000–2015) ===
TVN received the so-called "new millennium" with the special program 2000 Hoy (2000 today) that was broadcast in various segments during the day of 31 December 1999 and featured the participation of various faces of the channel. The space broadcast live the arrival of the year 2000 from different parts of the world and during the night after the message on the national network by President Eduardo Frei Ruiz-Tagle, a musical show was broadcast from the center of Santiago to await the new year in Chile. Since then, the success of the channel continued at the end of the 1990s, and with the arrival of 2000, several programs became popular, such as the telenovela Romané, which obtained 50 audience points in its final episode. Additionally, that year it also broadcast the 2000 Sydney Olympics.

On the afternoon of 19 December 2000, the resignation of René Cortázar from his position as executive director was announced, after a controversy surrounding the episode La CIA en Chile of the Informe Especial program that detailed the intervention of the Central Agency of US intelligence during the government of President Salvador Allende. Before the broadcast, some board members asked the executive director to intervene. Cortázar requested modifications in the program to the press director, Jaime Moreno, but the latter refused and finally, the program was broadcast in its entirety in November of that year. This caused the abrupt departure of René Cortázar, despite the fact that during his tenure in his last year, TVN experienced a period of economic prosperity with profits in excess of three billion pesos.

== Programming ==
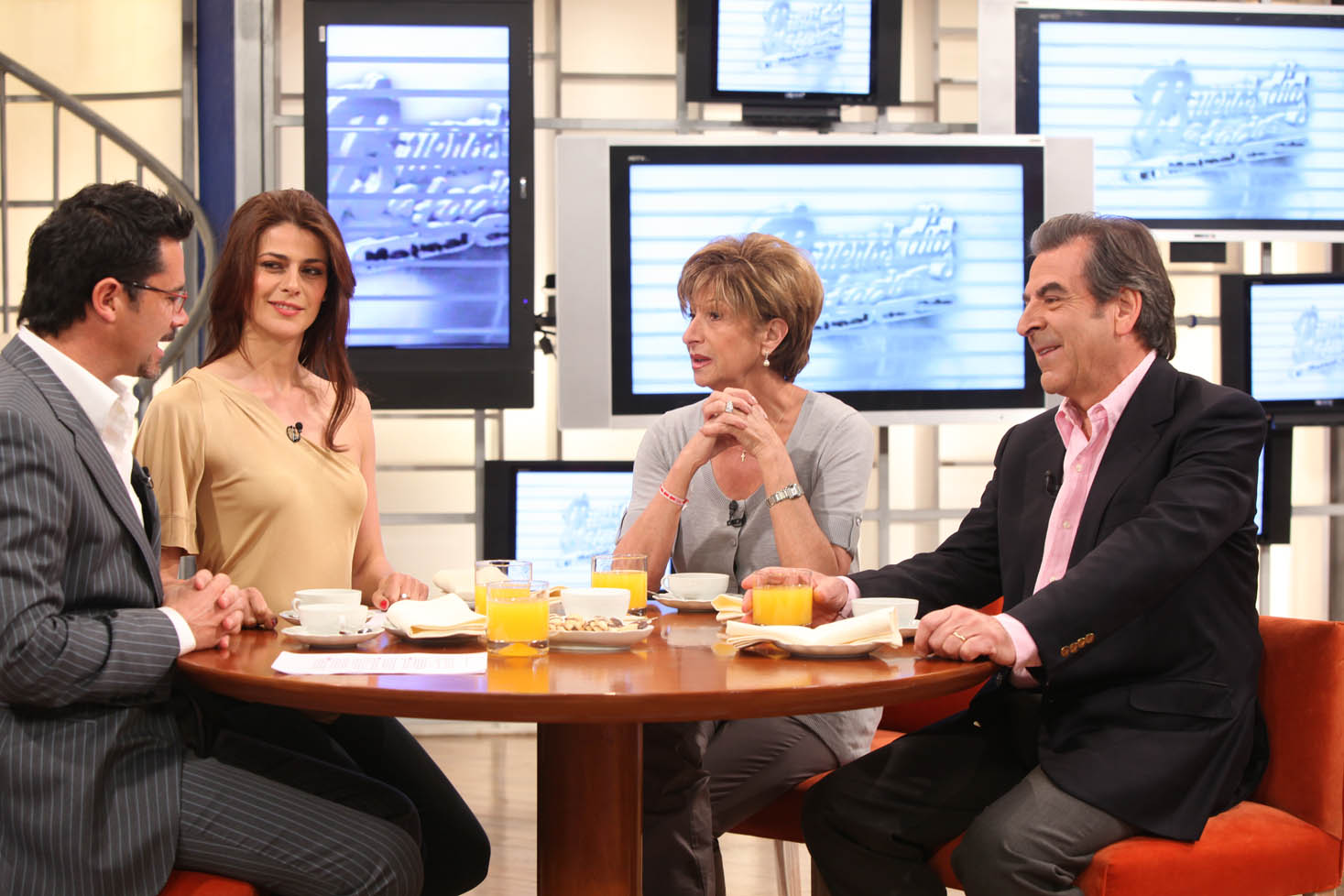
President Eduardo Frei Ruiz-Tagle and First Lady Marta Larraechea in October 2009, invited to the morning programme Buenos días a todos.

With diverse programmes, Televisión Nacional de Chile has produced and created its own spaces, as well as in association with various production companies. In addition, it has broadcast information, fiction, foreign content, and sporting events since its inception. Every day the nationwide channel starts its broadcasts with the news programme 24 AM, followed by a space that occupies a large part of the morning programming. During the afternoon two main news programmes are broadcast, 24 Tarde at 1:00 pm and 24 horas central at 9:00 pm, where the last one is considered as the flagship evening news.

The soap operas and series of own production or foreign origin have usually occupied since the beginning of the channel, the afternoon schedule, however, also since 2004, TVN has broadcast soap operas at night. Additionally, in the afternoon, apart from the dramas, programmes such as Rojo are broadcast. In the evening, after 24 horas central, the weather forecast is broadcast on TV Tiempo and then programmes or soap operas. Next, the midnight newscast Medianoche is broadcast. During the weekends, cultural, children's, or political discussion programmes such as El informante and Estado nacional are presented.

The news from Chile and the world is presented under the brand 24 horas since 1990, with several daily editions, and all the news programmes are part of the 24-hours news channel Canal 24 horas that breaks into the national channel's usual programming in an emergency, delivering news bulletins, including live broadcast during earthquakes. Previously the news carried the name of Telediario, Martini al instante, Noticiero, the controversial 60 minutos, TVNoticias, and finally Noticias before its current name.

=== Special programming ===
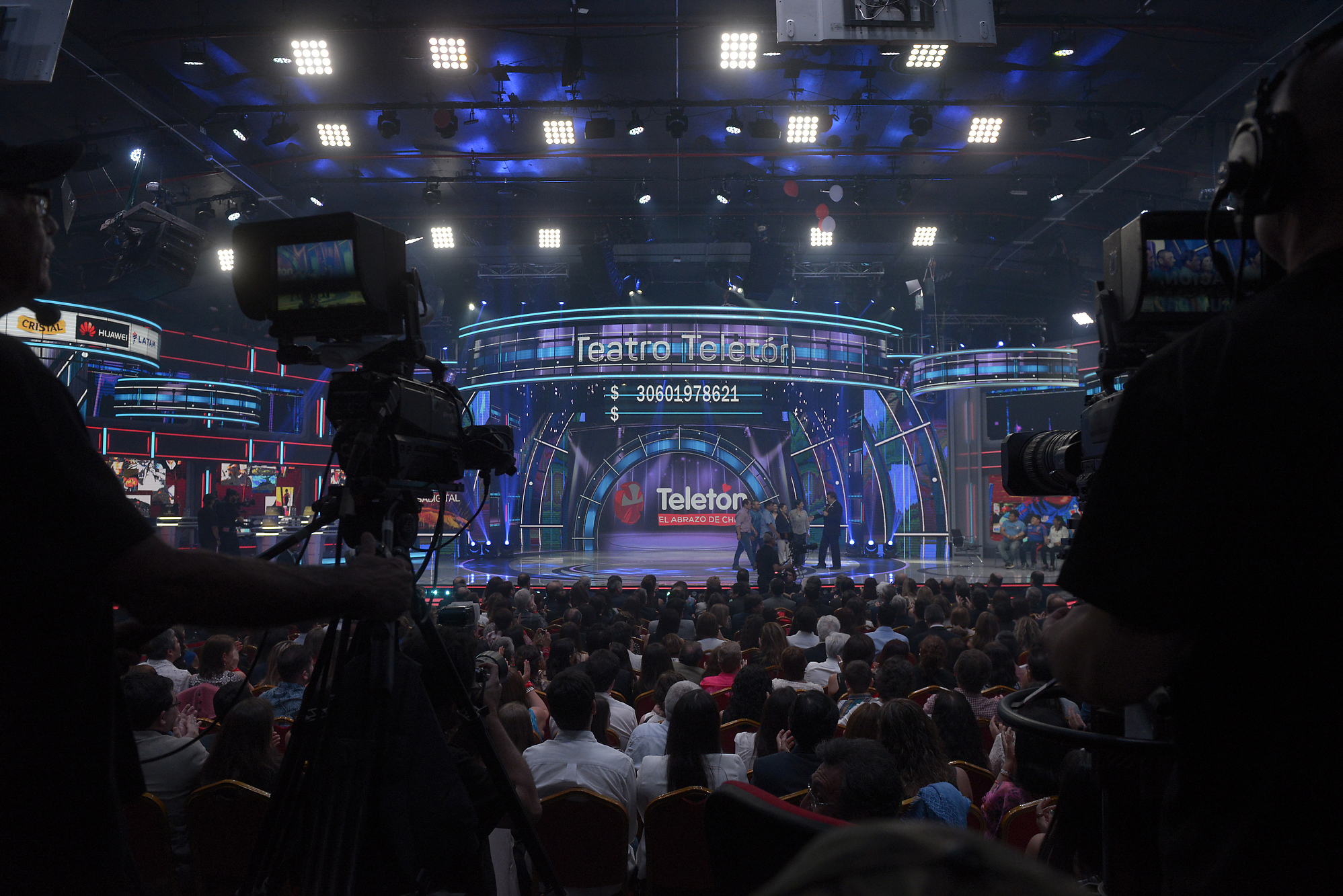
The fundraising event Teletón in 2016.

Some special programmes that TVN broadcasts on an annual basis or from time to time, are the presidential debates that are organized by the National Television Association, general elections, special events, the messages of the President of the Republic and also the televised fundraising event Teletón, usually at the end of each year, along with other channels of Chilean television and has done so since the first edition of the event since 1978 for 27 hours like every other. Another activity that is covered annually is the pyrotechnic and musical show of the new year's celebrations in Valparaíso. Previously, celebrations in Santiago were issued in past decades.

Televisión Nacional has been the official network of the Viña del Mar International Song Festival from 1971 to 1993, between 2007 and 2010, and again between 2019 and 2024; the Festival del Huaso de Olmué from 1989 to 1990, and again since 2014; the Fiesta de la Independencia de Talca between 2016 and 2019; and also in past decades broadcast the OTI Festival. Some sporting events that are and have been displayed on TVN are the Summer Olympic Games (also the Paralympic Games in 2021) and some Winter editions, the FIFA World Cup, the Copa América, the Santiago Marathon, Pan American Games, and in the past until the Formula 1, among other events.

The network broadcasts the Great Military Parade of Chile, a parade that takes place every year in Chile on 19 September in O'Higgins Park in Santiago. The broadcast achieves high audience ratings in conjunction with other television channels, but especially in TVN because it is the channel that makes the television production of the event.

== Services ==
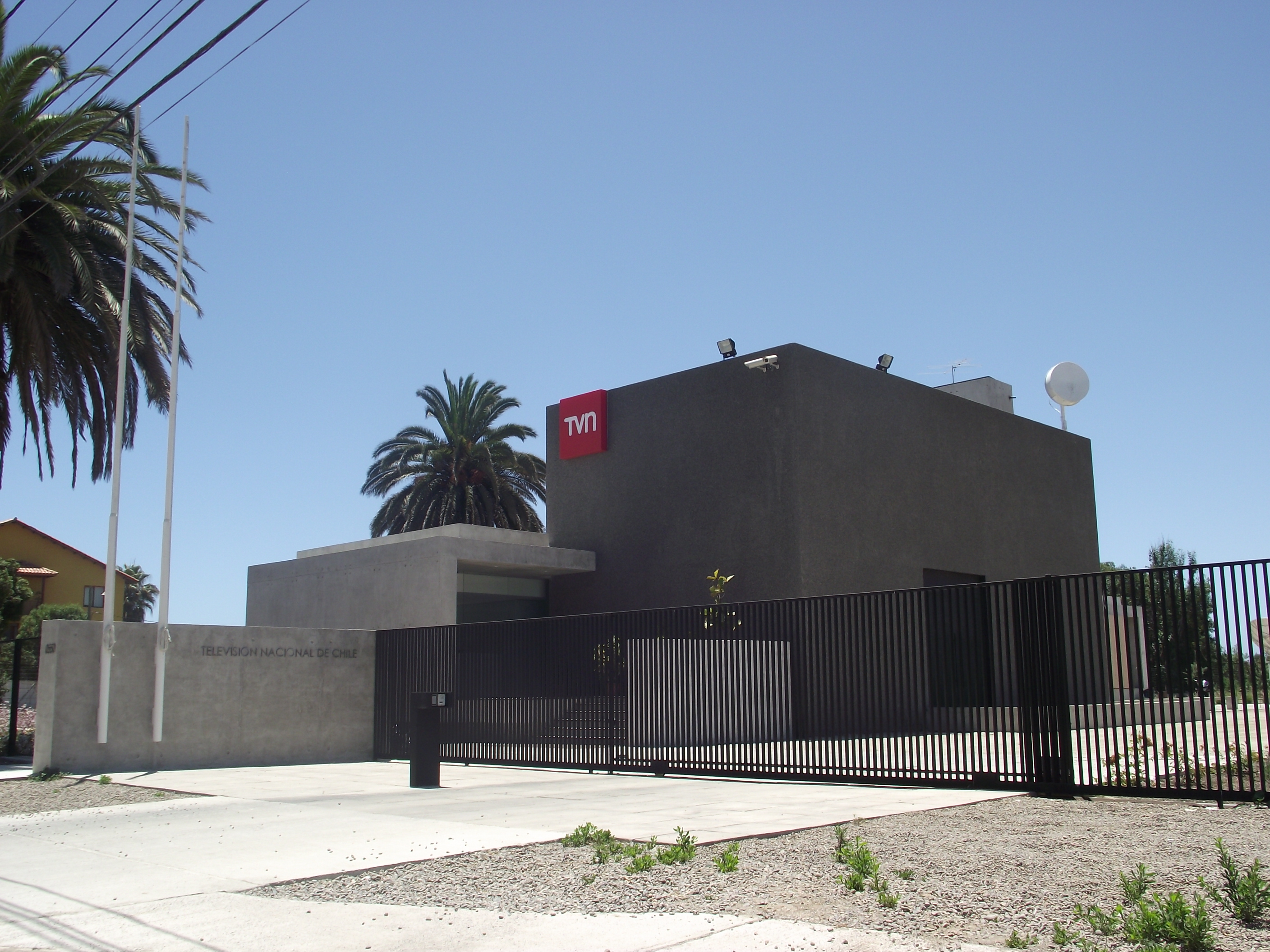
The regional television centre in La Serena, Coquimbo Region.

Among its signals is considered a main channel of free reception which transmits by satellite to several repeaters that are located in Chilean territories, having a reach of 98% of the population. It also has nine regional channels with its own production centres, an international service called TV Chile; the news channel Canal 24 Horas and its internet counterpart 24Play; online presence with several sites, the music label TVN Records and a free streaming service called TVN Play.

Name		Type	Area	Creation date	Description
TVN		Free to air TV channel	Chile	18 September 1969; 57 years ago	Generalist programming. Main channel of the company.
NTV		Free to air TV channel	Chile	8 August 2021; 5 years ago	Educative, cultural programming.
TVN 3		Cable TV channel	Chile	26 July 2023; 3 years ago	Archival programming.
TV Chile		Cable TV channel	Chile; Worldwide	10 March 1989; 37 years ago	International TV channel.
Canal 24 Horas		Cable TV channel	Worldwide	4 March 2009; 17 years ago	News TV channel.
24 Play		Internet TV channel	Worldwide	1 July 2017; 9 years ago	News TV channel. Simulcast of Canal 24 Horas for internet services.
TVN Play		Streaming	Worldwide	1 September 2016; 10 years ago	Streaming service for people outside Chile.
TVN Play		Streaming	Chile	5 July 2021; 5 years ago	Free streaming service for people living in Chile.
Regional network
TVN Regiones	Red Antofagasta	Free to air TV channel	Antofagasta	11 April 1996; 30 years ago	Generalist programming.
TVN Regiones	Red Atacama	Free to air TV channel	Atacama	1992; 34 years ago	Generalist programming.
TVN Regiones	Red Coquimbo	Free to air TV channel	Coquimbo	28 June 1993; 33 years ago	Generalist programming.
TVN Regiones	Red Valparaíso	Free to air TV channel	Valparaíso	15 August 1991; 35 years ago	Generalist programming.
TVN Regiones	Red O'Higgins	Free to air TV channel	O'Higgins	June 1993; 33 years ago	Generalist programming.
TVN Regiones	Red Maule	Free to air TV channel	Maule	5 February 1991; 35 years ago	Generalist programming.
TVN Regiones	Red Biobío	Free to air TV channel	Ñuble and Biobío	3 July 1990; 36 years ago	Generalist programming.
TVN Regiones	Red Araucanía	Free to air TV channel	Araucanía	1991; 35 years ago	Generalist programming.
TVN Regiones	Red Austral	Free to air TV channel	Magallanes	1 February 1969; 57 years ago	Generalist programming.

=== Regional services ===
- TVN Red Antofagasta (Antofagasta Region).
- TVN Red Atacama (Atacama Region).
- TVN Red Coquimbo (Coquimbo Region).
- TVN Red Valparaíso (Valparaíso Region).
- TVN Red O'Higgins (O'Higgins Region).
- TVN Red Maule (Maule Region).
- TVN Red Biobío (Bío Bío Region and Ñuble Region).
- TVN Red Araucanía (Araucanía Region).
- TVN Red Austral (Magallanes and Chilean Antarctica Region).

== Headquarters and regional centres ==
The official headquarters of Televisión Nacional de Chile is located in Providencia, Santiago Metropolitan Region. The complex is the home of the national channel, the internet and worldwide services, music label, and Fox Sports Chile. Inaugurated in 1970, the renovation of the building began in 1999 and was completed in 2005. On 1 December 2004, the station suffered a fire due to an electrical failure. The incident caused the interruption of the main channel for one hour. There were no injuries or deaths and four fire companies controlled the fire.

The centre is familiar to many Chilean citizens and is currently a site visited by tour guides. Within the enclosure is an esplanade known as "Patio de las Comunicaciones", occasionally used for corporate events and television programmes. The complex also includes 3 studios for the drama area, a center for domestic, global, and online news divisions and the sports area, a video editing room, an auditorium, warehouses of props, files of documentation, a cafeteria, dressing rooms for artists and technical staff, technical areas, office areas for the board of directors, general management, general secretary, administration and finance, press, as well as 2 levels of underground car parks.

Televisión Nacional de Chile has production centres with newsrooms and studios in Antofagasta, Copiapó, La Serena, Valparaíso, Rancagua, Talca, Concepción, Temuco and Punta Arenas. In addition, a commercial office in Arica y Parinacota Region.

== Structure and governance ==
=== Chairpersons of the Board of Directors ===
- 1969–1970: Mario Mosquera
- 1970–1973: Eugenio González Rojas
- 1992–1994: Jorge Donoso
- 1994–2000: Luis Ortiz Quiroga
- 2000–2001: Jorge Navarrete Martínez
- 2001–2004: Marco Colodro Hadjes
- 2004–2006: Carlos Mladinic
- 2006–2007: Francisco Vidal Salinas
- 2008: Pablo Keller Huberman
- 2008–2010: Mario Papi
- 2010–2012: Leonidas Montes Lira
- 2012–2013: Carlos Zepeda Hernández
- 2013–2014: Mikel Uriarte Plazaola
- 2014–2018: Ricardo Solari
- 2018: Francisco Orrego
- 2018–2019: Bruno Baranda
- 2019–present: Ana Holuigue

== Corporate identity ==
=== Mascots ===
From 1970 to 1973, the network had a mascot named Tevito, accompanied by "Charagua" as characteristic music that was composed by Víctor Jara and performed by Inti-Illimani. After the coup d'état on 11 September 1973, Tevito was suddenly removed from the advertisements, several video tapes where it appeared were destroyed by the Chilean Army, and finally, it was replaced by other characters. However, Tevito was again used symbolically on 11 March 1990, on the day of the presidential inauguration of Patricio Aylwin. Currently, "Charagua" in Chile is usually related to Televisión Nacional as de facto institutional theme.

==== Tevito ====
Tevito was a smiling cartoon dog personified in various ways. Sometimes, he was a boxer, sometimes he wore reading glasses, and also disguised himself as a vampire. He played the trutruca, a typical instrument of the Mapuche indigenous people of southern Chile. More often, Tevito, in the manner of a chinchinero, carried on his back a bass drum carrying the first network logo with both long mallets hitting the drum, with a set of suspended cymbals similar to a drum kit on top of the drum. The character was created by Carlos González, a student of the Fine Arts Institute in Santiago, Chile, whose drawing won the competition among six other submissions. Since then Tevito become part of the Chilean popular culture.

==== Ito e Ita ====
Ito e Ita was the second mascot of TVN. It debuted in 1974 and remained on screen until 1978 with the arrival of color television, they were usually accompanied by music from the band Los Huasos Quincheros.

==== Conejito TV ====
In 1979 a third mascot designed for colour broadcast named Conejito TV, was presented. Conejito TV remained until 1984 and was usually accompanied by Gabriela Velasco.

==== Clorofilo ====
In 1987, it was presented a mascot that consisted of a green extraterrestrial without name. The extraterrestrial was finally baptized as Clorofilo, in reference to the green chlorophyll, after a contest. Finally, Clorofilo was removed from the screen in mid-1988 and since then they have not used characters of that type as mascots.

=== Logos ===
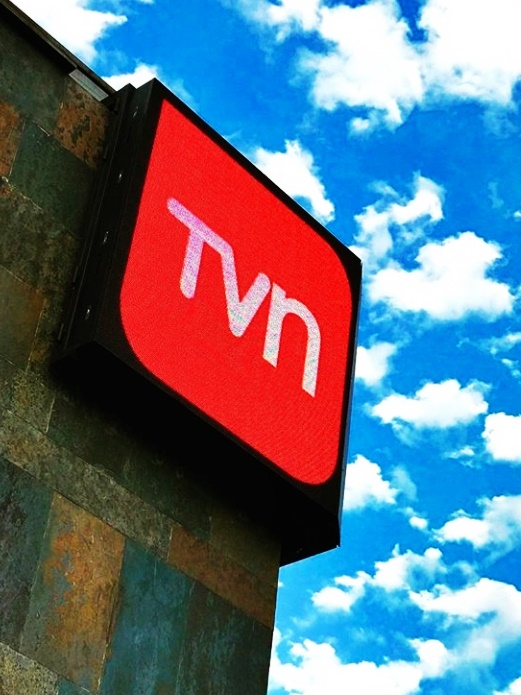
The TVN logo in its headquarters in Santiago

Televisión Nacional de Chile has a corporate identity based on the promotion and strengthening of the Chilean culture. Since its inception, the colours of the national flag have been used mostly to identify the company in their logos, such as the current one where the red colour predominates.

==== Logo history ====
The original logo, which made its debut on 18 September 1969, featured a "screen" with the borders corresponding with the colors of the Chilean flag. Inside the "screen", it has the TV Chile typograph (unrelated to the TV Chile international service), but the texts T and Chile were initially black before switching to blue on 6 February 1978, corresponding with the arrival of colour television. The colors on the "screen" border were modified and the gap between the colors became wider, along with the V going separate from the T and Chile.

On 1 April 1984, the logo was replaced with an "N" with Chilean flag color ribbons, before a modified version of the 1978 logo returned 3 years later. It first appeared on TVN's news programs in 1987. The modified logo featured a different shade of blue along the "screen" border, and Chile had a more condensed font. The 1984 design continued to be the secondary logo until January 1988. When TV Chile launched in 1989, it had the same logo as TVN. The design continued to be used until 1990, but between 11 March and 21 November, the borders of the "screen" were changed to rainbow, and the text Chile was light blue. Prior to this, the modified logo's red and blue stripes were also swapped.

The 1990 design, launched on 23 November 1990, ditched the "screen" with the TV typograph in black text, and Chile was replaced with a stripe of the Chilean colors. A modified version, launched on 2 June 1993, replaced the text color from black to grey, along with a more italicised look and a lighter blue colour stripe, and on 1 September 1996, it added the letter N, and the white stripe was removed, leaving only the blue and red stripes. The aforementioned stripes were also changed to be lighter.

A transitional logo, still keeping the 1996 logo, was introduced in late 2003. This would be the predecessor of the 2004 logo, as it featured the white TVN logo inside a red square.

On 4 January 2004, the 1996 design was replaced with the "red square" logo, featuring the TVN typograph inside a red square. A modified version was introduced on 9 August 2016, with rounded edges. Prior to its debut as its corporate logo, the "cuadrado rojo" (red square) was a symbol that debuted in September 1994, and since then, it began to be used progressively in the advertising and in 2001, it was used for the first time on-screen to show the content rating system. Since then, it began to draw attention, and in January 2004, it ended up becoming the corporate logo.

Since its release, the "red square" has influenced the logos and graphics of all brands of Televisión Nacional. In October 2020, the red square was removed, leaving just the TVN typograph in a red colour. However, it also featured a separate blue-coloured logo.

18 September 1969 - 5 February 1978

6 February 1978 - 31 March 1984

1 April 1984 - 1987 (primary), 1987 - January 1988 (secondary)

1987 - January 1988 (primary), January 1988 - 10 March 1990

23 November 1990 - 1 June 1993

2 June 1993 - 31 August 1996

1 September 1996 - 3 January 2004

4 January 2004 - 8 August 2016

9 August 2016 - 30 September 2020

1 October 2020 - present

== See also ==
- List of television stations in Chile
- Television in Chile
- Public broadcasting
