= 13i =

Chilean premium TV channel

13i (Canal 13 Internacional)
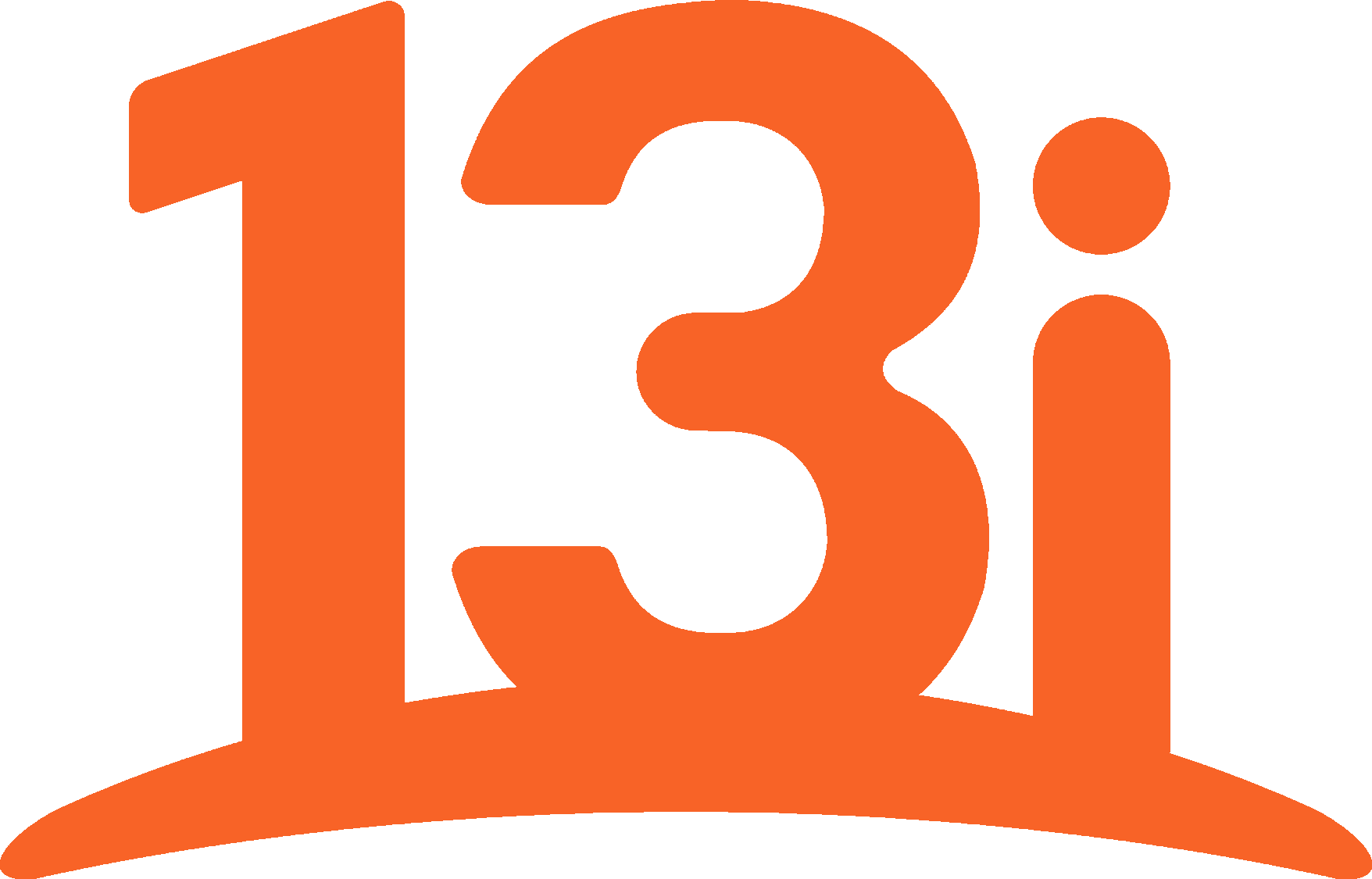
- Country: Chile
- Broadcast area: Worldwide
- Network: Canal 13
- Headquarters: Santiago

Programming
- Language: Spanish

Ownership
- Owner: Canal 13 SpA (Luksic Group)
- Key people: Cristian Bofill (executive director)

History
- Launched: June 5, 1995; 31 years ago (original; as UCTV Chile); June 30, 2014; 11 years ago (relaunch; as 13i)
- Closed: 2024
- Replaced by: 13 Internacional
- Former names: UCTV Chile (1995-1999); Canal 13 Chile (1999-2001)

Links
- Website: www.13i.tv

13i (or Canal 13 Internacional) was a Chilean pay television channel, that was launched as Canal 13's international broadcasting service.

== History ==
Its programming consists of direct live broadcasts from channel 13 of Santiago, with additional news bulletins and programmes especially produced for the international feed.

From 1995 until 2001, Canal 13 had an international channel, called UCTV Chile, which was rebranded as 13i on 30 June 2014, available as both a pay television channel and a subscription-based online livestream.

Despite efforts to carry the 13i signal, it was not possible to achieve the results expected by Canal 13, in addition to the lack of interest from foreign cable operators to incorporate the signal into their schedule, which led to the closure of the international signal and the website.

== Programming ==
- Teletrece AM
- Bienvenidos
- Teletrece Tarde
- La Reina de Franklin
- Teletrece
- Pacto de Sangre
- Contra Viento y Marea
- En su propia trampa
- Los 80
- Teletrece Noche
- Sábado de reportajes
- Vértigo
- Viva el lunes
- Martes 13
- Mediomundo
- Venga conmigo
- Papi Ricky
- Las Vega's
- Primera dama
- Si se la puede, gana
- Los clásicos del 13
- T13 Regional
