= Angelito de Canal 13 =

Chilean television mascot (1971–1999)

- The Angelito with the logo for Canal 13 from 1973 through 1999
- First appearance: February 1972
- Last appearance: 17 January 1999
- Created by: Enrique "Puma" Bustamante; Nelson Cuadros
- Designed by: Enrique "Puma" Bustamante

In-universe information
- Species: Angel
- Occupation: Mascot for Canal 13
- Religion: Catholic
- Nationality: Chilean

The Angelito de Canal 13 (transl. Little Angel of Channel 13) was the mascot of the Television Corporation of the Pontifical Catholic University of Chile, known as Canal 13.

== History ==
Enrique "Puma" Bustamante, one of the few animators in Chile during the early 1970s, designed the Angelito de Canal 13 in collaboration with Nelson Cuadros, a script writer, in 1971. Bustamante explained in a 1972 interview with La nación dominical that inspiration for the character came after he ordered his young children to bed in order to let him and Cuadros work. They were continually interrupted, however, by his youngest child, Christian. After repeatedly coming in and out of the living room where they were working, Christian finally went to sleep:

And, suddenly, [Bustamante] noticed the silence. It was at that moment when he said to his partner, "What's the little angel up to now?" ... No sooner had he finished the phrase when they both facepalmed their foreheads: the little angel, this was the character they were looking for.

The Angelito debuted in February 1972, and later it appeared on the network's national expansion campaign. Other angel characters were later added. An animated sequence with the angelitos was used as Canal 13's daily sign-on. It depicted a group of angelitos as the channel's behind-the-scenes staff, among whom a pink elephant emerged from a box to perform a dance. The sequence culminated with Sergio Silva announcing the beginning of the broadcast day over a recording of the Pontifical Catholic University of Chile's alma mater.

In 1975 and 1976, they were used to introduce the network's evening news program, Nuevo Teletrece.

Beginning on September 27, 1982, the angelitos became widely popular in a daily animated sequence entitled Hasta mañana, which signaled the end of Canal 13's children's-friendly programming and urged kids to go to bed.

As a result of the angelitos' popularity, Canal 13 was often informally referred to as "el canal del angelito" (transl. the little angel's channel), a term which persisted even after the network stopped using the characters and the Pontifical Catholic University of Chile relinquished its majority ownership.

The angelitos were retired in 1999 as part of Canal 13's efforts to remake its corporate image.
