= TV Bolívar =

- Country: Chile

Programming
- Language: Spanish

Ownership
- Owner: Antonio Jaén Buendía

History
- Launched: 18 October 1961; 65 years ago
- Closed: March 1962; 64 years ago

TV Bolívar was a Chilean television channel that existed in Concepción between October 1961 and March 1962, owned by Radio Simón Bolívar in the same city. It was the first private and commercial television station in the country, broadcasting via closed circuit via coaxial cable, being at the same time one of the first cable television systems operating in Chile.

== History ==
=== Background and training ===
The origins of TV Bolívar date back to September 1960, when the company Mercadotécnica y Gigante carried out closed circuit broadcasts in an approximate radius of 300 meters concentrated in the windows of various stores on Estado Street in Santiago. The head of the Television Department of the aforementioned company was Jorge Loyola Rivas, and the broadcasts were from 6:00 p.m. to 7:00 p.m. from the Radio Bulnes studios, located on the same State Street. In December of the same year, Loyola presented a Sylvania television team in Concepción and programs were made from the Radio Simón Bolívar auditorium.

After the experience of December 1960, Loyola was hired on February 28, 1961 by the owner of Radio Simón Bolívar de Concepción, Antonio Jaén Buendía, to install a television station in the city that would allow the future development of a commercial television project. The transmitting equipment was the same as the State Street experiment, complemented with two cameras and two Western Electric monitors — which arrived in Concepción in May — and two studios were also built by the architect Osvaldo Cáceres González, while Eduardo Gómez was appointed head of the technical section, Jorge Loyola in the artistic direction, and Alfredo Pacheco as head of the press. At the beginning of July, test broadcasts began, and at the same time Loyola held a course for 60 students in which it taught notions about making television programs.

=== Launch ===
TV Bolívar's broadcasts began at 7:00 p.m. on October 18, 1961, broadcasting two hours a day in closed circuit to approximately 8 to 18 televisions located in commercial houses and between 12 and 15 located in private homes, the latter paying a subscription fee of 30 escudos. The system could cover a radius of 5 kilometers from the transmitting station that was located on Exeter Street, as well as being able to broadcast in an open signal with a power of 1 kW. The reason for transmitting by cable was legal, since they were not subject to the control of the Directorate of Electrical Services, who only monitored open-signal transmissions. TV Bolívar hoped that, if over-the-air broadcasts were authorized, these could have reached towns such as Talcahuano, Tomé, Lota, and even Chillán.

Among its programming, modeled on the style of television stations in the United States, was a teletheater by Carmen "Chaty" Peláez (wife of Jorge Loyola), comments by journalist Hernán Osses of the newspaper Crónica, horoscope, interviews, contests and journalistic round tables. Some of the programs produced by TV Bolívar were: Your kitchen, lady, by Lucy de Muñoz; The weatherman with Guillermo Herrera, consisting of a meteorological report that included a board designed by Jorge Loyola in which through different drawings of the weather conditions (a sun, clouds and a tube that made water fall from the cloud, announcing rain) the forecast was presented on the screen; La fonda de Ña Pepa, a folklore music program by Huaso Puente; the newscast Telenoticias; and Sports on TV, made by Carlos Vergara Mancilla.

The TV Bolívar journalistic team was headed by Joaquín Aurelio Guzmán, and Liliana Astudillo, Annemarie Maack and Ariela Moedinger, from the School of Journalism at the University of Concepción, along with Sergio Gutiérrez, were also part of the channel's human team. and Manuel Troncoso (cameramen), Hugo Arévalo (production assistant), Manuel Ferreira (sound control), Elías Alarcón (operator cinema), Guillermo Rodríguez (video control), Rina Zurita and Carmen Peláez (studio directors), Francisco Jara (microphonist), Raúl Castro (lighting manager), Miguel Ferreira and Sergio Zambrano (pedestal lights), Ángel San Martín and Luis Hernández (cabrists), Patricio Manns (librettist), Enrique Bañados Muñoz (set designer), Eliel Medina (makeup) and Cristóbal Antequera (transpunte). The daily broadcasts had a duration of approximately 120 minutes.

=== Closure ===
One of its last transmissions, and at the same time one of the most relevant, occurred for the first Regional Fair of Bío-Bío (Ferbio), held from February 4 to 25, 1962. The artistic presentations carried out at said fair were transmitted by the channel to Radio Simón Bolívar and from there to the TV Bolívar studios on Exeter Street; The event generated extensive coverage in the local and national press, leading the authorities to close the station in March of that year. Economic and technical reasons have also been pointed out for said closure: the first would correspond to the high cost of transmissions and the low level of subscriptions in private homes (the subscription cost of 30 E° was equivalent to that of renting a house for a day, which at the time fluctuated between 30 and 40 E°) while the latter refer to the constant technical failures of the service and the difficulty in importing spare parts for the equipment.

After the closure of TV Bolívar, it would be 7 years until Concepción had television broadcasts again, this time originating from Santiago due to the arrival of Televisión Nacional de Chile to the city on September 18, 1969; A new partially local signal would emerge in February 1973 with the start of transmissions on Channel 5, associated with Canal 13.
