= Canal 13 Valparaíso =

- Country: Chile
- Network: Canal 13

Programming
- Language: Spanish
- Picture format: 1080i HDTV (downscaled to 480i for the SDTV feed)

Ownership
- Owner: Grupo Luksic

History
- Launched: 5 November 1976; 49 years ago
- Closed: 23 August 2019; 6 years ago
- Replaced by: Network signal of Canal 13 from Santiago

Links
- Website: www.13.cl

Availability

Terrestrial
- OTA: 8.1 (Valparaíso)

Canal 13 Valparaíso was the regional version of Canal 13 for the Valparaíso Region, Chile. His studios were located at Almirante Barroso 557, 22nd Floor, in the El Almendral neighborhood of the city of Valparaíso.

== History ==
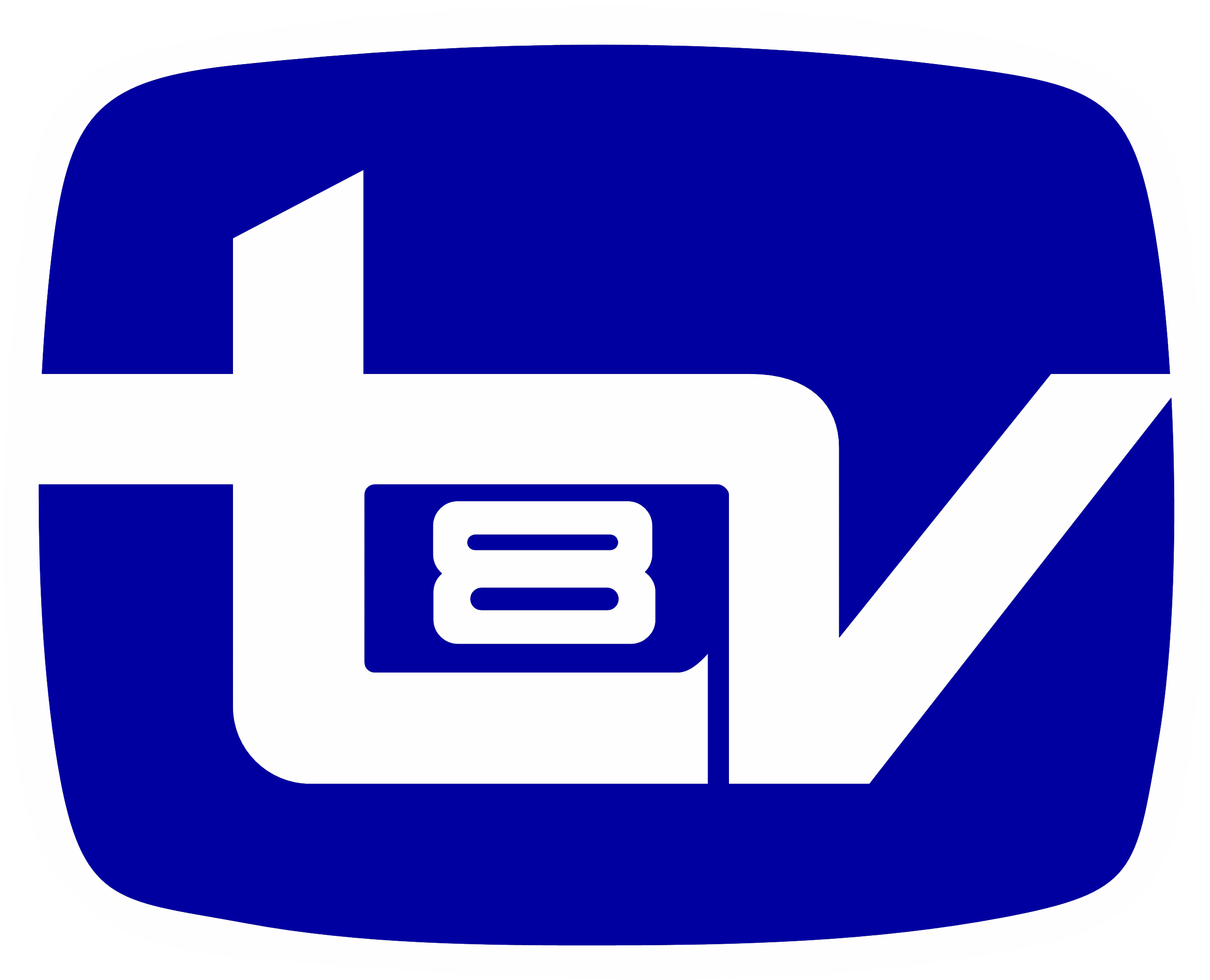
Logo as Canal 5, used between 1973 and 1996.

Transmissions began experimentally on November 5, 1976, when Channel 13 of Santiago installed a repeater antenna in the city of Valparaíso and began transmitting through channel 8, which until February 22, 1969 belonged to UCV Televisión (which moved to channel 4). In December of the same year, broadcasts began officially. For the arrival of the signal from Santiago, a microwave repeater was installed on La Dormida hill, from where the signal was redirected to the antenna installed in the Water sector. Santa Alto, in Viña del Mar.

It offered a local newscast and advertising in the national disconnections of Channel 13. It broadcast 15 minutes of news after Teletrece Tarde, and 20 to 25 minutes of news after Teletrece. Also during the broadcasts of the national editions of Teletrece, live links have also been made with the headquarters in Valparaíso, where the main information that occurred in the area is reviewed.

One of the milestones of Channel 13's local broadcasts for Valparaíso was the regional debate held on May 18, 2005 between the presidential candidates of the Coalition of Parties for Democracy, ahead of the coalition's primary elections. The event was broadcast by Channel 13 Valparaíso and TVN Red Valparaíso. This regional debate was the only one that was held, since later the candidate of the Christian Democratic Party, Soledad Alvear, withdrew her candidacy, giving her support to Michelle Bachelet, who would be elected in the second presidential round of 2006.

The end of broadcasts of the regional news program of Canal 13 Valparaíso - the last press center in the station's regions - occurred on August 23, 2019. The measure has to do with a new way of working in the press area, which seeks to enhance multiplatforms.

== Programs ==
- Teletrece Valparaíso
- El Tiempo (Región de Valparaíso)
- Teletrece Tarde Valparaíso

== Journalists ==
- Germán Gatica Bravo (Editor)
- Daniela Arancibia
- Francisco Acevedo
- Valeria Cabello
- Carlos Caucota
- Stephanie Zamora

== Directive ==
- Claudio Donoso: Head of Area
- Mauricio Vásquez: Director
- Mauricio Retamal: Assistant in Direction

== Cameramen ==
- Patricio Hernández
- Waldo Vergara
- Mauricio Sánchez
- Iván Guerrero
- Patricio Díaz
- Esteban Espinosa
- Leopoldo Moreno
- Juan Correa
