= Canal 13 Concepción =

- Country: Chile
- Network: Canal 13

Programming
- Language: Spanish
- Picture format: 1080i HDTV (downscaled to 480i for the SDTV feed)

Ownership
- Owner: Grupo Luksic

History
- Launched: 8 February 1973; 53 years ago(first phase); 10 August 2004; 21 years ago(second phase)
- Closed: 13 November 1996; 29 years ago(first phase); 10 May 2009; 17 years ago(second phase)
- Replaced by: Network signal of Canal 13 from Santiago

Links
- Website: www.13.cl

Availability

Terrestrial
- OTA: 5.1 (Concepción)

Canal 13 Concepción was a Chilean over-the-air television station affiliated with Canal 13 that broadcast exclusively to the cities of Concepción and Talcahuano. Since May 2019, only content has been generated for social networks and T13 Móvil. Its headquarters and studios were located at 509 Aníbal Pinto Street, 14th floor, in the city of Concepción, in the Biobío Region.

== History ==
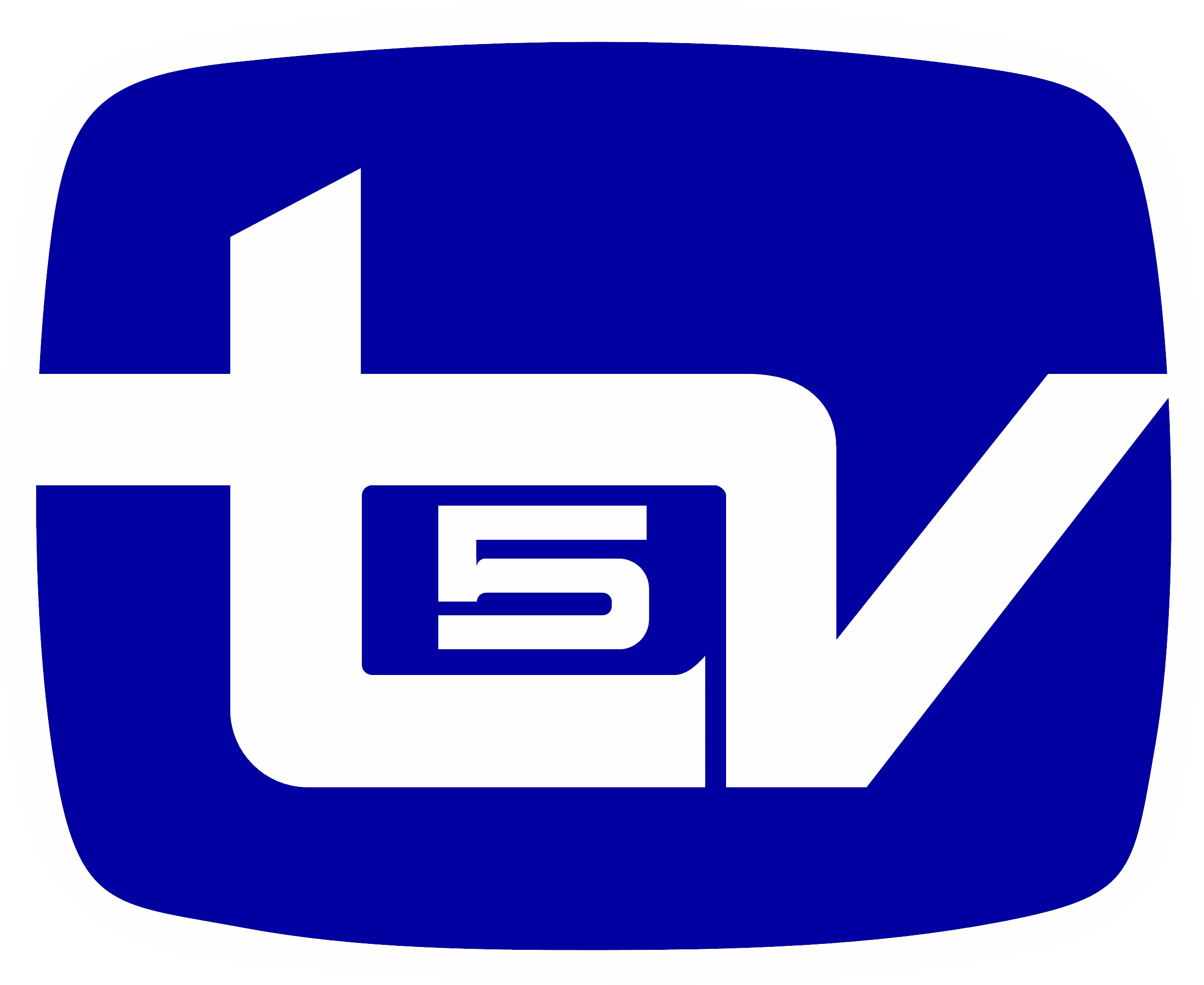
Logo as Canal 5, used between 1973 and 1996.

The arrival of Canal 13 in Concepción was achieved after an intense fundraising campaign carried out between 1972 and 1973, in order to install a repeater antenna in the city. The population had to acquire cooperation bonds in order to contribute money to the television station so that it could install the antenna.

The broadcasts officially began on February 8, 1973 - with a Road Runner cartoon being the first program shown - which the government of Salvador Allende considered illegal since at that time concessions were not granted to universities outside its jurisdiction and area of influence since they did not have the right according to the law to have national coverage; however, the channel was able to maintain itself due to the support of the citizens of Concepción and Talcahuano, as well as the National Television Council ruled on March 1 of that year that the extension of Channel 13 to other provinces was within the current legal framework. The studios of Channel 5 (as Channel 13 was known in the city) were located at the headquarters of the Archbishopric of Concepción, while the transmission plant was located at the Sports Palace of Talcahuano. On March 8, 1973, Sandra Garretón Pettinelli, the channel's first continuity announcer, debuted on screen.

During March 1973, Channel 5's signal suffered a series of interferences, resulting from an oscillometer and a wave meter installed in the Directorate of Electrical and Gas Services of Concepción, located on Freire Street. In the early morning of March 21, 1973, a group of the Nationalist Front Patria y Libertad led by Michael Townley entered the place, whereupon they were surprised by Jorge Henríquez González, who was gagged and finally died from strangulation. Subsequently, the judicial investigation would involve the priest Raúl Hasbún, then director of Channel 13, as the intellectual author of the action aimed at stealing the equipment and which resulted in the death of Jorge Henríquez.

On September 16, 1975, Canal 5 inaugurated a new 1,000-watt transmitter—manufactured in the United States—and a new 32-meter-high antenna, both installed on the Centinela Hill in Talcahuano, thereby expanding the range of its transmissions. The transmitter would later be replaced on December 16, 1982 by a new 5 kilowatt power device, manufactured in Japan.

In its beginnings and until the 1980s, Canal 5 transmitted the programming of Channel 13 of Santiago with a week of delay, among which were Sábados Gigantes, Noche de Gigantes, Almorzando en el trece, cartoons, series, movies, and national and Brazilian telenovelas. In 1982 it was decided to broadcast the aforementioned programs and the Teletarde news program live (via microwave) from Santiago, in addition to the sporting events that had already been broadcast live before. The rest of the programming such as soap operas (national and Brazilian), movies, series and the cultural slot on Thursdays continued to be broadcast on a delayed basis until the end of the decade when it was decided that the programming would be broadcast completely live from Santiago with the exception of Telecinco newscast, Teletiempo regional and local advertising rounds.

On July 30, 1986, Canal 5's headquarters moved to its own building - designed by architects Eduardo San Martín, Patricio Wenborne and Enrique Browne, who also designed the Canal 13 Television Center in Santiago, located in the intersection of Ongolmo and Las Heras streets, on a 1500 m² plot of land with 500 m² built, including a 90 m² studio, living room press, laboratory, workshops, control rooms, offices, casino, announcing parlor, and a generating set among others. At that time, the station had 23 permanent employees and 10 temporary ones.

During the years that Canal 5 lasted, its newscast stood out, called Telecinco, which was broadcast to replace Teletrece for the city of Concepción and the Province of Arauco where it was highly tuned in the area since they felt more identified and represented, which was why it was more watched than TVN news shows like 60 Minutos; what's more, after the newscast, the weather report called Teletiempo Regional was broadcast, which was sponsored by Lan Chile; and finally, during the first half of the 80s, after Telecinco, the Telebingo contest was broadcast, which was a microspace where the card numbers for the game of chance that were sold in the kiosks of the intercomuna and its surroundings were drawn daily. and it was organized by the Concepción Lions Club. Furthermore, when draws were held for the Concepción Lottery, the national signal of Channel 13 connected live (via microwave) to Channel 5 to report the results. The cities of Chillán and Los Ángeles received the entire signal from Canal 13 of Santiago.

The local signal of Channel 13 ceased its transmissions on November 13, 1996, and from that moment on it joined the network's national signal full time.

In August 2004, Canal 13 decided to reactivate its local signal in Concepción, broadcasting its new local newscast, this time titled Teletrece Concepción. Later, Canal 13 would open new local stations in the cities of Antofagasta, Valparaíso and Temuco. The Antofagasta and Temuco headquarters were closed in April 2009.

On July 30, 2014, the closure of Canal 13 Concepción was announced for August 29, however a series of protests and mobilizations by the Penquistas caused Canal 13 to reverse its decision and keep the regional signal on the air. However, Teletarde Concepción did not return to the air, leaving only the central edition.

Until May 2019, it offered a local newscast and advertising in the national disconnections of Channel 13. It broadcast 20 to 25 minutes of news after Teletrece.

During the broadcasts of the national editions of Teletrece, live links have also been made with the headquarters in Concepción, where the main information that occurred in the area is reviewed. In mid-May 2019, Channel 13 stopped broadcasting the Concepción news program on its open signal for the Biobío Region, also dismissing part of the staff who worked in the city, leaving only some professionals to produce content on its online channel (T13 Mobile).

== Programs ==
- Teletrece Concepción (news) (2004–2019)
- Teletarde Concepción (news) (2005–2014)
- El Tiempo Concepción (weather) (2005–2019)

=== Previous programs ===
- Buenas Tardes (talk show) (1974–1975)
- Campanil Universitario (cultural)
- El rincón del Tío Álvaro (children's)
- Réplica Concepción (debate) (2005)
- Telebingo (game show) (September 22, 1980-1987)
- Telecinco (news) (1973-November 1996)
- Teletiempo regional (weather) (1978–1994)

== Directors ==
- 1973-1975. Carlos de la Sotta Ibacache
- 1975-1990: Andrés Egaña Respaldiza
- 1990-1996: Ernesto Montalba Rencoret
