= Canal 13 (Chilean TV network) =

Chilean television network

- Country: Chile
- Broadcast area: Chile
- Headquarters: Santiago, Chile

Programming
- Language: Spanish
- Picture format: 1080i HDTV (downscaled to 16:9 480i for the SDTV feed)

Ownership
- Owner: Canal 13 SpA; Grupo Luksic (through TV Medios Investments Ltd.)
- Sister channels: T13 en vivo 13 Internacional; 13C; 13Rec

History
- Launched: August 21, 1959
- Former names: Canal 2 UC (1959–1961); Canal 13 UC (1961–1970); Corporación de Televisión de la Universidad Católica de Chile (1970–1982); Universidad Católica de Chile Televisión (1982–1999); Corporación de Televisión de la Pontificia Universidad Católica de Chile (secondary, 2000–2002)

Links
- Website: www.13.cl

Availability

Terrestrial
- Digital UHF: Listings may vary

Canal 13 is a Chilean free-to-air television network. Informally known in Chile as El 13 (The Thirteen), it is the second oldest television station in the country. Launched on August 21, 1959, on VHF channel 2 in Santiago, it was founded by a group of engineers from the Pontifical Catholic University of Chile. The station later moved its frequency to VHF channel 13, which gave rise to its current name. One of its most significant milestones was broadcasting the 1962 FIFA World Cup, hosted in Chile.

It was originally named Corporación de Televisión de la Pontificia Universidad Católica de Chile (Television Corporation of the Pontifical Catholic University of Chile) until 2010, when the university sold most of its shares to Andrónico Luksic Craig's Grupo Luksic. In 2017, Grupo Luksic acquired full ownership of the channel.

Its central studios are located in the Eleodoro Rodríguez Matte Television Centre, which has housed the channel's production and broadcast facilities since the 1980s. The complex is situated in Providencia, Santiago Metropolitan Region, and covers 5 hectares. Since 1998, the facility has been named after the station's deceased executive director, Eleodoro Rodríguez Matte, who was one of the longest-serving individuals in that position.

== History ==
=== 1952-1973: Experimental tests and early years of the channel ===
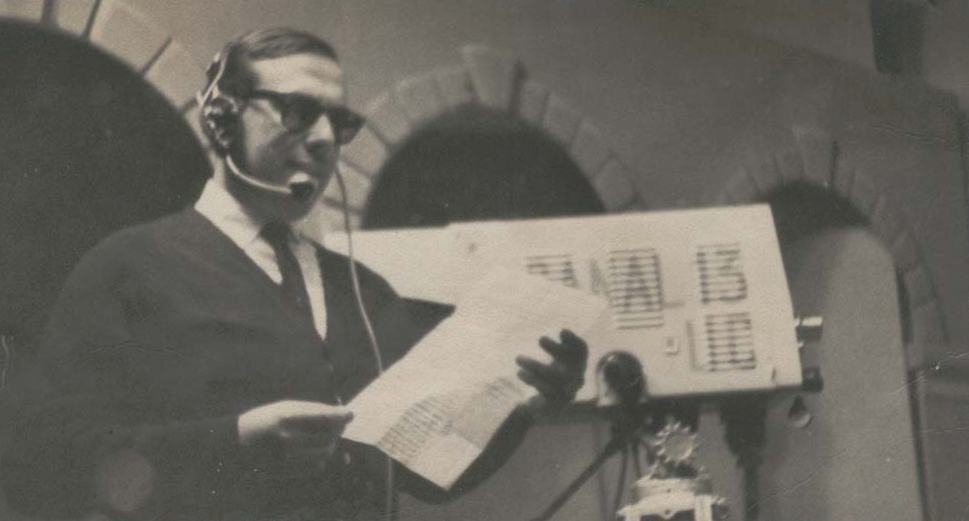
David Raisman at studio A of Canal 13 (1965).

On November 25, 1952, the first RCA Victor brand industrial television equipment was received in Santiago, Chile. It was acquired by the Catholic University in association with the Chilean subsidiary of the North American firm. Two teams were immediately established at the university to oversee the use of the system: a technical team led by engineer Julio del Río and an artistic team directed by Germán Becker. On December 12 of that year, the first experimental program was broadcast in a closed circuit from the Auditorium of the School of Physics at the Catholic University. The broadcast, though marked by several technical errors, was considered a success. In January 1953, the university's television department collaborated with Radio Minería for a special broadcast of its program La Cadena de la Amistad, marking the first public television broadcast in Chile.

In 1959, Pedro Caraball was appointed head of the Electronics Department. At the same time, a 100 W audio transmitter was built and new Philips industrial equipment was purchased, leading to the first test transmissions on July 17. On August 21 of that year, at 7:00 p.m., experimental transmissions formally began from an attic on the fourth floor of the Central House, with a receiver installed in the reception of El Diario Ilustrado. These transmissions used VHF channel 2 and featured a schedule of three films weekly - this being marked today as the official birthday of the television network. The broadcasts were interrupted on December 31 due to an accident that affected the transmitter. In January 1960, the Television Department was established, and Juan Ángel Torti was appointed as its director to officially organize the station.

The test transmissions ended on Saturday, April 15, 1961, at 6:00 p.m., when the Catholic University’s television station began its official broadcasts this time in a new frequency - UHF channel 13, upon which it earned its long time nickname of Channel 13 (Canal 13). Since April 3 of the same year, test broadcasts had been conducted from 6:00 p.m. to 8:00 p.m. to adjust the broadcasting equipment. A studio was built in the University's Central House, from which Recuerdos de la Pérgola de las Flores, the channel's first program, was broadcast. Additionally, El Show de Antonio Prieto and Tricotilandia, the first entertainment programs on Chilean television, were produced in the same studio. These programs were also the first to introduce commercial advertising to Chilean television.

In 1962, now definitively using channel 13, the station successfully broadcast the 1962 FIFA World Cup, which took place in Chile. This achievement was made possible by new equipment, including five cameras, a transmitter, and a link team, which had been received on March 29 of that year. Canal 13 was responsible for broadcasting the matches between Chile and Italy, Germany and Switzerland, as well as the quarter-finals, semi-finals, and the final of the championship. After the World Cup, the channel ceased broadcasts for nearly a month to make technical adjustments, resuming on Sunday, July 22, with the broadcast of the first part of La Pérgola de las Flores, which was divided into four parts aired every Sunday. That day also featured performances by the musical groups The Dreamers, The Strangers, and María Teresa Larraín.

In August of that year, Show Dominical began to air. In 1965, it moved to Saturdays as Sábados Alegres, and later, with its extended length, was renamed Sábados Gigantes. This became the oldest and most successful variety program in Latin America, hosted by Mario Kreutzberger, better known as Don Francisco. On October 2, 1962, the channel's studios were officially inaugurated in a ceremony led by Darío Aliaga, Eduardo Tironi, and Cardinal Raúl Silva Henríquez.

In 1963, the first Press Department of Chilean television was established, directed by journalist Leonardo Cáceres. That same year, the channel's drama division was created under the direction of Hugo Miller. The teletheater The Greenhouse (1963) debuted, starring Malú Gatica, who was returning to the country after her time in Hollywood, and marked the debut of Sonia Viveros. The following year,This Is My Family, Chile's first ever TV drama, began broadcasting, starring Malú Gatica in the lead role.

In 1964, Channel 13 started broadcasting seven days a week and covered the presidential elections on September 4, where Eduardo Frei Montalva was elected president. On April 1, 1965, the series El Liter 4916 premiered with great success. Meanwhile, The Secret History of the Big News became the first documentary program on Chilean television. On December 27 of that same year, the channel introduced the videotape system by recording the teletheater The Browning Version with newly received equipment, launched with the help of Argentine technicians. Four days later, at 11:45 p.m. on December 31, 1965, the channel broadcast its first program recorded on videotape: a musical presentation by Marianela and Los Gatos, along with a greeting from Eduardo Tironi, the station director.

In 1967, the channel achieved another success with the comedy Juani en Society, starring Sonia Viveros and Silvia Piñeiro. In October of that year, it received new mobile transmission equipment, including a videotape system, which enabled the recording of outdoor scenes. On August 9, 1968, the channel received its first satellite transmission, corresponding to a live broadcast from the Chilean Embassy in Washington D.C., to mark the inauguration of the Longovilo earth station. On July 20 and 21, 1969, it covered the transmission of man's arrival on the Moon via satellite in conjunction with Channel 9 and National Television of Chile, the latter still in experimental transmissions.

On March 1, 1970, the Teletrece news program debuted, becoming the oldest news program on Chilean television still on air. In 1971, the channel became an associate member of the European Broadcasting Union. In 1972, Angelito de Canal 13, the first mascot of Channel 13 created by Enrique Bustamante, was introduced, and priest Raúl Hasbún took over as the channel's new director.

On December 24, 1972, the channel expanded its transmissions to the cities of San Fernando and Curicó on frequency 5, known in both cities as "Canal 5," officially beginning broadcasts on January 3, 1973. On February 8, 1973, Channel 5, a subsidiary station of Channel 13 in Concepción, also began broadcasting. The legislation in effect at that time (from 1970) did not account for the geographical expansion of university channels, leading to significant controversy. Channel 13's campaign for national coverage was contentious, particularly due to its editorial stance opposing the then-current government, in stark contrast to National Television of Chile and Channel 9 of the University of Chile.

On September 11, 1973—the day of the coup d'état against the government of Salvador Allende—Channel 13 was the only television outlet authorized to broadcast by order of the Military Government Junta. For three days, Channel 13 used TVN's frequency network, as TVN and Channel 9 were off the air.

=== 1974-1999: New television center and expansion ===
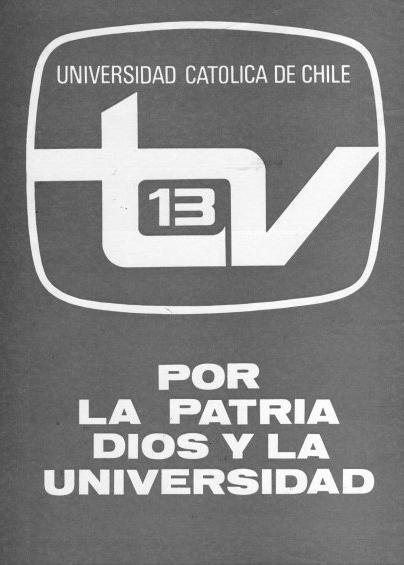
Advertisement from Channel 13 in 1971 featuring the slogan used at the time, "For the country, God and the university".

In 1974, due to issues with the new rector of the Catholic University, Jorge Swett Madge—appointed by the Military Junta—Raúl Hasbún resigned from his position. Eleodoro Rodríguez Matte succeeded him to continue the channel's national expansion - the three days of nationwide broadcasts in 1973 left a positive impression that people wanted more Channel 13 programming to be aired nationwide. Programming increased, and starting in March of that year, the channel began its daily broadcasts at 9:00 a.m. and continued until 1:00 a.m. It also retransmitted its programs on a delayed basis to La Serena and Coquimbo after signing an agreement with UCV Televisión's Channel 8 in 1975. Under Matte, Teletrece, armed with the experience of the 1973 nationwide simulcast, asserted its place as the nation's no.1 newscast, a distinction it retained into the 1990s.

In 1976, the channel broadcast the Chilean team's matches in the Davis Cup and the playoff match of the Copa Libertadores final between Cruzeiro and River Plate at the National Stadium as a simulcast with TVN. At the same time it also extended its broadcast signal to other parts of Chile, inaugurating a repeater in Valparaíso and Viña del Mar in November 1976 on channel 8, a frequency previously held by UCV Televisión until February 1969. In December 1976, the channel signed an affilation agreement with the Universidad del Norte Television Network, allowing it to air Channel 13 programming in Northern Chile - this meant that Antofagasta, Arica, Calama, Chuquicamata, Iquique, María Elena, and Tocopilla received these TV programs for the first time since September of 1973.

In 1975, the Treasury ended the subsidies it had periodically granted to university television stations since their inception. Consequently, Canal 13 began to finance itself solely through advertising and contributions from the Catholic University. However, advertising revenues soon allowed the channel to operate as a commercial station and generate additional profits. This new direction was symbolized by programs created by director Gonzalo Bertrán and presenter César Antonio Santis, who returned to the channel from a stinct in National Television in 1976 as weekday presenter of the hit evening newscast Teletrece, a role he performed until returning to TVN in 1988. The duo first produced musical specials featuring foreign artists for the Channel 13 network and later created two-hour variety shows, starting with Esta noche fiesta which premiered in 1977.

On April 12, 1978, color television transmissions were authorized in Chile, establishing the American NTSC standard as official. Canal 13 adapted quickly, acquiring four RCA TK-760 cameras and a TK-28 equipment within three months. By June, the channel, along with National Television, broadcast the Soccer World Cup from Argentina - the first major sports event to be aired using the then new color TV technologies, using feed from Argentina Televisora Color (today Television Publica).

On December 2 of that year, Canal 13, TVN, and the channels of the University of Chile and the Pontificia Universidad Católica de Valparaíso organized and broadcast the 1978 OTI Song Festival at the Municipal Theater of Santiago. Additionally, on December 8 and 9, a second collaboration project of these channels led to the historic broadcast of the first Teletón, with Channel 13's Don Francisco as lead presenter, a role he would be connected in the years to come.

In 1981, the soap operas La Madrastra and Casagrande and the news programs Teletarde and Telenoche premiered. Following this, the channel's production increased, and on May 15, 1983, it inaugurated its Television Center in Providencia, moving from the studios on Lira Street. Studio D at the former location, where La Madrastra was being produced, had suffered a fire on July 20, 1981 during taping. One of the first programs produced in the new studios was the variety show Martes 13, which launched live from Studio 3 on July 7, 1983. Additionally, Canal 13 continued to expand, premiering its signal in Talca on August 21, 1984, through channel 8, and extending to Chillán and Los Angeles through channel 13 on December 18. At the same time as the opening of the Talca station, the Channel 13 network signed on for an additional affilation agreement with rival TVN, wherein programming on its Channel 7 station in Easter Island would be supplemented by videotaped broadcasts of select network productions and delayed airings of sports events.

On March 3, 1985, Channel 13 extended the edition of Teletrece until around 1 a.m. to cover the aftermath of that day's earthquake in Algarrobo. Additionally, on March 8 and 9, the channel organized the first edition of the Chile ayuda a Chile campaign to gather aid for earthquake victims, with a broadcast that lasted more than 30 hours. On September 6 of that year, it began broadcasting in Constitución through channel 9. In 1986, in collaboration with National Television, it broadcast the Davis Cup match involving the Chilean team and premiered the telenovela Ángel Malo, an adaptation of a Brazilian telenovela from 1975, during the first half of the year. The channel also broadcast Secreto de Familia in the second half of the year. Canal 13 continued its expansion by reaching Cauquenes (channel 7) and Temuco (channel 4), with transmissions in Temuco beginning on July 18. In June, it broadcast the 1986 FIFA World Cup from Mexico with TVN, and on July 30, it inaugurated Channel 5's studios in Concepción, modeled after the Providencia Television Center.

In 1987, Channel 13 expanded its reach to several cities: Puerto Montt (channel 13), Osorno (channel 9, starting October 28), Angol (channel 10), San Felipe, Lebu, Lautaro, Traiguén, and Saladillo. From April 1 to 5, it broadcast Pope John Paul II's visit to Chile live as the official channel, at the request of the Chilean episcopate, and was the only station to cover the entire event. Additionally, on August 7 and 8, Sábados Gigantes celebrated its 25th anniversary with a 25-hour special program. Finally, from October 10 to 25, it co-broadcast the U-20 Soccer World Cup held in Chile that year with National Television. In addition, the comedy show De chincol a jote premiered that year.

During 1990, Universidad Católica de Chile Televisión achieved national coverage, reaching from Arica (channel 8) to Quellón (channel 5). On May 29, 1991, the channel, along with Televisión Nacional de Chile, broadcast the final match of the 1991 Copa Libertadores, achieving high ratings for both channels. The broadcast was presented by Pedro Carcuro, Ignacio Hernández (for TVN), and Alberto Fouillioux (for Channel 13). On June 5, both channels broadcast the second leg of the 1991 Copa Libertadores final, again with high ratings for both stations. This broadcast was directed by Gonzalo Bertrán and presented by Pedro Carcuro, Sergio Livingstone (for TVN), Alberto Fouillioux, and Julio Martínez (for Channel 13). Additionally, on June 28, the channel added the American series The Simpsons to its schedule, which became a long-standing and iconic program on Channel 13. Coverage continued to expand in 1991, reaching Vallenar, Rancagua, and Punta Arenas. At the beginning of 1992, the channel began broadcasting in the communes of Petorca and Illapel. In Punta Arenas, the signal began transmitting on May 15, 1991, with 6 hours of programming initially, which was gradually extended. This system remained in place until April 1993, when it was replaced by live satellite signals from Santiago.

On March 16, 1992, the press department underwent a restructuring, with Eduardo Riveros taking over at Teletarde. As a result, Jeanette Frazier and the announcer Augusto Gatica left the news reading roles. Gatica then became the official voice-over of the channel, along with Christian Gordon, until August 1997. Additionally, on December 26, Sábado Gigante was broadcast for the last time from Santiago; the program subsequently moved to the Univision network in the United States. The soap operas Marrón Glacé and Doble Juego were also released. Furthermore, Channel 13 achieved definitive national coverage with its arrival in the Aysén Region.

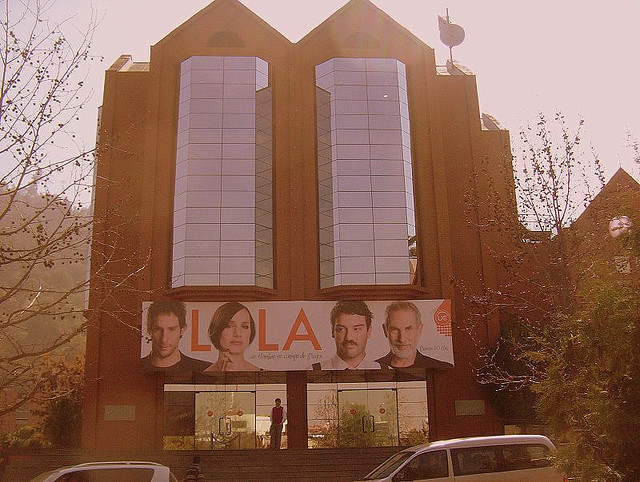
The Canal 13 Television Center, built between 1983 and 1994, located in the commune of Providencia, Santiago.

In December 1994, the final stage of the Television Center was inaugurated with the presence of President Eduardo Frei Ruiz-Tagle and Eleodoro Rodríguez Matte. The center became the television channel with the largest infrastructure area in the country at that time, covering 30,000 square meters. That same year, Punta Arenas began to be broadcast in Compressed Digital Image format via satellite from the channel's Press Department. On May 1, 1995, the press department underwent a renewal, with Javier Miranda taking over Teletrece, Eduardo Riveros heading Teletarde, and Jorge Díaz Saenger or Loreto Delpin in Telenoche. On July 25, Martes 13 was broadcast for the last time, and on October 16, Viva el Lunes premiered. In terms of sports, the channel broadcast last season's Copa Interamericana final from the Estadio San Carlos de Apoquindo.

In 1996, the channel broadcast the Chilean team's matches in the Davis Cup, a trend that continued in 1997 and 1998. Additionally, in February of that year, it extended its signal to Coyhaique on channel 6. However, on November 13, Channel 13 ended local production in Concepción after 23 years due to economic issues, converting Channel 5 into a full-time repeater of programming from Santiago. On April 24, Channel 13 broadcast the Qualifiers for France '98, covering the Chilean soccer team's away matches against Venezuela, Argentina, and Ecuador. In 1997, the channel began broadcasting 24 hours a day on weekends and premiered telenovelas such as Adrenalina, Playa Salvaje, Marparaíso, and Fuera de Control.

In 1998, Channel 13 was awarded the broadcast rights to the Copa Libertadores de América, which had previously belonged to Megavisión. The channel also acquired the children’s program Cachureos, which had previously been broadcast on Televisión Nacional and had four seasons on Channel 13. Additionally, in July, the channel broadcast the Chilean team's Davis Cup match against Colombia for the last time. On July 18, Eleodoro Rodríguez Matte, the director of the television station since 1974, passed away. Rodrigo Jordán succeeded him as director on August 6.

=== 1999-2009: Editorial and programming changes ===
In 1999, Channel 13 began broadcasting on the Internet through its website canal13.cl and aired the religious microprogram Reflexiones for the last time. On June 18, the channel updated its corporate image, retiring its classic logo and mascot.

=== 2010-2017: Operation under Grupo Luksic and the Catholic University ===
In January 2010, following a crisis caused by low ratings and the failure of several programs, several key figures at the channel resigned, including Executive Director Mercedes Ducci, Press Director Pilar Bernstein, and General Manager Sergio Cavagnaro. After Ducci's resignation, Jorge Herrera, the president of the Corporation's Advisory Council, assumed the role of executive director on an interim basis. In April, the new rector of the Pontifical Catholic University of Chile, Ignacio Sánchez, appointed Marcelo von Chrismar Werth as the new Executive Director. In June, Patricio Hernández was reinstated as Director of Programming, and journalist Eliana Rozas was appointed as Director of Press. Additionally, Deportes 13 and the reporting area were made directly dependent on the Press Department, ceasing to be autonomous areas of the channel. This restructuring occurred amid a climate of crisis within the channel due to low viewership, increased financial losses, and the failure of many new programs. There were also early signs of stagnation in advertising investments, attributed to competition from the Internet.

== Other services ==
Channel 13 also controls three sister channels, four radio stations through 13 Radios (see the section below), and two free online streaming services.

=== Sister channels ===
- 13C: Formerly known as "Canal 13 Cable," it focuses its programming on cultural-themed series.
- Canal 13 HD: Launched in 2009, it was the country's first HD channel and one of its kind in Latin America. It is currently treated as Channel 13's main feed, airing most of its content in high definition.
- 13Rec: Channel 13's cable network that broadcasts older programs formerly known as Rec TV. It is available through cable TV and online.
- T13 en vivo: Teletrece's news channel formerly known as T13 Móvil and 13.2, available online. It is also broadcast on Channel 8.2.

=== Regional networks ===
Channel 13 once had regional stations that broadcast local news. However, as the primary signal began reaching those regions, the regional stations were gradually closed.

- Canal 13 Valparaíso: Channel 13's television affiliate in the Valparaíso Region, which closed in 2019.
- Canal 13 Concepción: Channel 13's television affiliate in the Bío Bío Region. It operated from 1973 to 1996 and was relaunched in 2004 until its closure in 2019.
- Canal 13 Antofagasta: Channel 13's television affiliate in the Antofagasta Region, which operated from 2004 to 2009. It initially replaced Channel 13's affiliation with the local TV station Telenorte in 1989, when a relay station was set up.
- Canal 13 Temuco: Channel 13's television affiliate in the Araucanía Region. It closed in 2009, alongside Canal 13 Antofagasta.

=== Online services ===
- 13Go: Channel 13's TV streaming service offers a variety of content, including past programs produced by the station. It is available online and on Samsung Smart TVs sold locally since 2016. The service was launched in 2017 as Loop 13 but was renamed 13Now in 2019 and was renamed again 13Go in 2021.
- Emisor Podcasting: Channel 13's podcasting service offers a catalog of various podcasts created by 13 Radio's program hosts. Available online since 2019, it also has a mobile app for both iOS and Android.

== 13 Radios ==
Channel 13 also has a radio brand called 13 Radios, founded in 2013. It includes the following four stations:

- Oasis FM: A radio station purchased by Channel 13, available only in Santiago and the southern half of the country. It airs programming designed for young adults and is accessible nationwide via Cable TV on VTR's Channel 654.
- Play FM: A radio station that primarily airs English-language mainstream pop music, with occasional Spanish-language tracks. It broadcasts on the 100.9 FM band in Santiago and features programming focused on Pop, Rock, Soul, Blues, and R&B music styles.
- Sonar FM: A local radio station that exclusively broadcasts Rock and Hard rock music. It is only available in Santiago and features programming centered around the Rock genre.
- Tele13 Radio: A local news radio station that is part of the channel's News Department. Its name is derived from Channel 13's newscast, Teletrece (often abbreviated to Tele13). It began operations on April 21, 2015, replacing Top FM.

=== Previous stations ===
- Radio Horizonte: A former radio station on the 103.3 FM dial, launched in 1985 and acquired by Channel 13 in 2012. Its programming focused on Indie and Electronic music. It was replaced by Top FM (now Tele13 Radio) on March 19, 2013, but continued online until May 2017. It returned via the internet on March 31, 2021.
- Top FM: A former radio station owned by Channel 13, with programming designed for adults aged 17 to 45. It replaced Radio Horizonte on the 103.3 FM dial but ceased regular broadcasts on April 20, 2015, with Tele13 Radio taking over the following day. Like Horizonte, Top FM remained available online until May 2017.

== Digital terrestrial television ==
Virtual Channel	Actual Frequency	Programming	Transmission Zone (Regional Capitals)	Aspect	Resolution
13.1	24 UHF	Canal 13	Santiago	16:9	1080i
13.2	24 UHF	T13 en vivo	Santiago	16:9	1080i
8.1	24 UHF	Canal 13	Arica	16:9	1080i
8.2	24 UHF	T13 En Vivo	Arica	16:9	1080i
8.1	24 UHF	Canal 13	Iquique	16:9	1080i
8.2	24 UHF	T13 en Vivo	Iquique	16:9	1080i
13.1	24 UHF	Canal 13	Antofagasta	16:9	1080i
13.2	24 UHF	T13 en Vivo	Antofagasta	16:9	1080i
11.1	24 UHF	Canal 13	Copiapo	16:9	1080i
11.2	24 UHF	T13 En Vivo	Copiapo	16:9	1080i
13.1	24 UHF	Canal 13	La Serena	16:9	1080i
13.2	24 UHF	T13 en Vivo	La Serena	16:9	1080i
8.1	24 UHF	Canal 13	Valparaíso	16:9	1080i
8.2	24 UHF	T13 en Vivo	Valparaíso	16:9	1080i
8.1	25 UHF	Canal 13	Rancagua	16:9	1080i
8.2	25 UHF	T13 En Vivo	Rancagua	16:9	1080i
8.1	29 UHF	Canal 13	Talca	16:9	1080i
8.2	29 UHF	T13 en Vivo	Talca	16:9	1080i
13.1	29 UHF	Canal 13	Chillan	16:9	1080i
13.2	29 UHF	T13 en Vivo	Chillan	16:9	1080i
5.1	24 UHF	Canal 13	Concepción	16:9	1080i
5.2	24 UHF	T13 En Vivo	Concepción	16:9	1080i
4.1	36 UHF	Canal 13	Temuco	16:9	1080i
4.2	36 UHF	T13 En Vivo	Temuco	16:9	1080i
12.1	24 UHF	Canal 13	Valdivia	16:9	1080i
12.2	24 UHF	T13 en Vivo	Valdivia	16:9	1080i
13.1	24 UHF	Canal 13	Puerto montt	16:9	1080i
13.2	24 UHF	T13 en Vivo	Puerto montt	16:9	1080i
13.1	24 UHF	Canal 13	Coyhaique	16:9	1080i
13.2	24 UHF	T13 En Vivo	Coyhaique	16:9	1080i
9.1	28 UHF	Canal 13	Punta Arenas	16:9	1080i
9.2	28 UHF	T13 en Vivo	Punta Arenas	16:9	1080i

== Visual identity ==
=== Logo history ===
First logo (1961–1969): Note that color TV did not yet exist in Chile, so the blue rectangles were black on-air.

1969-1970

1970-1973

1973-1978

1978-1979: When color TV began testing in Chile, a sky blue background was used during this period. This was implemented for the 1978 and 1979 Teletón, marking the first time a special event was broadcast in color in Chile.

1979–1999

1999–2000

2000–2002

2002–2005

2005–2010

November 1, 2010 – March 22, 2018: A variant of the previous logo, but without the "UC" text.

March 23, 2018 - April 14, 2025

Current logo, in use since April 15, 2025.

=== Slogan history ===
Period	Slogan
1959–1961	Transmite, Canal 2 de la Universidad Católica de Chile (Channel 2 broadcasting from the Catholic University of Chile)
1961–1963	Transmite, Canal 13 de la Universidad Católica de Chile (Channel 13 broadcasting from the Catholic University of Chile)
1968–1973	Por la patria, dios y la Universidad (For the fatherland, God, and the university)
1978	Bienvenido al mundo del color (Welcome to the world of color!)
1979-1982	Universidad Católica de Chile Televisión
1980	¡El canal con todo! (The channel with everything!)
1984–1997	Esta es Universidad Católica de Chile Television (This is Catholic University of Chile Television.)
1988–1992	En sus hogares, Universidad Católica de Chile Television (In your households, Catholic University of Chile Television.)
1992–1999	Transmite Universidad Católica de Chile Television (Broadcasting Catholic University of Chile Television.)
1996–1999	Su canal de Siempre (Your same old channel)
1999–2000	Siga la señal del 13 (Follow the signal from 13)
2000–2002	Transmite/Esta es/Con usted, Corporación de Televisión de la Pontificia Universidad Católica de Chile, Canal 13. (Broadcasting/This is/With you Television Corporation of the Pontifical Catholic University of Chile, Channel 13)
2002–2005; 2023–present	Está bueno el 13 (13 is so good)
2005–2009	Nos vemos en el 13 (We'll see you at 13)
2009–2010	Todo lo bueno suma 13 (Everything good adds up to 13)
2010	El 13 en tu vida siempre (The 13 in your life always)
2010	Ahora es Cuando (Now is the time)
2011	Prendete con el 13 (Turn yourself on with 13)
2012–present	Por el 13 (On 13)
2018–2020	Estamos aquí para compartir por el 13 (We're here to share on 13)
2020–2023	Estamos por ti (We are here for you)
2025	En sintonía con tu vida (In tune with your life)

== Programming ==
=== Teletrece editions ===
Main Programs
Edition	Date(s)	Main Host(s)	Some Weekend Host(s)	Sports Commentator(s)	Schedule on programming
Teletrece Central (main, evening)	1970 – Present	Ramón Ulloa; Soledad Onetto (Mondays to Thursdays) Alfonso Concha; Cristina González (Fridays)	Beatriz Apud; Andrea Pino; Nilse Silva	Juan Cristobal Guarello; Ignacio Valenzuela	Every day, starting at 8:45 PM and ending at 10:10 PM.
Teletrece AM (morning)	1998 – Present	Natalia López; Francesco Gazzella	None	Luis Marambio	Every Weekday, starting at 6:00 AM and ending at 8:00 AM.
Teletrece Tarde (afternoon)	1970 – Present	Monica Pérez; Iván Valenzuela (Mondays to Thursdays); Cristián Pino (Fridays)	Beatriz Apud; Andrea Pino; Nilse Silva	Luis Marambio; Pablo Gómez	Every day, starting at 1:00 PM and ending at 2:30 PM.
Teletrece Noche (midnight)	1972-2019; since 2021	Álvaro Paci	None	None	Mondays to Thursdays, starting at 2:30 AM and ending at 3:30 AM.
Avance de Teletrece (news bullets)	Sporadically broadcast	Varies depending on hour		None	Usually, it is broadcast when certain hours (like 7:00 PM) begin. On Sundays, it is broadcast before program Mesa Central.

Other Programs
Edition	Date(s)	Schedule	Notes
Informate en un 3x3	2005-2020; since 2021	Weekdays at 6:00 AM	3x3 stopped being broadcast on 2020 due to COVID-19 restrictions. It returned first for the 2020 plebiscite for a new constitution (as part of Canal 13's special programming), and then returned definitely in 2021, this time linked to T13.
Mesa Central	Since 2018	Sundays at 10:45 AM	This program is also broadcast on Tele13 Radio on Weekdays (in fact, the program was born on that radio station). Hosted by Ivan Valenzuela.
Sin despertador T13	Since 2020	Saturdays at 9:00 AM	It originally was broadcast on weekdays at 8:30 PM and initially named T13 Ciudadanos. Hosted by Natalia Lopez.
Teletrece C	1995-2014	Various Schedules	This was a version exclusive to cable TV channel 13C. After that version ended, a simulcast of regular T13 was broadcast on 13C.

=== Current own programming ===
Name	Type	Date	Seasons	Notes
Tu Día	Breakfast TV	Since 2021	1 (as of 2022)	
Lugares que hablan	Travel documentary	Since 2012	10	
De tú a tú	Talk Show	Since 2021	2	
¡Qué dice Chile!	Game Show	Since 2021	2 (as of 2022)	Local variant of Family Feud, distributed by Fremantle

== See also ==
- Angelito de Canal 13, former mascot of Canal 13
