= UChile TV =

Chilean television channel

- Country: Chile
- Broadcast area: Chile
- Headquarters: Santiago, Chile

Programming
- Language: Spanish
- Picture format: 1080i HDTV (downscaled to 480i for the SDTV feed)

Ownership
- Owner: University of Chile

History
- Launched: 30 December 2020; 5 years ago

Links
- Website: uchiletv.cl

Availability

Terrestrial
- Digital VHF: x.2 of the Chilevisión multiplex; listings may vary

UChile TV is a Chilean over-the-air television network owned by the University of Chile. It opened on 30 December 2020. The channel is available on the second subchannel of the Chilevisión multiplex, whose frequencies are spread across most of the country.

== History ==
The University of Chile is in charge of Chilevisión's licenses in Santiago and 27 other locations (Valparaíso, San Antonio, Rancagua, San Fernando, Talca, Chillán, Concepción, Talcahuano, Temuco, Valdivia, Osorno, Puerto Montt, Arica, Iquique, Antofagasta, El Salvador, Chuquicamata, Copiapó, Vallenar, La Serena, Ovalle, Illapel, Los Vilos, San Felipe and Los Andes, Ancud, Castro, Coyhaique and Punta Arenas). In 1993, rector Jaime Lavados granted the usufruct of these licences to Red de Televisión Universitaria S.A for a 25-year period, automatically renewable for another similar period. Shortly after, RTU was sold that same year to Organización Cisneros, who renamed the controlling company to Chilevisión S.A.

In mid-2018, at the end of the first 25-year period, the University of Chile asked the National Television Council (CNTV) to extend the usufruct of the VHF license for analog transmissions for the necessary period to conclude the migration process from analog to digital terrestrial television, according to what was established in Law N° 20.750.

For over twenty years, several university rectors stated their intention to create a television project of their own, which began gaining more traction under Víctor Pérez's mandate.

Coinciding with its 178th anniversary, Ennio Vivaldi announced the "recovery" of its television station on 18 November 2020, through an agreement with Chilevisión to deliver it through a digital subchannel of the frequencies it operates at a national level. Vivaldi defined the project as "experimental, innovative and in accordance to the times Chile is living" and seeks to be a contribution "from the richness of the university community to dialog and encounter with the country".

Test transmissions were planned in December, with one hour and thirty minutes of programming a day. After an announcement on its social media accounts, broadcasts began in full at 8:32 pm on 30 December 2020, with a 20-minute program presented by the rector, a recording of Symphony No. 9 by Beethoven played by the National Symphonic Orchestra of Chile, and the playing of the university's anthem by the Chorus of the University of Chile.

== Programming ==
Initially, UChile TV's programming ran from 8:30pm to 10pm every evening. After signing off, and for the rest of the day, it temporarily broadcast TV Educa Chile.

From 13 January 2021, the station extended its weekday schedule to two hours, this time from 10pm to 12am. This arrangement lasted until 1 June 2021, when the test phase ended and started broadcasting a full schedule, from 7am to 12am.

Between 2021 and 2022, it broadcast the Constitutional Convention.

New programming began in 2022, making it more dynamic and diverse to reach out to more viewers, including programs such as political discussion program "Descabelladas" with Mirna Schindler, Alejandra Matus and Yasna Lewin, as well as "Con Ojo Clínico", "Caleidoscopio", "Sapiens", "Ciudad Sonora", "La vida de lxs otrxs" and "Tangram", the last one presented by Paula Molina.

In 2023, the channel aired, alongside Chilevisión, the 2023 Pan American Games held in Santiago.

== Presenters ==
- Alejandra Matus (2022-present)
- Yasna Lewin (2022-present)
- Mirna Schindler (2022-present)
- Paula Molina (2022-present)

== Logos ==
30 December 2020-28 November 2022

28 November 2022-present
