= Chilevisión =

Chilean television channel

- Country: Chile
- Broadcast area: Chile
- Headquarters: Santiago, Chile

Programming
- Language: Spanish
- Picture format: 1080i HDTV (downscaled to 480i for the SDTV feed)

Ownership
- Owner: Vytal Group
- Sister channels: Canal CHV Noticias; CHV de Culto; UChile TV

History
- Launched: 4 November 1960; 66 years ago
- Former names: Canal 9 de Televisión de la Universidad de Chile (1960–1980); Teleonce (1980–1983); Universidad de Chile Televisión (1983–1991); Red de Televisión Universidad de Chile (1991–1993)

Links
- Website: chilevision.cl

Availability

Terrestrial
- Digital VHF: Listings may vary

Chilevisión (often abbreviated as CHV) is a Chilean free-to-air television channel based in Santiago and owned by Vytal Group since 2026. Founded by the University of Chile on 4 November 1960, it is the third oldest television network or channel in operation in Chile; it was formerly owned by Time Warner (via Turner Broadcasting System) from 2010 to 2021 and Paramount Global (and later Paramount Skydance) from 2021 to 2026. In addition to Chilevisión, Vytal Group owns other TV channels, including Canal CHV Noticias, CHV de Culto, and UChileTV.

== History ==
=== Origins ===
When the Institute for Electrical Research and Testing of the Faculty of Physical and Mathematical Sciences of the University of Chile informed the rector Juan Gómez Millas, in 1959, that the experiments were already sufficiently advanced to attempt the permanent operation of a canal, this instructs the Secretary-General, Álvaro Bunster, to establish the corresponding contact with the engineers and to provide the necessary elements for its start-up. Thus, from the very beginning, Channel 9 is assumed as an institutional project of the rectory.

Within the University Council, diverse positions were expressed. The deans of the more traditional faculties viewed the initiative with reluctance. They rejected the idea that "the university continues to embark on projects that, in a way, mean becoming a Corfo-Cultural", according to Álvaro Bunster. But some shared cultural extension principles and discovered a powerful tool for it in the new environment. Among these stood out the Dean of the Faculty of Philosophy and Education, Eugenio González, who started a real battle for university television. In its approach, university television is synonymous with cultural television. This position prevailed, and Bunster - the rector's trusted official - was in charge of shaping it.

Thus, in May 1960, the Audiovisual Department was created, reporting directly to the General Secretary. Historian Leopoldo Castedo traveled from Berkeley, United States to assume the first direction of the debuting Audiovisual Department that, apart from the television section, includes the former departments of Experimental Cinema, Cinematheque, and Photography. As Director of the channel, Raúl Aicardi, a journalist with extensive experience in the radio field and, at that time, working in the Office of Film and Radio of the US Embassy, is in charge of the Chair of Audiovisual Journalism. from the School of Journalism. The Bunster-Castedo-Aicardi formula, as the first managers of the channel, expresses the search to guarantee the central political and institutional control of the channel, the cultural management of the station, and technical efficiency in its operation.

Both the selection of people —all administrative or academic from the university—and the generation of a special instance closely linked to the rectory for the start-up show the explicit institutional will to run the channel as a properly university project.

This first stage of Channel 9 coincides with the end of the second term of the rector Juan Gómez Millas, who in cultural matters continues and deepens the principles of the extension of his predecessor Juvenal Hernández. For the rector of modernization, television is justified as a means to "cooperate with public education, a factor favorable to the scientific and technological development of the country, understanding by scientific not only the natural sciences but the set of human disciplines." So much so, that the first project presented by Leopoldo Castedo to define the channel, proposes a “serious study of the insufficiencies of the national educational system so that TV can make up for this deficiency and reach all those people and sectors - especially peasants with its action. and inhabitants of the rural sector— who, for different reasons, have been excluded from education ”.

For his part, Raúl Aicardi defines university TV from a perspective that contributes certain elements more typical of the communicational field, but within the margins that the university authority has dealt with.

=== Later years ===
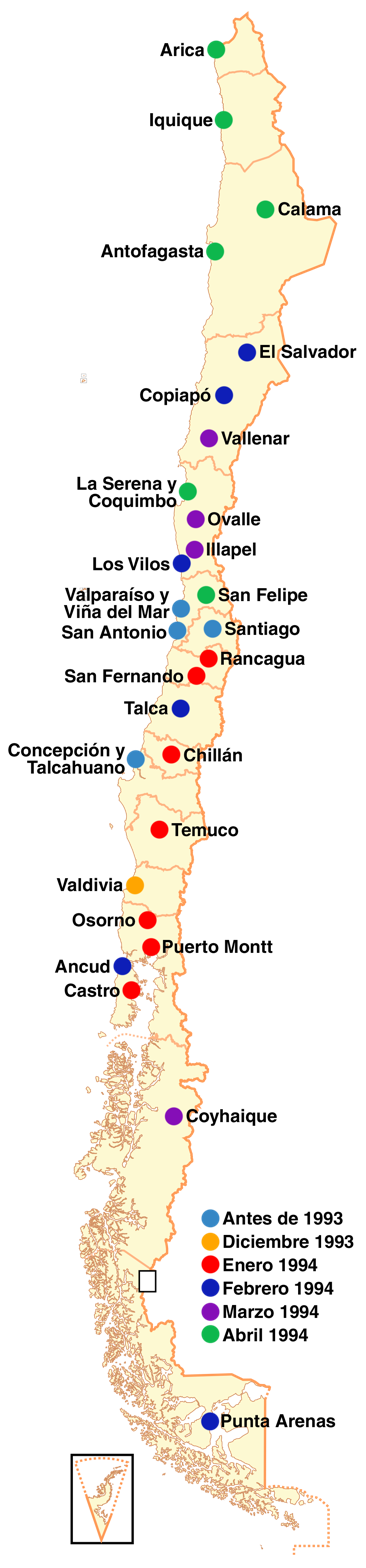
Chilevisión expansion between 1993 and 1994.

The University of Chile sold a significant percentage of its TV channel to Grupo Cisneros in 1993, changing its name to Chilevisión. It was later sold to Claxson Interactive Group in 2000 and then to late Chilean investor and president Sebastián Piñera in 2006.

On 28 August 2010, it was announced that Turner Broadcasting System Latin America had reached an agreement to purchase it. The sale was completed on 6 October 2010. This sale did not include the terrestrial television frequency, which is still owned by Universidad de Chile and is used under a paid usufruct scheme, similar to a lease. This contract expired in 2018 and only affected the analog frequencies used by the station.

On 5 April 2021, it was announced that ViacomCBS (now Paramount Skydance) had reached an agreement to acquire Chilevisión from WarnerMedia Latin America. The sale was granted approval on 5 July 2021, and completed on 1 October 2021. When Chilevisión acquired by ViacomCBS, Chilevisión is a sister to CBS in the United States, Telefe in Argentina, Channel 5 in the UK, Network 10 in Australia.

In November 2025, it was announced that Paramount Skydance will sell Chilevisión to Vytal Group, subject to pending regulatory approval. The transaction was completed on January 13, 2026.

== Programming ==
The channel mainly airs talk shows, newscasts and talent shows. It ranks second in TV viewership in the country behind Mega.

Currently its most popular programs of the channel are Contigo en la mañana, Chilevisión Noticias and the local versions of The Voice, La divina comida and Podemos hablar.

== Availability overseas ==
Chilevisión International was the international feed of Chilevisión that broadcasts its programming to audiences in Australia/Oceania. The channel launched in October 2007 in Australia and the following year in New Zealand on UBI World TV. The TVN-owned TV Chile subscription channel also broadcasts limited Chilevisión programming throughout the Americas for the Chilean diaspora.

== Controversies ==
=== Broadcasting of Teletón ===
Since its start in 1978, Chilevisión has broadcast Teletón, but scandals have happened of profits from the campaign going to some of the channels, including Chilevisión. Other scandals include program changes during the event, strikes from employees, and fights for the right to keep broadcasting from the government.

=== Controversy over decontextualized interview ===
In 2012, Chilevisión was at the center of a major controversy regarding journalistic ethics. On January 16, 2012, an interview was broadcast in which the interviewee, Inés Pérez, was portrayed as deeply classist. The interview provoked strong reactions, even leading to the creation of social media groups against Pérez. Two days later, the full interview was released, and the backlash turned against the television network. In the interview, Pérez expressed concern for those allegedly discriminated against and put everything into context. In response, the television network defended the interview's authenticity and fired the official who leaked the full video. causando reacciones aún más adversas entre los televidentes.

In 2012, Chilevisión endured controversy over journalistic ethics. On 16 January 2012, an interview aired that the interviewee, Inés Perez, was a deep class. The interview produced strong reactions, even leading social networking groups against the affected woman. The reactions returned against the broadcaster (two days after the full interview) because Pérez discriminated against assumptions and put everything in context. In response, he defended the accuracy and dismissed the officer who leaked the full video, causing even more adverse reactions among viewers.

=== Controversy over mockery of Boras and website hacking ===
On August 6, 2012, amidst a strong controversy over racist comments and mockery directed at Bora people In the middle of filming the reality show Amazonas, the channel's website was hacked by a faction of Peruvian hackers from LulzSec..

=== 2019 advertisement pulling controversy ===
In 2019, businessman Juan Sutil and food company Agrosuper decided to pull their ads. This action included some of Agrosuper's brand Super Pollo, from CNN Chile and Chilevision, purportedly because of a CNN Chile show named "Agenda Agricola", which has shown videos of anti-government protests.

== Logos ==
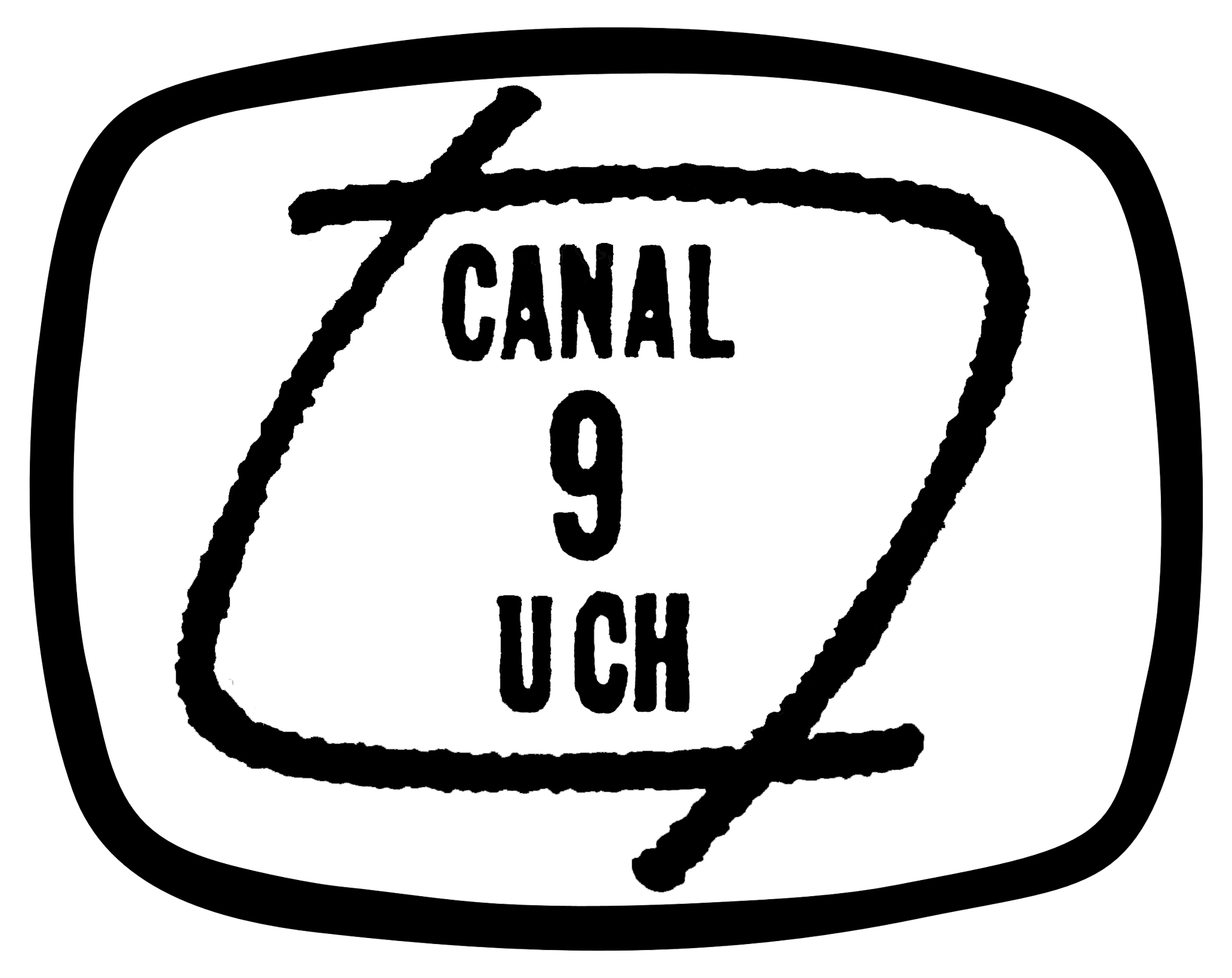
1960–1964

1964–1970

1970–1972

1972–1975

1975–1978

1978–1979

1979–1991

1991–1992

1992–1993

1993–1998

2006–2014

2015–2018

2018–present

== See also ==
- List of Chilean television channels
