= Chilevisión Noticias =

Chilean news programme

- Current programme titles
- Genre: News
- Country of origin: Chile
- Original language: Spanish

Production
- Producer: Maria Paz Epelman
- Running time: 85 minutes

Original release
- Network: Chilevisión
- Release: March 25, 1996 – present

Related
- Mundovisión

Chilevisión Noticias (Chilevision News) is the branding of news programmes on the Chilean television network Chilevisión, since March 25, 1996. Its flagship program is the daily evening newscast CHV Noticias Central presented by Daniel Matamala and Macarena Pizarro, broadcast every day at 9:00pm in continental territory and 7:00pm in Easter Island, it features a review of eighty-five minutes of only national and sports news. Other programmes include a morning magazine, an Afternoon edition and finally a midnight news-talk show.

== Presenters ==
=== Contigo CHV Noticias AM ===
- Montserrat Álvarez.
- Roberto Cox.

=== CHV Noticias Tarde ===
- Karina Álvarez.
- Matilde Burgos.
- Viviana Encina

=== CHV Noticias Central ===
- Mónica Rincon.
- Macarena Pizarro.
- Daniel Matamala.
- Humberto Sichel
