= Teletrece =

- Teletrece Logo, since 17 July 2025.
- Also known as: T13; Tele13
- Genre: News programme
- Directed by: Claudio Villavicencio
- Presented by: Ramón Ulloa; Soledad Onetto
- Starring: Juan Cristóbal Guarello; Aldo Schiappacasse; Ignacio Valenzuela; Eugenio Figueroa; Carolina Infante
- Country of origin: Chile
- Original language: Spanish

Production
- Producer: Sebastián Vargas
- Production locations: Catholic University of Chile headquarters (1970–1983); Canal 13 Television Centre (1983–present)
- Editors: Daniel Labarca; Alfredo Ramirez
- Camera setup: Multi-camera
- Running time: 90 minutes

Original release
- Network: Canal 13
- Release: 1 March 1970 – present

Related
- Martini al instante

Teletrece, also known as T13 or Tele 13, is the flagship daily evening television news programme of the Chilean television channel Canal 13. It is presented by journalists Ramón Ulloa and Soledad Onetto. First aired on 1 March 1970, it is currently the longest-running television programme and the second most watched national newscast in Chile.

It is broadcast Monday to Sunday at 9:00pm in continental territory and 7:00pm in Easter Island. It features ninety minutes of national, international and sports news, followed by a national weather forecast with Carolina Infante. The 9pm primetime edition is broadcast primarily live from the Channel 13 Television Centre in Providencia, Santiago Metropolitan Region to viewers all over Chile.

== History ==
Teletrece was launched on 1 March 1970, replacing the former newscast El repórter Esso (1964–1968) and Martini al instante (1968–1970). It is the current flagship programme from the news division of the network, which started in 1963. Pepe Abad, Pepe Guixé and Freddy Hube were the program's first newsreaders. Since its initial duration of 30 minutes each night, Teletrece began extending in 1973, with its broadcast hour now being an hour and a half, with three daily editions of 30 minutes, because more information was being broadcast. These editions would form the basis of the Teletrece brand of newscasts, in addition to 5-minute news updates during the day and the Sunday afternoon newscast Perfil Noticioso de la Semana, presented by Javier Miranda. By 1971, its initial anti-Salvador Allende stance, a point of criticism in its early days, dissipated.

After the coup that overthrew Salvador Allende, Teletrece had a fundamental role in broadcasting the coup, becoming then the second newscast to be broadcast nationwide, as TVN was then shut down. In 1974, Abad was replaced as principal presenter by Guillermo Parada, who stayed on for only a year.

In 1975, César Antonio Santis arrived at a relaunched Nuevo Teletrece as the new presenter on his return to Canal 13. In 1977, the newscast adopted chroma key for its production.

On 1 January 1978, Teletrece made the first national color news broadcast, after the Pinochet government decree removed color television from being a prohibited good, a status it had since January 1972 under a strengthening of protectionist policies during the period 1970 to 1973. In 1977, Javier Miranda joined Teletrece as an alternate presenter for weekends. By then the newscast became the nation's most watched, beating off the competition. In 1983, Santis ended the May 14 newscast with a tribute to the Lira Street news studios of Channel 13, then located in the downtown Santiago campus of the Catholic University which it shared for many years, as the editions to be aired from the following day onwards would be produced and aired live from the brand new news studios at the Channel 13 Television Centre. In 1985, it was the first newscast reporting on the consequences of 1985 earthquake on the south coasts of Valparaíso Region.

In 1988, Santis left to join the TVN news department, leaving Miranda as the presenter for weekdays. Augusto Gatica assumed the presenter role for weekends until 1990 when he was replaced by Jorge Díaz. Since Miranda was also the presenter of the Tuesday night variety programme Martes 13 until he left the series following the 1992 season, Gatica became relief presenter for the Tuesday edition until 1989 when Diaz took over. Teletrece later adopted stereo sound at that time. In 1990, Teletrece became a single-presenter program, which moved to the Channel 13 Press Center studios. In 1998, the morning edition was launched in time for the World Cup that year, which in 1999 restarted broadcasts under the brand Teletrece AM.

On 26 September 1999, Rodrigo Jordan, Canal 13 director-in-chief, relaunched the telecast with new presenters Jorge Diaz and Carolina Jimenez for weekdays, and Silvia Carrasco and Rodolfo Paredes for weekends, both with a dual presenter format. Regular members of the panel then included Ramon Ulloa, Antonio Quinteros, and Matilde Burgos. All Teletrece editions, studios and graphics were refreshed to be more cohesive with the new branding. When Diaz left the program in 2002, Jimenez made history becoming thus the first woman solo presenter for the weekday edition.

From 30 April 2002 to 20 February 2009, Teletrece was hosted by Mauricio Hofmann along with Constanza Santa Maria from 2005 to 2007. On 9 November 2005, Teletrece adopted closed captions (CC). In mid-2007, Teletrece began to be produced in high definition. In 2009, Canal 13 began to centralize the newscast's reporter pool and content, closing Teletrece's news centres in Antofagasta and Temuco. The channel, later on 29 August 2014, briefly closed the news centre in Concepción, leaving only the news centre of Valparaiso, but the decision was rescinded. Both regional editions ended broadcasts in 2018 and 2019, respectively, and today these reporters form the regional bureaux that provide reports that are transmitted nationally from its studios at the Santiago-based Channel 13 Television Centre. In 2020, live opt-outs from the regions debuted during the national broadcast to serve regional viewers, adopting the format previously used by the Nine News regional editions in stations under Southern Cross Nine (now 10 Regional) in Australia. These later expanded to the afternoon Teletrece Tarde as an opt-out for viewers living in these areas.

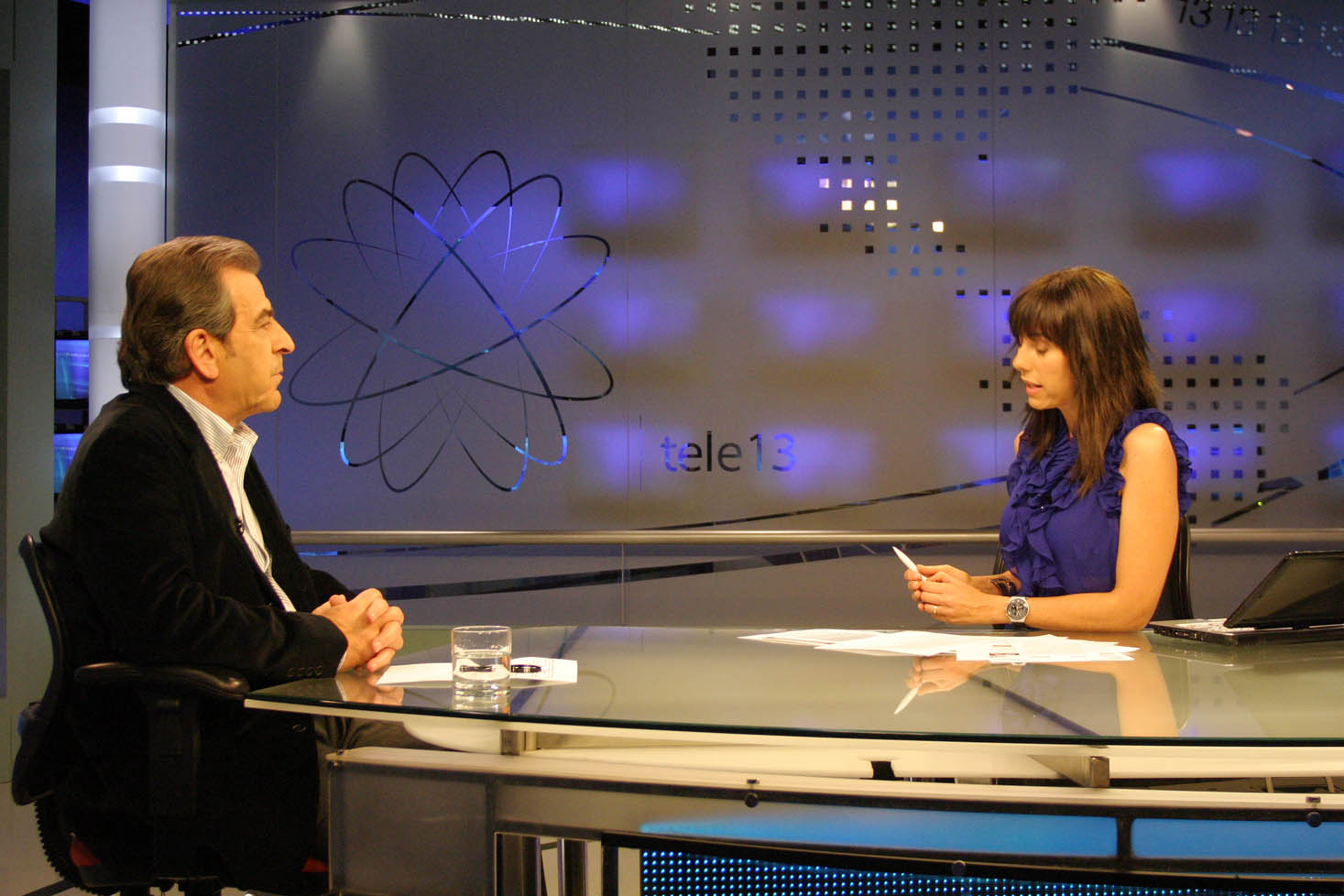
Macarena Puigrredón meets with presidential candidate Eduardo Frei in 2009.

On 2 May 2012, the programme, along with the rest of Teletrece editions, underwent a graphical refresh and new presenters Montserrat Alvarez and Ramon Ulloa with a new studio, but two years later on 11 August 2014, Monserrat Alvarez left T13, and her place was taken by Constanza Santa Maria. Since 22 October 2014, the bulletin has been simulcast on the 13c channel. On 16 March 2016, Teletrece debuted a new graphics package and minor updates to the set.

=== Afternoon and late-night editions ===
These editions, Teletrece Tarde and Teletrece Noche, began in 1970, the same year as Teletrece, whose 9 pm edition is considered the main primetime edition (edicion central), together with the 11:30 pm Telecierre, these ended in 1973–1974 (with the departure of some of its presenters) and would return in 1981, remaining on air until the present. At first, the afternoon edition, then branded Teletarde, was presented by Mirella Latorre (later replaced by Gina Zuanic) and Julio Pérez, the then early evening Telenoche with Miranda, Rose Marie Graepp (later replaced by Virginia Escobedo) and Pepe Guixé, and Telecierre by Freddy Hube, who was co-presenter with Guixé and Abad in the main newscast. Telenoche was replaced in 1974 with the newscast 24 Horas (not to be confused with the same-named newscast on TVN), which was short-lived, it was presented by Julio López Blanco, who left for TVN in 1975. Both Teletarde and Telenoche returned to broadcasts in 1981 with 20-minute broadcasts and their new presenters Cecilia Serrano and Jorge Diaz, with the latter now taking over Telecierre's old timeslot. Serrano left the afternoon newscast for TVN in 1990, with the then Teletrece weather presenter Jeannette Frazier replacing her while Diaz was, upon his promotion as presenter for weekends, replaced by Loreto Delpín. Both were broadcasting from the Channel 13 Newsroom, first located at the Central Campus and then at the Television Centre, and by 1990 moved on to share a singular studio with the main edition and with half-hour durations each.

== Presenters ==
=== Current presenters ===
Weekdays

- Ramón Ulloa (2011–)
- Mónica Pérez (2020–)

Weekends and special editions

- Iván Valenzuela (2009–2012; 2014–)
- Carolina Urrejola (2010–)
- Paulo Ramírez (2010–)
- Cristina González (2013–)
- Álvaro Paci (2013–)
- Alfonso Concha (2014–)

=== Former presenters ===
- Pepe Abad (1970–1972)
- Guillermo Parada (1972–1975)
- Julio López Blanco (1975)
- Alfonso Pérez (1975)
- Francisco Hernández (1975)
- César Antonio Santis (1975–1988)
- Javier Miranda (1976–1987; 1988–1999)
- Augusto Gatica (1988–1990; 1988–1989)
- Jorge Díaz Saenger (1990–1992; 1995–2002)
- Eduardo Riveros (1995–1999; 2001–2009)
- Carolina Jiménez (1999–2002)
- Silvia Carrasco (1999–2001)
- Rodolfo Paredes (1999–2000)
- Mauricio Hofmann (2002–2009; 2013–2014)
- Soledad Onetto (2009–2011)
- Monserrat Álvarez (2011–2014)
- Macarena Puigrredón (2009–2010)
- Marlén Eguiguren (2013–2014)
- Antonio Quinteros (2002–2017)
- Constanza Santa Maria (2005–2007; 2010–2012; 2014–2021)

=== Weather forecast ===
- Gabriela Velasco (1975–1978)
- Gina Zuanic (1977–1992)
- Carmen Jaureguiberry (1977–1990)
- Jeanette Frazier (1985–1991)
- Bárbara Ackermann (1993–2002)
- Loreto Delpín (1991–2010)
- Vanesa Borghi (2009–2010)
- Carolina Infante (1997–1998, 2001–)
- Michelle Adam (2001–2004, 2013–)

=== Segment presenters ===
During the 1980s the newscast's presenter either on weekends or weekdays was joined by the following segment reporters:

- Sports: Julio Martínez, Raúl Prado Cavada and Alberto Fouillioux
- International news: José María Navasal, Alejandro Magnet, Juan Ramón Silva, Bernardo de la Maza, Karin Ebensperger, Julio Prado Donoso, Sonia Jankelevich
- Religious news and commentary: Raúl Hasbún and Luis Eugenio Silva
- Business and finance: Manuel Salgado Inzunza
- Entertainment and special interests: Marina de Navasal, María Inés Sáez

== Logos ==
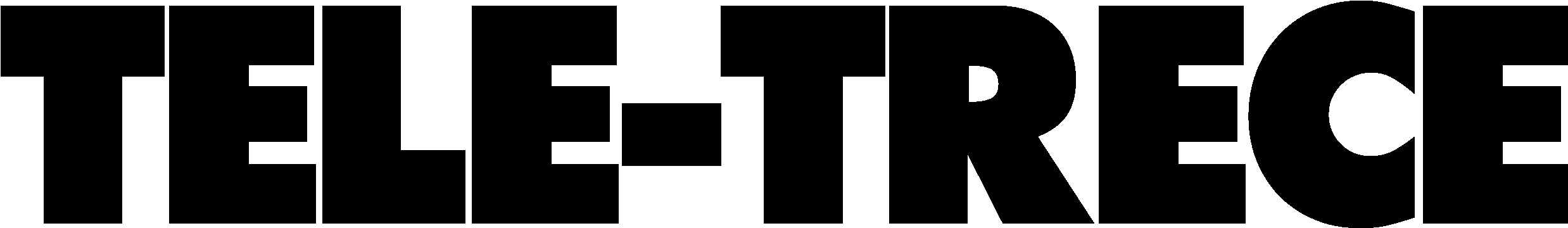
Used from 1972 to 1975.

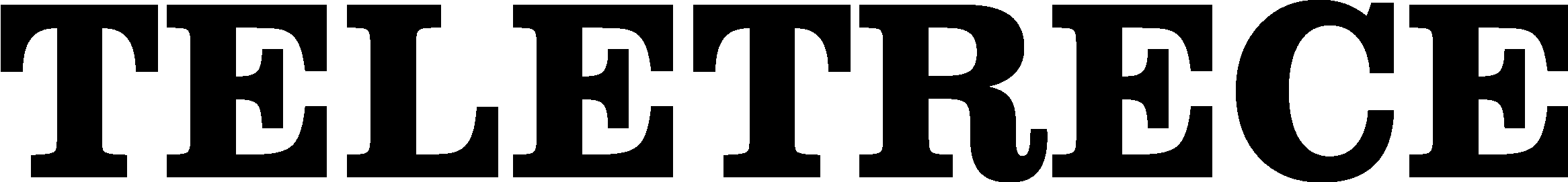
Used from 1975 to 1977.

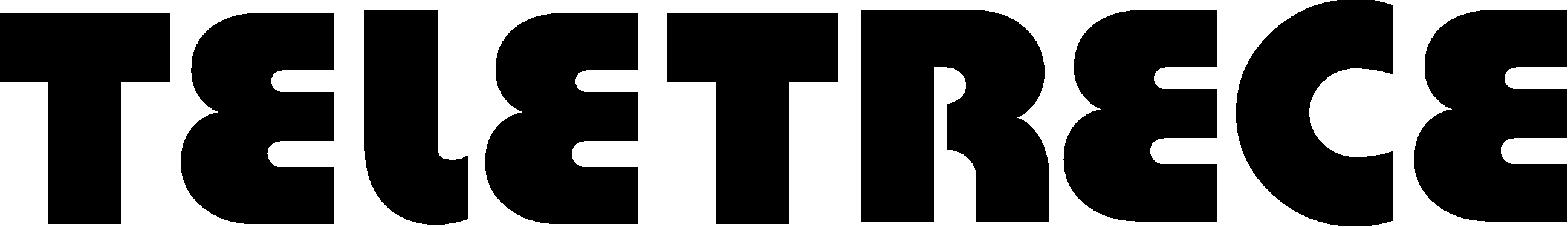
Used from 1979 to 1992.

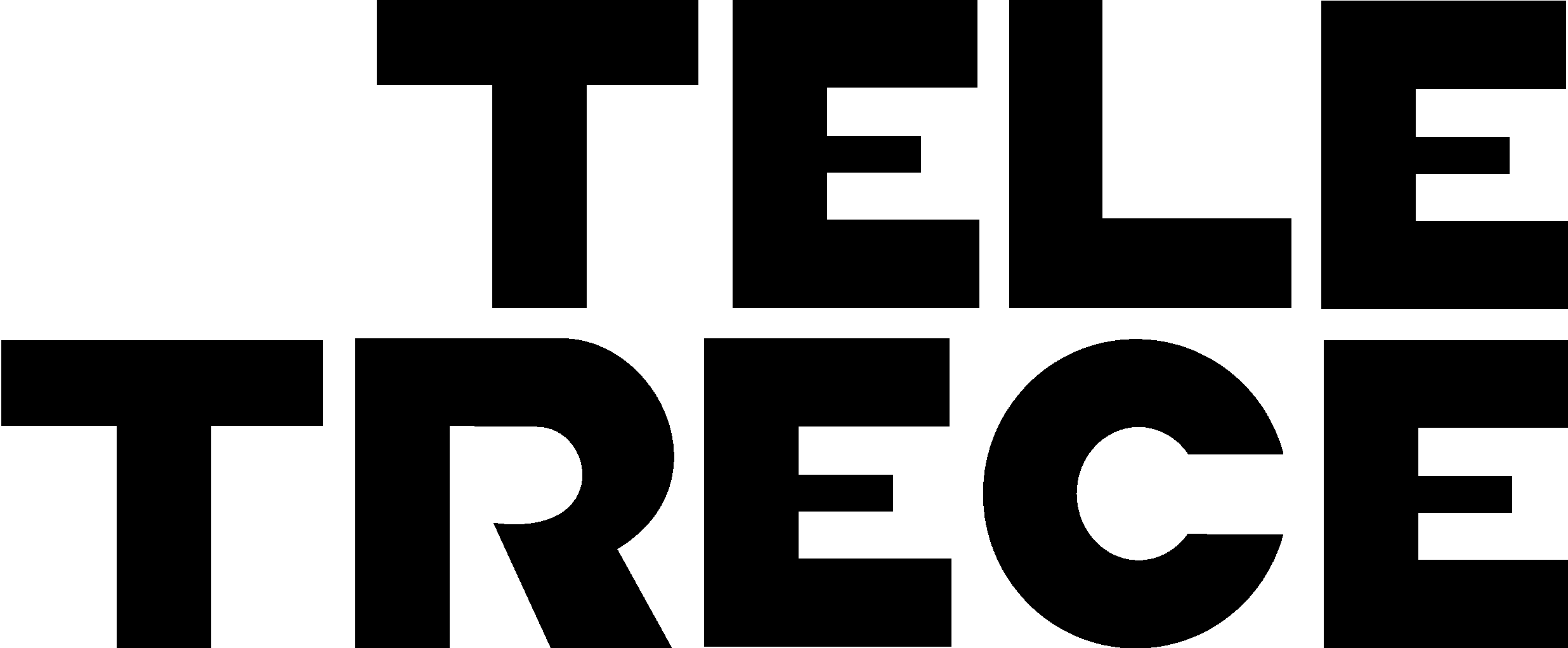
Used from 1992 to 1994.

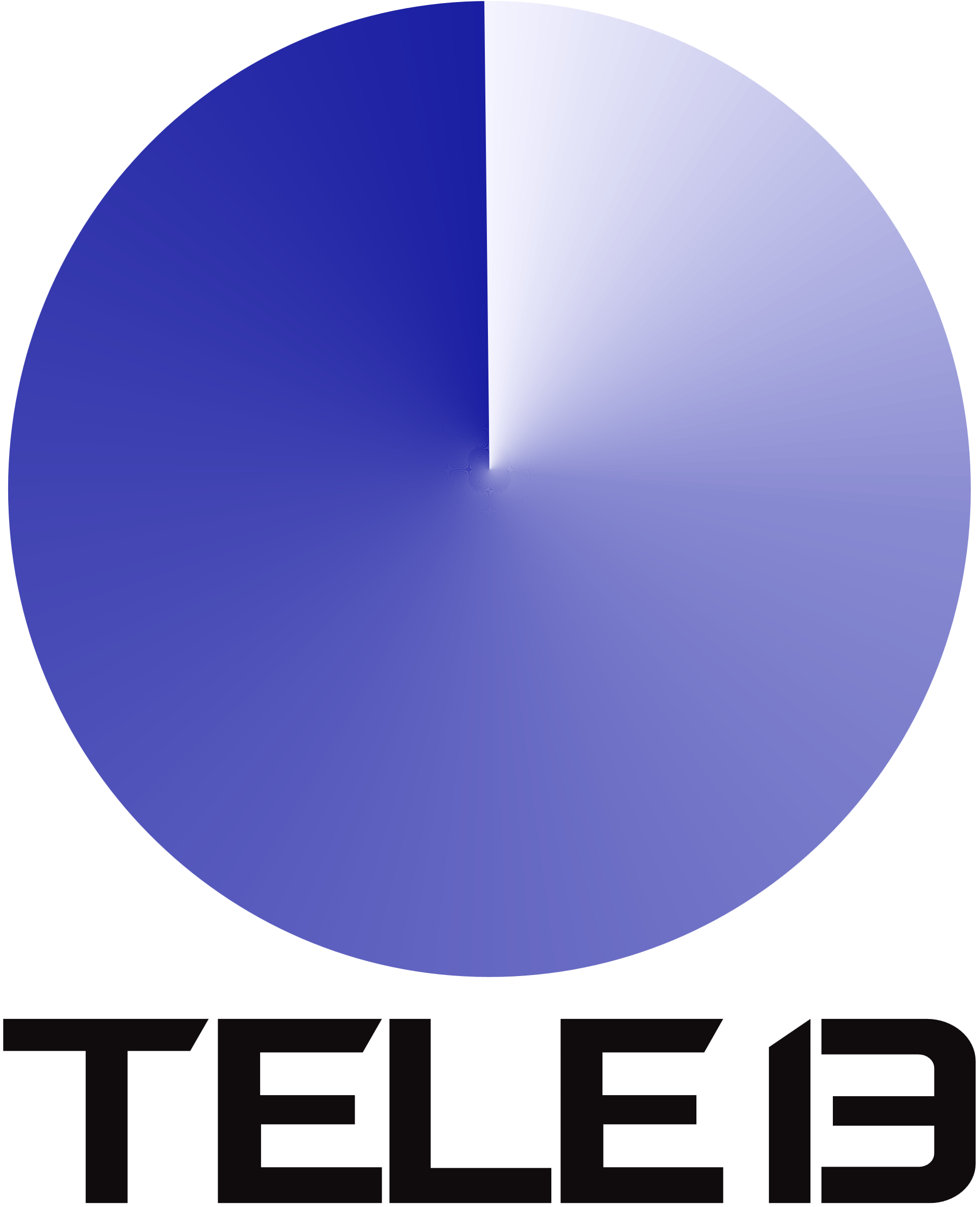
Used from 1999 to 15 August 2000.

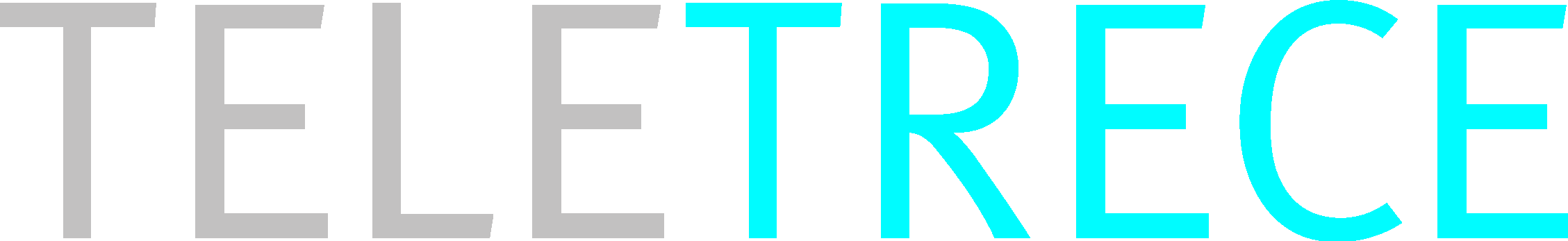
Used from 16 August 2000 to 14 July 2002.

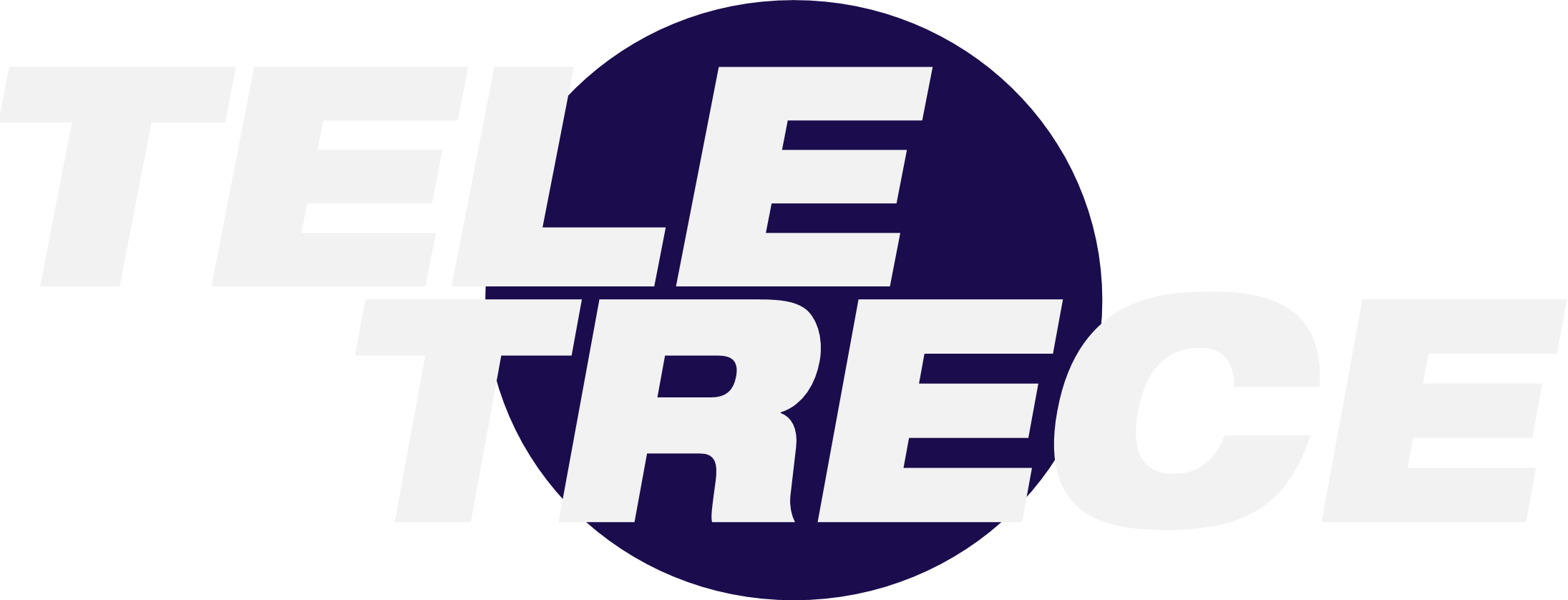
Used from 14 March 2005 to 3 March 2008.

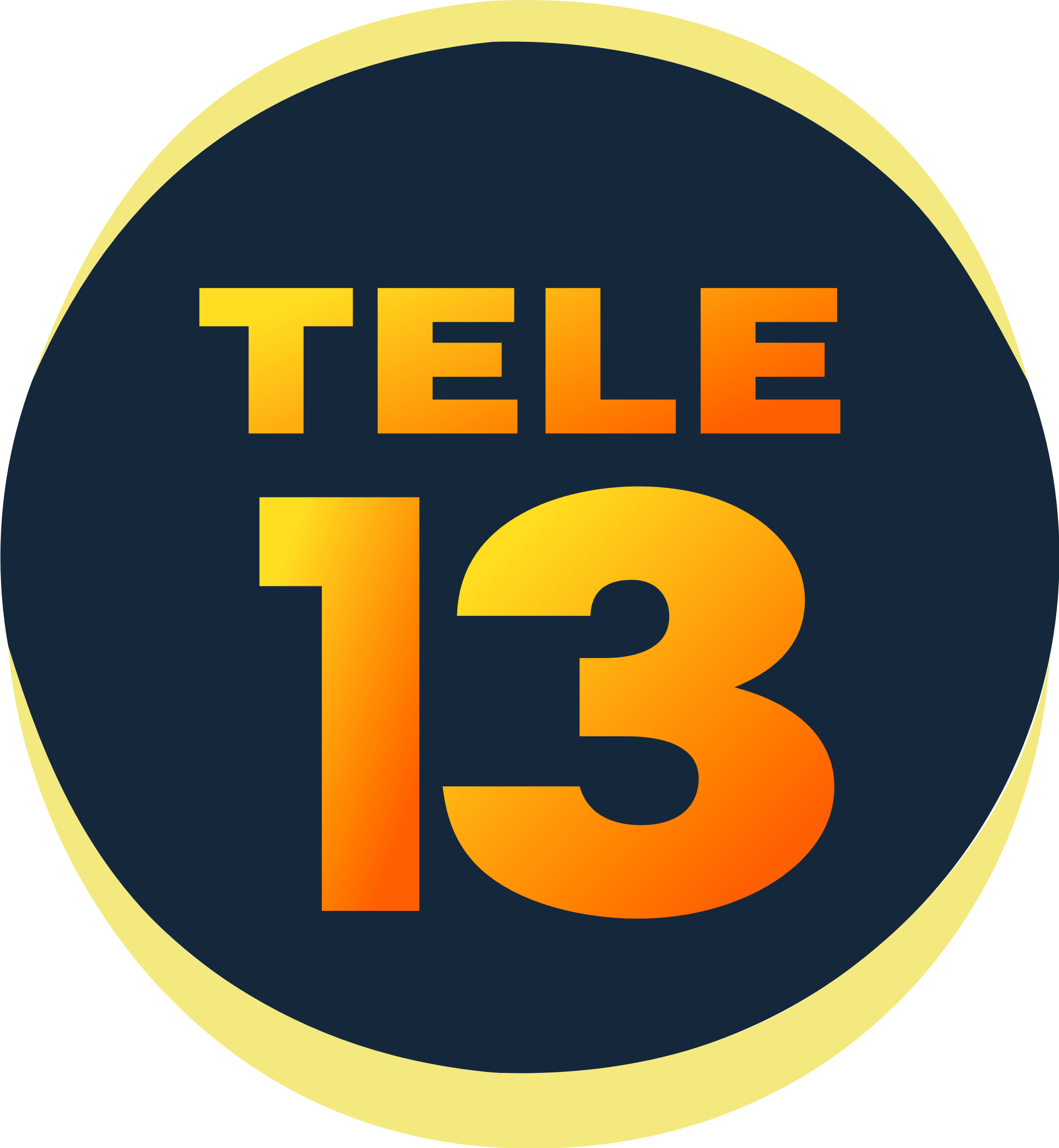
Used from 4 March 2008 to 2009.

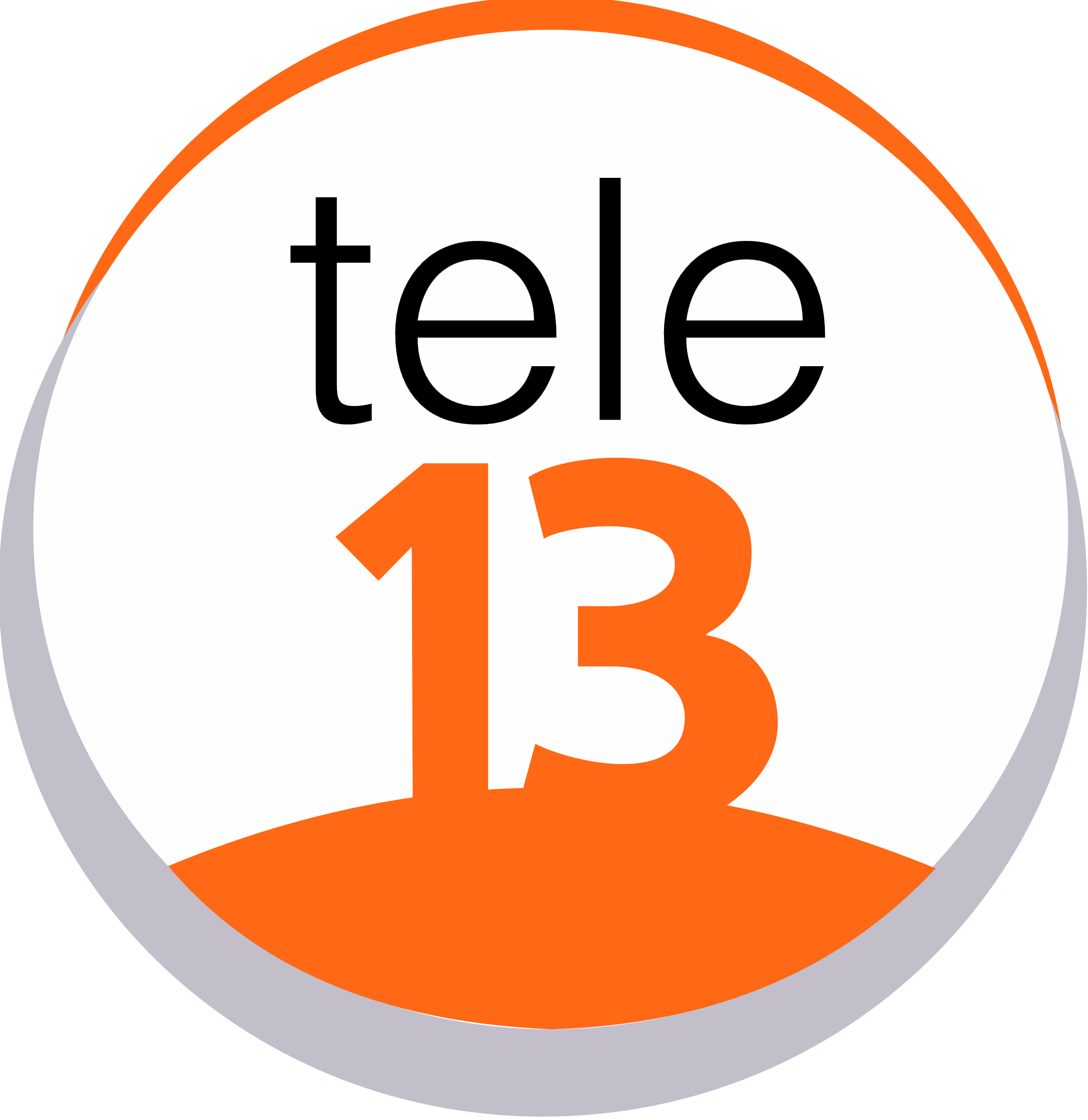
Used from 2010 to 1 May 2012.

Used from 2 May 2012 to 16 March 2016.

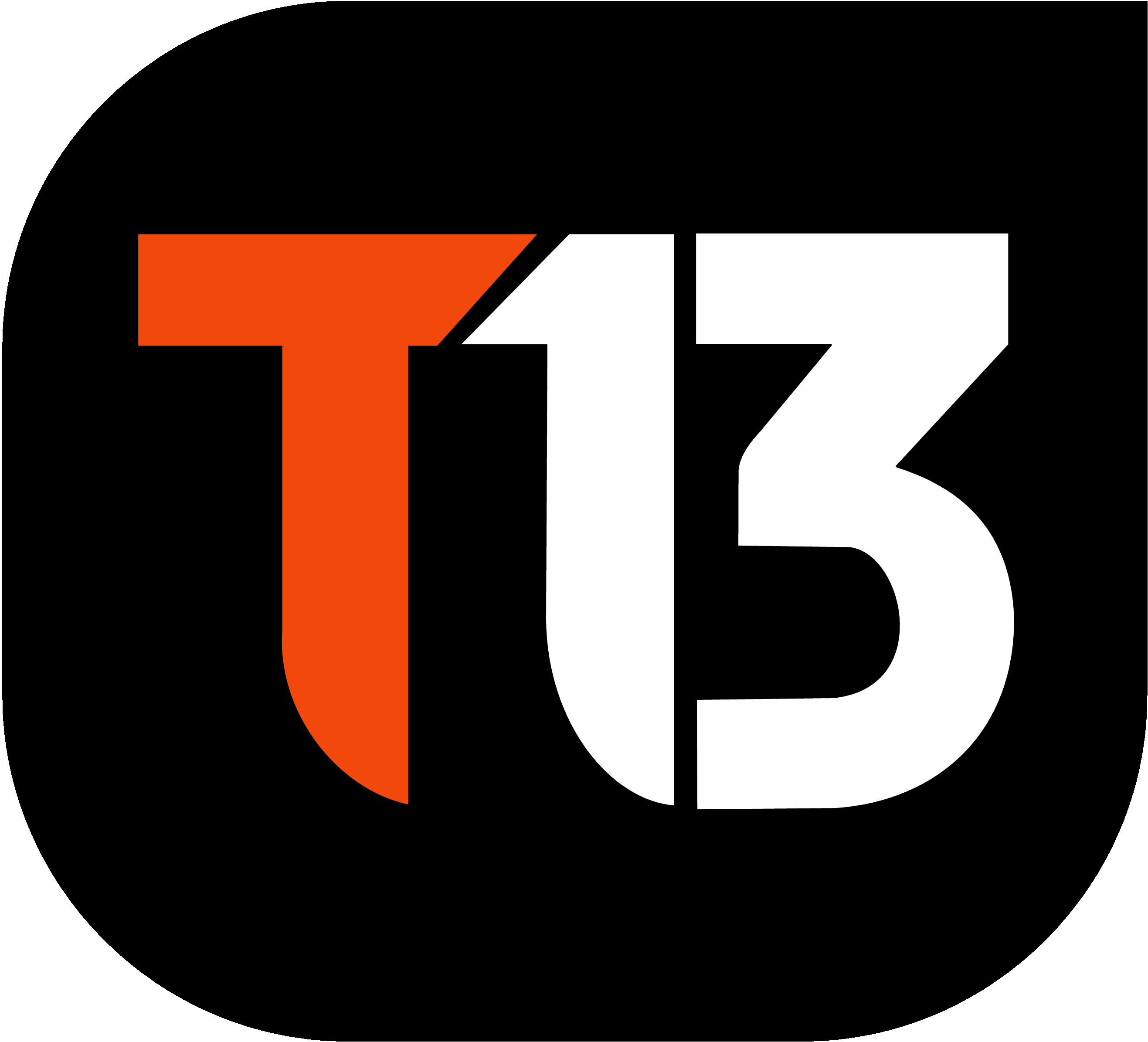
Used from 16 March 2016 to 2 March 2019.

Used from 3 May 2022 - 17 July 2025

Current logo, used since 17 July 2025

== See also ==
- 24 Horas
- Chilevisión Noticias
- Meganoticias
